= List of Olympic medalists in field hockey =

This is the complete list of Olympic medalists in field hockey.

== Men ==
Games	Gold	Silver	Bronze
1908 London	Great Britain; England; Louis Baillon; Harry Freeman; Eric Green; Gerald Logan; Alan Noble; Edgar Page; Reggie Pridmore; Percy Rees; John Yate Robinson; Stanley Shoveller; Harvey Wood	Great Britain; Ireland; Edward Allman-Smith; Henry Brown; Walter Campbell; William Graham; Richard Gregg; Edward Holmes; Robert Kennedy; Henry Murphy; Jack Peterson; Walter Peterson; Charles Power; Frank Robinson	Great Britain; Scotland; Alexander Burt; John Burt; Alastair Denniston; Charles Foulkes; Hew Fraser; James Harper-Orr; Ivan Laing; Hugh Neilson; Gordon Orchardson; Norman Stevenson; Hugh Walker
1908 London	Great Britain; England; Louis Baillon; Harry Freeman; Eric Green; Gerald Logan; Alan Noble; Edgar Page; Reggie Pridmore; Percy Rees; John Yate Robinson; Stanley Shoveller; Harvey Wood	Great Britain; Ireland; Edward Allman-Smith; Henry Brown; Walter Campbell; William Graham; Richard Gregg; Edward Holmes; Robert Kennedy; Henry Murphy; Jack Peterson; Walter Peterson; Charles Power; Frank Robinson	Great Britain; Wales; Frank Connah; Llewellyn Evans; Arthur Law; Richard Lyne; Wilfred Pallott; Frederick Phillips; Edward Richards; Charles Shephard; Bertrand Turnbull; Philip Turnbull; James Williams
1912 Stockholm	not included in the Olympic programme		
1920 Antwerp	Great Britain; Charles Atkin; John Bennett; Colin Campbell; Harold Cassels; Harold Cooke; Eric Crockford; Reginald Crummack; Harry Haslam; Arthur Leighton; Charles Marcon; John McBryan; George McGrath; Stanley Shoveller; William Smith; Cyril Wilkinson	Denmark; Hans Bjerrum; Ejvind Blach; Niels Blach; Steen Due; Thorvald Eigenbrod; Frands Faber; Hans Jørgen Hansen; Hans Herlak; Henning Holst; Erik Husted; Paul Metz; Andreas Rasmussen	Belgium; André Becquet; Pierre Chibert; Raoul Daufresne de la Chevalerie; Fernand de Montigny; Charles Delelienne; Louis Diercxsens; Robert Gevers; Adolphe Goemaere; Charles Gniette; Raymond Keppens; René Strauwen; Pierre Valcke; Maurice van den Bemden; Jean van Nerom
1924 Paris	not included in the Olympic program		
1928 Amsterdam	India; Richard Allen; Dhyan Chand; Maurice Gateley; William Goodsir-Cullen; Leslie Hammond; Feroze Khan; George Marthins; Rex Norris; Broome Pinniger; Michael Rocque; Frederic Seaman; Ali Shaukat; Jaipal Singh; Sayed Yusuf Kher Singh Gill	Netherlands; Jan Ankerman; Jan Brand; Rein de Waal; Emile Duson; Gerrit Jannink; Adriaan Katte; August Kop; Ab Tresling; Paul van de Rovaart; Robert van der Veen; Haas Visser 't Hooft C. J. J. Hardebeck; T. F. Hubrecht; G. Leembruggen; H. J. L. Mangelaar Meertens; Otto Muller von Czernicki; W. J. van Citters; C. J. van der Hagen; Tonny van Lierop; J. J. van Tienhoven van den Bogaard; J. M. van Voorst van Beest; N. Wenholt	Germany; Bruno Boche; Georg Brunner; Heinz Förstendorf; Erwin Franzkowiak; Werner Freyberg; Theodor Haag; Hans Haußmann; Kurt Haverbeck; Aribert Heymann; Herbert Hobein; Fritz Horn; Karl-Heinz Irmer; Herbert Kemmer; Herbert Müller; Werner Proft; Gerd Strantzen; Rolf Wollner; Heinz Wöltje; Erich Zander Fritz Lincke; Heinz Schäfer; Kurt Weiß
1932 Los Angeles	India; Richard Allen; Muhammad Aslam; Lal Bokhari; Frank Brewin; Richard Carr; Dhyan Chand; Leslie Hammond; Arthur Hind; Sayed Jaffar; Masud Minhas; Broome Pinniger; Gurmit Singh Kullar; Roop Singh; William Sullivan; Carlyle Tapsell	Japan; Shunkichi Hamada; Junzo Inohara; Sadayoshi Kobayashi; Haruhiko Kon; Kenichi Konishi; Hiroshi Nagata; Eiichi Nakamura; Yoshio Sakai; Katsumi Shibata; Akio Sohda; Toshio Usami	United States; William Boddington; Harold Brewster; Roy Coffin; Amos Deacon; Horace Disston; Samuel Ewing; James Gentle; Henry Greer; Lawrence Knapp; David McMullin; Leonard O'Brien; Charles Sheaffer; Frederick Wolters
1936 Berlin	India; Richard Allen; Dhyan Chand; Ali Dara; Lionel Emmett; Peter Fernandes; Joseph Galibardy; Earnest Goodsir-Cullen; Mohammed Hussain; Sayed Jaffar; Ahmed Khan; Ahsan Khan; Mirza Masood; Cyril Michie; Baboo Nimal; Joseph Phillips; Shabban Shahab-ud-Din; G. S. Garewal; Roop Singh; Carlyle Tapsell	Germany; Hermann auf der Heide; Ludwig Beisiegel; Erich Cuntz; Karl Dröse; Alfred Gerdes; Werner Hamel; Harald Huffmann; Erwin Keller; Herbert Kemmer; Werner Kubitzki; Paul Mehlitz; Karl Menke; Fritz Messner; Detlef Okrent; Heinrich Peter; Heinz Raack; Carl Ruck; Hans Scherbart; Heinz Schmalix; Tito Warnholtz; Kurt Weiß; Erich Zander	Netherlands; Henk de Looper; Jan de Looper; Aat de Roos; Rein de Waal; Piet Gunning; Inge Heybroek; Hans Schnitger; René Sparenberg; Ernst van den Berg; Ru van der Haar; Tonny van Lierop; Max Westerkamp
1948 London	India; Leslie Claudius; Keshav Dutt; Walter D'Souza; Lawrie Fernandes; Ranganathan Francis; Gerry Glackan; Akhtar Hussain; Patrick Jansen; Amir Kumar; Kishan Lal; Leo Pinto; Jaswant Singh Rajput; Latif-ur-Rehman; Reginald Rodrigues; Balbir Singh Sr. Randhir Singh Gentle; Grahanandan Singh; K. D. Singh; Trilochan Singh; Maxie Vaz	Great Britain; Robert Adlard; Norman Borrett; David Brodie; Ronald Davis; William Griffiths; Frederick Lindsay; William Lindsay; John Peake; Frank Reynolds; George Sime; Michael Walford; William White	Netherlands; André Boerstra; Henk Bouwman; Piet Bromberg; Harry Derckx; Han Drijver; Dick Esser; Roepie Kruize; Jenne Langhout; Dick Loggere; Ton Richter; Eddy Tiel; Wim van Heel
1952 Helsinki	India; Leslie Claudius; Meldric Daluz; Keshav Dutt; Chinadorai Deshmutu; Ranganathan Francis; Raghbir Lal; Govind Perumal; Muniswamy Rajgopal; Balbir Singh Sr. Randhir Singh Gentle; Udham Singh; Dharam Singh; Grahanandan Singh; K. D. Singh	Netherlands; Jules Ancion; André Boerstra; Harry Derckx; Han Drijver; Dick Esser; Roepie Kruize; Dick Loggere; Lau Mulder; Eddy Tiel; Wim van Heel; Leonard Wery	Great Britain; Denys Carnill; John Cockett; John Conroy; Graham Dadds; Derek Day; Dennis Eagan; Robin Fletcher; Roger Midgley; Richard Norris; Neil Nugent; Anthony Nunn; Anthony John Robinson; John Paskin Taylor
1956 Melbourne	India; Leslie Claudius; Ranganathan Francis; Haripal Kaushik; Amir Kumar; Raghbir Lal; Shankar Lakshman; Govind Perumal; Amit Singh Bakshi; Raghbir Singh Bhola; Balbir Singh Sr. Hardyal Singh Garchey; Randhir Singh Gentle; Balkishan Singh Grewal; Gurdev Singh Kullar; Udham Singh Kullar; Bakshish Singh; Charles Stephen	Pakistan; Abdul Rashid; Akhtar Hussain; Munir Dar; Ghulam Rasul; Anwar Khan; Habib Ali Kiddie; Latif-ur-Rehman; Manzoor Hussain Atif; Motiullah; Naseer Bunda; Noor Alam; Khursheed Aslam; Abdul Waheed; Mushtaq Ahmad; Zakir Hussain	United Team of Germany; Günther Brennecke; Hugo Budinger; Werner Delmes; Hugo Dollheiser; Eberhard Ferstl; Alfred Lücker; Helmut Nonn; Wolfgang Nonn; Heinz Radzikowski; Werner Rosenbaum; Günther Ullerich
1960 Rome	Pakistan; Abdul Hamid; Rashid Abdul; Abdul Waheed; Bashir Ahmad; Ghulam Rasul; Anwar Khan; Khursheed Aslam; Habib Ali Kiddie; Manzoor Hussain Atif; Mushtaq Ahmad; Motiullah; Naseer Bunda; Noor Alam; Munir Dar	India; Joseph Antic; Leslie Claudius; Jaman Lal Sharma; Mohinder Lal; Shankar Lakshman; John Peter; Govind Sawant; Raghbir Singh Bhola; Udham Singh Kullar; Charanjit Singh; Jaswant Singh; Joginder Singh; Prithipal Singh; Balkishan Singh	Spain; Pedro Amat; Francisco Caballer; Juan Calzado; José Colomer; Carlos del Coso; José Dinarés; Eduardo Dualde; Joaquín Dualde; Rafael Egusquiza; Ignacio Macaya; Pedro Murúa; Pedro Roig; Luis Usoz; Narciso Ventalló
1964 Tokyo	India; Haripal Kaushik; Mohinder Lal; Shankar Lakshman; Bandu Patil; John Peter; Ali Sayed; Udham Singh Kullar; Charanjit Singh; Darshan Singh; Dharam Singh; Gurbux Singh; Harbinder Singh; Jagjit Singh; Joginder Singh; Prithipal Singh	Pakistan; Abdul Hamid; Muhammad Asad Malik; Munir Dar; Khalid Mahmood; Anwar Ahmed Khan; Nawaz Khizar; Azam Khurshid; Muhammad Manna; Manzoor Hussain Atif; Mohammed Rashid; Motiullah; Tariq Niazi; Saeed Anwar; Aziz Tariq; Zafar Hayat; Uddin Zaka	Australia; Mervyn Crossman; Paul Dearing; Raymond Evans; Brian Glencross; Robin Hodder; John McBryde; Donald McWatters; Patrick Nilan; Eric Pearce; Julian Pearce; Desmond Piper; Donald Smart; Anthony Waters; Graham Wood
1968 Mexico City	Pakistan; Abdul Rasheed; Jahangir Butt; Tanvir Dar; Gulraiz Akhtar; Khalid Mahmood; Muhammad Asad Malik; Mohammad Ashfaq; Tariq Niazi; Riaz Ahmed; Riaz ud-Din; Saeed Anwar; Tariq Aziz; Zakir Hussain	Australia; Paul Dearing; Raymond Evans; Brian Glencross; Robert Haigh; Donald Martin; James Mason; Patrick Nilan; Eric Pearce; Gordon Pearce; Julian Pearce; Desmond Piper; Fred Quine; Ronald Riley; Donald Smart; Arthur Busch	India; Rajendran Christie; Krishnamurthy Perumal; John Peter; Inam-ur Rahman; Munir Sait; Ajitpal Singh; Balbir Singh Kullar (II); Balbir Singh Kular(III); Gurbux Singh; Harbinder Singh; Harmik Singh; Inder Singh; Prithipal Singh; Jagjit Singh; Tarsem Singh
1972 Munich	West Germany; Wolfgang Baumgart; Horst Dröse; Dieter Freise; Werner Kaessmann; Carsten Keller; Detlev Kittstein; Ulrich Klaes; Peter Kraus; Michael Krause; Michael Peter; Wolfgang Rott; Fritz Schmidt; Rainer Seifert; Wolfgang Strödter; Eckart Suhl; Eduard Thelen; Peter Trump; Ulrich Vos	Pakistan; Rashid Abdul; Akhtar Rasool; Ul Akhtar; Jahangir Butt; Ur Fazal; Islahuddin Siddique; Muhammad Asad Malik; Shahnaz Sheikh; Munawwaruz Zaman; Ahmad Riaz; Saeed Anwar; Saleem Sherwani; Iftikar Syed; Mudassar Syed; Zahid Sheikh	India; B. P. Govinda; Charles Cornelius; Manuel Frederick; Michael Kindo; Ashok Kumar; M. P. Ganesh; Krishnamurty Perumal; Ajitpal Singh; Harbinder Singh; Harcharan Singh; Harmik Singh; Kulwant Singh; Mukhbain Singh; Virinder Singh
1976 Montreal	New Zealand; Paul Ackerley; Jeff Archibald; Arthur Borren; Alan Chesney; John Christensen; Greg Dayman; Tony Ineson; Barry Maister; Selwyn Maister; Trevor Manning; Alan McIntyre; Neil McLeod; Arthur Parkin; Mohan Patel; Ramesh Patel; Les Wilson	Australia; David Bell; Greg Browning; Ric Charlesworth; Ian Cooke; Barry Dancer; Douglas Golder; Robert Haigh; Wayne Hammond; Jim Irvine; Malcolm Poole; Robert Proctor; Graeme Reid; Ronald Riley; Trevor Smith; Terry Walsh	Pakistan; Rashid Abdul; Akhtar Rasool; Mahmood Arshad; Arshad Chaudhry; Khan Haneef; Islahuddin Siddique; Samiullah Khan; Manzoor Hussain; Munawwaruz Zaman; Zia Qamar; Nazim Salim; Shahnaz Sheikh; Saleem Sherwani; Iftikar Syed; Mudassar Syed
1980 Moscow	India; Vasudevan Baskaran; Bir Bhadur Chettri; Sylvanus Dung Dung; Merwyn Fernandes; Zafar Iqbal; Maharaj Krishan Kaushik; Charanjit Kumar; Sommayya Maneypande; Allan Schofield; Mohammed Shahid; Davinder Singh; Gurmail Singh; Amarjit Singh Rana; Rajinder Singh Jr. Ravinder Pal Singh; Surinder Singh Sodhi	Spain; Juan Amat; Juan Arbós; Jaime Arbós; Javier Cabot; Ricardo Cabot; Miguel Chaves; Juan Coghen; Miguel de Paz; Francisco Fábregas; José Garcia; Rafael Garralda; Santiago Malgosa; Paulino Monsalve; Juan Pellón; Carlos Roca; Jaime Zumalacárregui	Soviet Union; Sos Hayrapetyan; Minneula Azizov; Valeri Belyakov; Viktor Deputatov; Aleksandr Goncharov; Aleksandr Gusev; Sergei Klevtsov; Viacheslav Lampeev; Aleksandr Miasnikov; Mikhail Nichepurenko; Leonid Pavlovski; Sergei Pleshakov; Vladimir Pleshakov; Aleksandr Sychyov; Oleg Zagorodnev; Farit Zigangirov
1984 Los Angeles	Pakistan; Syed Ghulam Moinuddin; Qasim Zia; Nasir Ali; Abdul Rashid Al-Hasan; Ayaz Mahmood; Naeem Akhtar; Kalimullah Khan; Manzoor Hussain; Hassan Sardar; Hanif Khan; Khalid Hamid; Shahid Ali Khan; Tauqeer Dar; Ishtiaq Ahmed; Saleem Sherwani; Mushtaq Ahmad	West Germany; Christian Bassemir; Stefan Blöcher; Dirk Brinkmann; Heiner Dopp; Carsten Fischer; Tobias Frank; Volker Fried; Thomas Gunst; Horst-Ulrich Hänel; Karl-Joachim Hürter; Andreas Keller; Reinhard Krull; Michael Peter; Thomas Reck; Ekkhard Schmidt-Opper; Markku Slawyk	Great Britain; Paul Barber; Stephen Batchelor; Kulbir Bhaura; Robert Cattrall; Richard Dodds; James Duthie; Norman Hughes; Sean Kerly; Richard Leman; Stephen Martin; Billy McConnell; Veryan Pappin; Jon Potter; Mark Precious; Ian Taylor; David Westcott
1988 Seoul	Great Britain; Paul Barber; Stephen Batchelor; Kulbir Bhaura; Robert Clift; Richard Dodds; David Faulkner; Russell Garcia; Martyn Grimley; Sean Kerly; Jimmy Kirkwood; Richard Leman; Stephen Martin; Veryan Pappin; Jon Potter; Imran Sherwani; Ian Taylor	West Germany; Stefan Blöcher; Dirk Brinkmann; Thomas Brinkmann; Heiner Dopp; Hans-Henning Fastrich; Carsten Fischer; Tobias Frank; Volker Fried; Horst-Ulrich Hänel; Michael Hilgers; Andreas Keller; Michael Metz; Andreas Mollandin; Thomas Reck; Christian Schliemann; Ekkhard Schmidt-Opper	Netherlands; Marc Benninga; Floris Jan Bovelander; Jacques Brinkman; JanBart Bodenhausen Maurits Crucq; Marc Delissen; Cees Jan Diepeveen; Patrick Faber; Ronald Jansen; René Klaassen; Hendrik Kooijman; Hidde Kruize; Frank Leistra; Erik Parlevliet; Gert Schlatmann; Tim Steens; Taco van den Honert
1992 Barcelona	Germany; Andreas Becker; Christian Blunck; Carsten Fischer; Volker Fried; Michael Hilgers; Andreas Keller; Michael Knauth; Oliver Kurtz; Christian Mayerhöfer; Sven Meinhardt; Michael Metz; Klaus Michler; Christopher Reitz; Stefan Saliger; Jan-Peter Tewes; Stefan Tewes	Australia; John Bestall; Warren Birmingham; Lee Bodimeade; Ashley Carey; Gregory Corbitt; Stephen Davies; Damon Diletti; Lachlan Dreher; Lachlan Elmer; Dean Evans; Paul Lewis; Graham Reid; Jay Stacy; David Wansbrough; Ken Wark; Michael York	Pakistan; Saeed Anjum; Farhat Hassan Khan; Khalid Bashir; Muhammad Khawaja; Mansoor Ahmed; Asif Bajwa; Ikhlaq Muhammad; Mohammad Khalid Sr; Qamar Muhammad; Hussain Musaddaq; Rana Mujahid; Shahbaz Ahmed; Muhammad Shahbaz; Shahid Ali Khan; Tahir Zaman; Wasim Feroz
1996 Atlanta	Netherlands; Floris Jan Bovelander; Jacques Brinkman; Maurits Crucq; Teun de Nooijer; Marc Delissen; Jeroen Delmee; Ronald Jansen; Erik Jazet; Leo Klein Gebbink; Bram Lomans; Taco van den Honert; Tycho van Meer; Wouter van Pelt; Remco van Wijk; Stephan Veen; Guus Vogels	Spain; Jaime Amat; Pablo Amat; Javier Arnau; Jordi Arnau; Óscar Barrena; Ignacio Cobos; Juan Dinarés; Juan Escarré; Xavier Escudé; Juantxo García-Mauriño; Antonio González; Ramón Jufresa; Joaquín Malgosa; Víctor Pujol; Ramón Sala; Pablo Usoz	Australia; Stuart Carruthers; Baeden Choppy; Stephen Davies; Damon Diletti; Lachlan Dreher; Lachlan Elmer; Brendan Garard; Paul Gaudoin; Mark Hager; Paul Lewis; Grant Smith; Matthew Smith; Daniel Sproule; Jay Stacy; Ken Wark; Michael York
2000 Sydney	Netherlands; Jacques Brinkman; Jaap-Derk Buma; Teun de Nooijer; Jeroen Delmee; Marten Eikelboom; Piet-Hein Geeris; Ronald Jansen; Erik Jazet; Bram Lomans; Sander van der Weide; Wouter van Pelt; Diederik van Weel; Remco van Wijk; Stephan Veen; Guus Vogels; Peter Windt	South Korea; Han Hyung-Bae; Hwang Jong-Hyun; Jeon Hong-Kwon; Jeon Jong-Ha; Ji Seung-Hwan; Kang Keon-Wook; Kim Chel-Hwan; Kim Jung-Chul; Kim Kyung-Seok; Kim Yong-Bae; Kim Yoon; Lim Jong-Chun; Lim Jung-Woo; Seo Jong-Ho; Song Seung-Tae; Yeo Woon-Kon	Australia; Michael Brennan; Adam Commens; Stephen Davies; Damon Diletti; Lachlan Dreher; Jason Duff; Troy Elder; James Elmer; Paul Gaudoin; Stephen Holt; Brent Livermore; Daniel Sproule; Jay Stacy; Craig Victory; Matthew Wells; Michael York
2004 Athens	Australia; Michael Brennan; Travis Brooks; Dean Butler; Liam de Young; Jamie Dwyer; Nathan Eglington; Troy Elder; Bevan George; Robert Hammond; Mark Hickman; Mark Knowles; Brent Livermore; Michael McCann; Stephen Mowlam; Grant Schubert; Matthew Wells	Netherlands; Matthijs Brouwer; Ronald Brouwer; Teun de Nooijer; Jeroen Delmee; Geert-Jan Derikx; Rob Derikx; Marten Eikelboom; Floris Evers; Erik Jazet; Karel Klaver; Jesse Mahieu; Rob Reckers; Taeke Taekema; Sander van der Weide; Klaas Veering; Guus Vogels	Germany; Clemens Arnold; Christoph Bechmann; Sebastian Biederlack; Philipp Crone; Eike Duckwitz; Christoph Eimer; Björn Emmerling; Florian Kunz; Björn Michel; Sascha Reinelt; Justus Scharowsky; Christian Schulte; Tibor Weißenborn; Timo Weß; Matthias Witthaus; Christopher Zeller
2008 Beijing	Germany; Philip Witte; Maximilian Müller; Sebastian Biederlack; Carlos Nevado; Moritz Fürste; Jan-Marco Montag; Tobias Hauke; Tibor Weißenborn; Benjamin Weß; Niklas Meinert; Timo Weß; Oliver Korn; Christopher Zeller; Max Weinhold; Matthias Witthaus; Florian Keller; Philipp Zeller	Spain; Francisco Cortes; Santiago Freixa; Francisco Fábregas; Víctor Sojo; Alex Fàbregas; Pablo Amat; Eduardo Tubau; Roc Oliva; Juan Fernandez; Ramón Alegre; Xavier Ribas; Albert Sala; Rodrigo Garza; Sergi Enrique; Eduard Arbós; David Alegre	Australia; Jamie Dwyer; Liam de Young; Rob Hammond; Mark Knowles; Eddie Ockenden; David Guest; Luke Doerner; Grant Schubert; Bevan George; Andre Smith; Stephen Lambert; Eli Matheson; Matthew Wells; Travis Brooks; Kiel Brown; Fergus Kavanagh; Des Abbott
2012 London	Germany; Maximilian Müller; Martin Häner; Oskar Deecke; Christopher Wesley; Moritz Fürste; Tobias Hauke; Jan-Philipp Rabente; Benjamin Weß; Timo Weß; Oliver Korn; Christopher Zeller; Max Weinhold; Matthias Witthaus; Florian Fuchs; Philipp Zeller; Thilo Stralkowski	Netherlands; Jaap Stockmann; Klaas Vermeulen; Marcel Balkestein; Wouter Jolie; Roderick Weusthof; Robbert Kemperman; Teun de Nooijer; Sander Baart; Floris Evers; Bob de Voogd; Sander de Wijn; Rogier Hofman; Robert van der Horst; Billy Bakker; Valentin Verga; Mink van der Weerden	Australia; Mark Knowles; Jamie Dwyer; Liam de Young; Simon Orchard; Glenn Turner; Chris Ciriello; Matthew Butturini; Russell Ford; Eddie Ockenden; Joel Carroll; Matthew Gohdes; Tim Deavin; Matthew Swann; Nathan Burgers; Kieran Govers; Fergus Kavanagh
2016 Rio de Janeiro	Argentina; Juan Manuel Vivaldi; Gonzalo Peillat; Juan Ignacio Gilardi; Facundo Callioni; Lucas Rey; Matías Paredes; Joaquín Menini; Lucas Vila; Ignacio Ortiz; Juan Martín López; Juan Manuel Saladino; Matías Rey; Manuel Brunet; Agustín Mazzilli; Lucas Rossi; Pedro Ibarra	Belgium; Arthur Van Doren; John-John Dohmen; Florent Van Aubel; Sébastien Dockier; Cédric Charlier; Gauthier Boccard; Emmanuel Stockbroekx; Thomas Briels; Félix Denayer; Vincent Vanasch; Simon Gougnard; Loïck Luypaert; Tom Boon; Jérôme Truyens; Elliot Van Strydonck; Tanguy Cosyns	Germany; Nicolas Jacobi; Matthias Müller; Linus Butt; Martin Häner; Moritz Trompertz; Mats Grambusch; Christopher Wesley; Timm Herzbruch; Tobias Hauke; Tom Grambusch; Christopher Rühr; Martin Zwicker; Moritz Fürste; Florian Fuchs; Timur Oruz; Niklas Wellen
2020 Tokyo	Belgium; Gauthier Boccard; Tom Boon; Thomas Briels; Cédric Charlier; Félix Denayer; Nicolas De Kerpel; Arthur De Sloover; Sébastien Dockier; John-John Dohmen; Simon Gougnard; Alexander Hendrickx; Antoine Kina; Loïck Luypaert; Augustin Meurmans; Victor Wegnez; Vincent Vanasch; Florent Van Aubel; Arthur Van Doren	Australia; Daniel Beale; Joshua Beltz; Tim Brand; Andrew Charter; Tom Craig; Matt Dawson; Blake Govers; Jeremy Hayward; Tim Howard; Dylan Martin; Trent Mitton; Eddie Ockenden; Flynn Ogilvie; Lachlan Sharp; Joshua Simmonds; Jacob Whetton; Tom Wickham; Aran Zalewski	India; Surender Kumar; Varun Kumar; Birendra Lakra; Vivek Prasad; Amit Rohidas; Dilpreet Singh; Gurjant Singh; Harmanpreet Singh; Hardik Singh; Mandeep Singh; Manpreet Singh; Rupinder Pal Singh; Shamsher Singh; Simranjeet Singh; Nilakanta Sharma; P. R. Sreejesh; Sumit Walmiki; Lalit Upadhyay
2024 Paris	Netherlands; Thierry Brinkman; Jip Janssen; Lars Balk; Jonas de Geus; Thijs van Dam; Seve van Ass; Jorrit Croon; Justen Blok; Derck de Vilder; Floris Wortelboer; Tjep Hoedemakers; Koen Bijen; Joep de Mol; Pirmin Blaak; Tijmen Reyenga; Duco Telgenkamp; Floris Middendorp	Germany; Mats Grambusch; Mathias Müller; Lukas Windfeder; Niklas Wellen; Johannes Große; Thies Prinz; Paul-Philipp Kaufmann; Teo Hinrichs; Tom Grambusch; Gonzalo Peillat; Christopher Rühr; Justus Weigand; Marco Miltkau; Martin Zwicker; Hannes Müller; Malte Hellwig; Moritz Ludwig; Jean Danneberg	India; Harmanpreet Singh; Jarmanpreet Singh; Abhishek Nain; Manpreet Singh; Hardik Singh; Gurjant Singh; Sanjay Rana; Mandeep Singh; Lalit Upadhyay; P. R. Sreejesh; Sumit Walmiki; Shamsher Singh; Raj Kumar Pal; Amit Rohidas; Vivek Prasad; Sukhjeet Singh
2028 Los Angeles			

== Women ==
Games	Gold	Silver	Bronze
1980 Moscow	Zimbabwe; Liz Chase; Sandra Chick; Gillian Cowley; Patricia Davies; Sarah English; Maureen George; Ann Grant; Susan Huggett; Patricia McKillop; Brenda Phillips; Christine Prinsloo; Sonia Robertson; Anthea Stewart; Helen Volk; Linda Watson	Czechoslovakia; Milada Blažková; Jiřina Čermáková; Jiřina Hájková; Berta Hrubá; Ida Hubáčková; Jiřina Kadlecová; Jarmila Králíčková; Jiřina Křížová; Alena Kyselicová; Jana Lahodová; Květa Petříčková; Viera Podhányiová; Iveta Šranková; Marie Sýkorová; Marta Urbanová; Lenka Vymazalová	Soviet Union; Liailia Akhmerova; Natalia Buzunova; Natalia Bykova; Tatiana Embakhtova; Nadezhda Filippova; Liudmila Frolova; Lidia Glubokova; Nelli Gorbatkova; Elena Guryeva; Galina Inzhuvatova; Alina Kham; Natella Krasnikova; Nadezhda Ovechkina; Tatiana Shvyganova; Galina Viuzhanina; Valentina Zazdravnykh
1984 Los Angeles	Netherlands; Carina Benninga; Fieke Boekhorst; Marjolein Eijsvogel; Det de Beus; Irene Hendriks; Elsemiek Hillen; Sandra Le Poole; Anneloes Nieuwenhuizen; Martine Ohr; Alette Pos; Lisette Sevens; Marieke van Doorn; Aletta van Manen; Sophie von Weiler; Laurien Willemse; Margriet Zegers	West Germany; Gabriele Appel; Dagmar Breiken; Beate Deininger; Elke Drüll; Birgit Hagen; Birgit Hahn; Martina Koch; Sigrid Landgraf; Corinna Lingnau; Christina Moser; Patricia Ott; Hella Roth; Gabriela Schley; Susanne Schmid; Ursula Thielemann; Andrea Weiermann-Lietz	United States; Beth Anders; Beth Beglin; Regina Buggy; Gwen Cheeseman; Sheryl Johnson; Christine Larson-Mason; Kathleen McGahey; Anita Miller; Leslie Milne; Charlene Morett; Diane Moyer; Marcella Place; Karen Shelton; Brenda Stauffer; Julie Staver; Judy Strong
1988 Seoul	Australia; Tracey Belbin; Deborah Bowman; Lee Capes; Michelle Capes; Sally Carbon; Elspeth Clement; Loretta Dorman; Maree Fish; Rechelle Hawkes; Lorraine Hillas; Kathleen Partridge; Sharon Patmore; Jackie Pereira; Sandra Pisani; Kim Small; Liane Tooth	South Korea; Chang Eun-Jung; Cho Ki-Hyang; Choi Choon-Ok; Chung Eun-Kyung; Chung Sang-Hyun; Han Gum Shil; Han Ok-Kyung; Hwang Keum-Sook; Jin Won-Sim; Kim Mi-Sun; Kim Soon-Duk; Kim Young-sook; Lim Kye-Sook; Park Soon-Ja; Seo Hyo-Sun; Seo Kwang-Mi	Netherlands; Willemien Aardenburg; Carina Benninga; Marjolein Eijsvogel; Yvonne Buter; Det de Beus; Annemieke Fokke; Noor Holsboer; Helen van der Ben; Lisanne Lejeune; Anneloes Nieuwenhuizen; Martine Ohr; Marieke van Doorn; Aletta van Manen; Sophie von Weiler; Laurien Willemse; Ingrid Wolff
1992 Barcelona	Spain; María Carmen Barea; Sonia Barrio; Mercedes Coghen; Celia Corres; Natalia Dorado; Nagore Gabellanes; Mariví González; Anna Maiques; Silvia Manrique; Elisabeth Maragall; María Isabel Martínez; Teresa Motos; Nuria Olivé; Virginia Ramírez; María Ángeles Rodríguez; Maider Tellería	Germany; Britta Becker; Tanja Dickenscheid; Nadine Ernsting-Krienke; Christine Ferneck; Eva Hagenbäumer; Franziska Hentschel; Caren Jungjohann; Katrin Kauschke; Irina Kuhnt; Heike Lätzsch; Susanne Müller; Tina Peters; Simone Thomaschinski; Bianca Weiß; Anke Wild; Susie Wollschläger	Great Britain; Jill Atkins; Lisa Bayliss; Karen Brown; Vickey Dixon; Susan Fraser; Wendy Fraser; Kathryn Johnson; Sandy Lister; Jackie McWilliams; Tammy Miller; Helen Morgan; Mary Nevill; Mandy Nicholls; Alison Ramsay; Jane Sixsmith; Joanne Thompson
1996 Atlanta	Australia; Michelle Andrews; Alyson Annan; Louise Dobson; Renita Farrell; Juliet Haslam; Rechelle Hawkes; Clover Maitland; Karen Marsden; Jenn Morris; Jackie Pereira; Nova Peris-Kneebone; Katrina Powell; Lisa Powell; Danni Roche; Kate Starre; Liane Tooth	South Korea; Chang Eun-Jung; Cho Eun-Jung; Choi Eun-Kyung; Choi Mi-Soon; Jeon Young-Sun; Jin Deok-San; Kim Myung-Ok; Kwon Soo-Hyun; Kwon Chang-Sook; Lee Eun-Kyung; Lee Eun-Young; Lee Ji-Young; Lim Jeong-Sook; Oh Seung-Shin; Woo Hyun-Jung; You Jae-Sook	Netherlands; Stella de Heij; Wietske de Ruiter; Mijntje Donners; Willemijn Duyster; Noor Holsboer; Nicole Koolen; Ellen Kuipers; Jeannette Lewin; Suzanne Plesman; Florentine Steenberghe; Margje Teeuwen; Carole Thate; Jacqueline Toxopeus; Fleur van de Kieft; Dillianne van den Boogaard; Suzan van der Wielen
2000 Sydney	Australia; Kate Allen; Alyson Annan; Lisa Carruthers; Renita Farrell; Juliet Haslam; Rechelle Hawkes; Nikki Hudson; Rachel Imison; Clover Maitland; Claire Mitchell-Taverner; Jenn Morris; Alison Peek; Katrina Powell; Angie Skirving; Kate Starre; Julie Towers	Argentina; Magdalena Aicega; Mariela Antoniska; Inés Arrondo; Luciana Aymar; María Paz Ferrari; Anabel Gambero; Soledad García; María de la Paz Hernández; Laura Maiztegui; Mercedes Margalot; Karina Masotta; Vanina Oneto; Jorgelina Rimoldi; Cecilia Rognoni; Ayelén Stepnik; Paola Vukojicic	Netherlands; Minke Booij; Ageeth Boomgaardt; Julie Deiters; Mijntje Donners; Fatima Moreira de Melo; Clarinda Sinnige; Hanneke Smabers; Minke Smeets; Margje Teeuwen; Carole Thate; Daphne Touw; Fleur van de Kieft; Dillianne van den Boogaard; Macha van der Vaart; Suzan van der Wielen; Myrna Veenstra
2004 Athens	Germany; Tina Bachmann; Caroline Casaretto; Nadine Ernsting-Krienke; Franziska Gude; Mandy Haase; Natascha Keller; Denise Klecker; Anke Kühn; Heike Lätzsch; Badri Latif; Sonja Lehmann; Silke Müller; Fanny Rinne; Marion Rodewald; Louisa Walter; Julia Zwehl	Netherlands; Minke Booij; Chantal de Bruijn; Lisanne de Roever; Mijntje Donners; Sylvia Karres; Fatima Moreira de Melo; Eefke Mulder; Maartje Scheepstra; Janneke Schopman; Clarinda Sinnige; Minke Smeets; Jiske Snoeks; Macha van der Vaart; Miek van Geenhuizen; Lieve van Kessel	Argentina; Magdalena Aicega; Mariela Antoniska; Inés Arrondo; Luciana Aymar; Claudia Burkart; Marina di Giacomo; Soledad García; Mariana González; Alejandra Gulla; María de la Paz Hernández; Mercedes Margalot; Vanina Oneto; Cecilia Rognoni; Mariné Russo; Ayelén Stepnik; Paola Vukojicic
2008 Beijing	Netherlands; Maartje Goderie; Maartje Paumen; Naomi van As; Minke Smeets; Marilyn Agliotti; Minke Booij; Wieke Dijkstra; Sophie Polkamp; Ellen Hoog; Lidewij Welten; Lisanne de Roever; Miek van Geenhuizen; Eva de Goede; Janneke Schopman; Eefke Mulder; Fatima Moreira de Melo	China; Ren Ye; Zhang Yimeng; Gao Lihua; Chen Qiuqi; Zhao Yudiao; Li Hongxia; Cheng Hui; Tang Chunling; Zhou Wanfeng; Ma Yibo; Fu Baorong; Pan Fengzhen; Huang Junxia; Song Qingling; Li Shuang; Chen Zhaoxia	Argentina; Paola Vukojicic; Belén Succi; Magdalena Aicega; Mercedes Margalot; Mariana Rossi; Noel Barrionuevo; Giselle Kañevsky; Claudia Burkart; Luciana Aymar; Mariné Russo; Mariana González Oliva; Soledad García; Alejandra Gulla; María de la Paz Hernández; Carla Rebecchi; Rosario Luchetti
2012 London	Netherlands; Kitty van Male; Carlien Dirkse van den Heuvel; Kelly Jonker; Maartje Goderie; Lidewij Welten; Maartje Paumen; Naomi van As; Ellen Hoog; Sophie Polkamp; Joyce Sombroek; Kim Lammers; Eva de Goede; Marilyn Agliotti; Merel de Blaeij; Margot van Geffen; Caia van Maasakker	Argentina; Laura del Colle; Rosario Luchetti; Macarena Rodríguez; Luciana Aymar; Carla Rebecchi; Delfina Merino; Martina Cavallero; Florencia Habif; Rocío Sánchez Moccia; Daniela Sruoga; Sofía Maccari; Mariela Scarone; Silvina D'Elía; Noel Barrionuevo; Josefina Sruoga; Florencia Mutio	Great Britain; Beth Storry; Emily Maguire; Laura Unsworth; Crista Cullen; Anne Panter; Hannah Macleod; Helen Richardson; Kate Walsh; Chloe Rogers; Laura Bartlett; Alex Danson; Georgie Twigg; Ashleigh Ball; Sally Walton; Nicola White; Sarah Thomas
2016 Rio de Janeiro	Great Britain; Maddie Hinch; Laura Unsworth; Crista Cullen; Hannah Macleod; Georgie Twigg; Helen Richardson-Walsh; Susannah Townsend; Kate Richardson-Walsh; Sam Quek; Alex Danson; Giselle Ansley; Sophie Bray; Hollie Webb; Shona McCallin; Lily Owsley; Nicola White	Netherlands; Joyce Sombroek; Xan de Waard; Kitty van Male; Laurien Leurink; Willemijn Bos; Marloes Keetels; Carlien Dirkse van den Heuvel; Kelly Jonker; Maria Verschoor; Lidewij Welten; Caia van Maasakker; Maartje Paumen; Naomi van As; Ellen Hoog; Margot van Geffen; Eva de Goede	Germany; Nike Lorenz; Selin Oruz; Anne Schröder; Lisa Schütze; Charlotte Stapenhorst; Katharina Otte; Janne Müller-Wieland; Hannah Krüger; Jana Teschke; Lisa Altenburg; Franzisca Hauke; Cécile Pieper; Marie Mävers; Annika Sprink; Julia Müller; Pia-Sophie Oldhafer; Kristina Reynolds
2020 Tokyo	Netherlands; Felice Albers; Eva de Goede; Xan de Waard; Marloes Keetels; Josine Koning; Sanne Koolen; Laurien Leurink; Frédérique Matla; Laura Nunnink; Malou Pheninckx; Pien Sanders; Lauren Stam; Margot van Geffen; Caia van Maasakker; Maria Verschoor; Lidewij Welten	Argentina; Agustina Albertario; Agostina Alonso; Noel Barrionuevo; Valentina Costa Biondi; Emilia Forcherio; Agustina Gorzelany; María José Granatto; Victoria Granatto; Julieta Jankunas; Sofía Maccari; Delfina Merino; Valentina Raposo; Rocío Sánchez Moccia; Micaela Retegui; Victoria Sauze; Belén Succi; Sofía Toccalino; Eugenia Trinchinetti	Great Britain; Giselle Ansley; Grace Balsdon; Fiona Crackles; Maddie Hinch; Sarah Jones; Hannah Martin; Shona McCallin; Lily Owsley; Hollie Pearne-Webb; Isabelle Petter; Ellie Rayer; Sarah Robertson; Anna Toman; Susannah Townsend; Laura Unsworth; Leah Wilkinson
2024 Paris	Netherlands; Xan de Waard; Anne Veenendaal; Luna Fokke; Freeke Moes; Lisa Post; Yibbi Jansen; Renée van Laarhoven; Felice Albers; Maria Verschoor; Sanne Koolen; Frédérique Matla; Joosje Burg; Marleen Jochems; Pien Sanders; Marijn Veen; Laura Nunnink	China; Ou Zixia; Ye Jiao; Gu Bingfeng; Yang Liu; Zhang Ying; Chen Yi; Ma Ning; Li Hong; Dan Wen; Zou Meirong; He Jiangxin; Fan Yunxia; Chen Yang; Xu Wenyu; Zhong Jiaqi; Tan Jinzhuang; Yu Anhui	Argentina; Sofía Toccalino; Agustina Gorzelany; Valentina Raposo; Agostina Alonso; Agustina Albertario; María José Granatto; Cristina Cosentino; Rocío Sánchez Moccia; Victoria Sauze; Sofía Cairó; Eugenia Trinchinetti; Lara Casas; Juana Castellaro; Pilar Campoy; Julieta Jankunas; Zoe Díaz
2028 Los Angeles			
