= List of 1920 Summer Olympics medal winners =

The 1920 Summer Olympics (French: Jeux olympiques d'été de 1920; Dutch: Olympische Zomerspelen van 1920; German: Olympische Sommerspiele 1920), officially known as the Games of the VII Olympiad (French: Jeux de la VII^{e} olympiade; Dutch: Spelen van de VIIe Olympiade; German: Spiele der VII. Olympiade) and commonly known as Antwerp 1920 (French: Anvers 1920; Dutch and German: Antwerpen 1920), were an international multi-sport event held in 1920 in Antwerp, Belgium. Twenty-nine nations and 2,678 competitors, including 65 women, competed in 162 events in 24 sports.

== Archery ==
Event	Gold	Silver	Bronze
Individual fixed large bird	Edmond Cloetens; Belgium	Louis Van de Perck; Belgium	Firmin Flamand; Belgium
Team fixed large bird	Belgium; Edmond Cloetens; Louis Van de Perck; Firmin Flamand; Edmond Van Moer; Joseph Hermans; Auguste Van de Verre	No further competitors	No further competitors
Individual fixed small bird	Edmond Van Moer; Belgium	Louis Van de Perck; Belgium	Joseph Hermans; Belgium
Team fixed small bird	Belgium; Edmond Cloetens; Louis Van de Perck; Firmin Flamand; Edmond Van Moer; Joseph Hermans; Auguste Van de Verre	No further competitors	No further competitors
Individual moving bird, 50 metres	Julien Brulé; France	Hubert Van Innis; Belgium	No further competitors
Team moving bird, 50 metres	Belgium; Alphonse Allaert; Hubert Van Innis; Edmond De Knibber; Louis Delcon; Jérome De Maeyer; Pierre Van Thielt; Louis Fierens; Louis Van Beeck	France; Julien Brulé; Léonce Quentin; Pascal Fauvel; Eugène Grisot; Eugène Richez; Arthur Mabellon; Léon Epin; Paul Leroy	No further competitors
Individual moving bird, 33 metres	Hubert Van Innis; Belgium	Julien Brulé; France	No further competitors
Team moving bird, 33 metres	Belgium; Alphonse Allaert; Hubert Van Innis; Edmond De Knibber; Louis Delcon; Jérome De Maeyer; Pierre Van Thielt; Louis Fierens; Louis Van Beeck	France; Julien Brulé; Léonce Quentin; Pascal Fauvel; Eugène Grisot; Eugène Richez; Arthur Mabellon; Léon Epin; Paul Leroy	No further competitors
Individual moving bird, 28 metres	Hubert Van Innis; Belgium	Léonce Quentin; France	No further competitors
Team moving bird, 28 metres	Netherlands; Janus Theeuwes; Driekske van Bussel; Joep Packbiers; Janus van Merrienboer; Jo van Gastel; Theo Willems; Piet de Brouwer; Tiest van Gestel	Belgium; Hubert Van Innis; Alphonse Allaert; Edmond De Knibber; Louis Delcon; Jérome De Maeyer; Pierre Van Thielt; Louis Fierens; Louis Van Beeck	France; Julien Brulé; Léonce Quentin; Pascal Fauvel; Eugène Grisot; Eugène Richez; Arthur Mabellon; Léon Epin; Paul Leroy

== Athletics ==
Event	Gold	Silver	Bronze
100 metres	Charles Paddock; United States	Morris Kirksey; United States	Harry Edward; Great Britain
200 metres	Allen Woodring; United States	Charles Paddock; United States	Harry Edward; Great Britain
400 metres	Bevil Rudd; South Africa	Guy Butler; Great Britain	Nils Engdahl; Sweden
800 metres	Albert Hill; Great Britain	Earl Eby; United States	Bevil Rudd; South Africa
1500 metres	Albert Hill; Great Britain	Philip Noel-Baker; Great Britain	Lawrence Shields; United States
5000 metres	Joseph Guillemot; France	Paavo Nurmi; Finland	Eric Backman; Sweden
10,000 metres	Paavo Nurmi; Finland	Joseph Guillemot; France	James Wilson; Great Britain
110 metres hurdles	Earl Thomson; Canada	Harold Barron; United States	Feg Murray; United States
400 metres hurdles	Frank Loomis; United States	John Norton; United States	August Desch; United States
3,000 metres steeplechase	Percy Hodge; Great Britain	Patrick Flynn; United States	Ernesto Ambrosini; Italy
4 × 100 metres relay	United States; Charles Paddock; Jackson Scholz; Loren Murchison; Morris Kirksey	France; René Lorain; René Tirard; René Mourlon; Émile Ali-Khan	Sweden; Agne Holmström; William Petersson; Sven Malm; Nils Sandström
4 × 400 metres relay	Great Britain; Cecil Griffiths; Robert Lindsay; John Ainsworth-Davis; Guy Butler	South Africa; Henry Dafel; Clarence Oldfield; Jack Oosterlaak; Bevil Rudd	France; Géo André; Gaston Féry; Maurice Delvart; André Devaux
3000 metres team race	United States; Horace Brown; Arlie Schardt; Ivan Dresser	Great Britain; Joe Blewitt; Albert Hill; William Seagrove	Sweden; Eric Backman; Sven Lundgren; Edvin Wide
Marathon	Hannes Kolehmainen; Finland	Jüri Lossmann; Estonia	Valerio Arri; Italy
3 kilometres walk	Ugo Frigerio; Italy	George Parker; Australia	Richard Remer; United States
10 kilometres walk	Ugo Frigerio; Italy	Joseph Pearman; United States	Charles Gunn; Great Britain
High jump	Richmond Landon; United States	Harold Muller; United States	Bo Ekelund; Sweden
Pole vault	Frank Foss; United States	Henry Petersen; Denmark	Edwin Myers; United States
Long jump	William Petersson; Sweden	Carl Johnson; United States	Erik Abrahamsson; Sweden
Triple jump	Vilho Tuulos; Finland	Folke Jansson; Sweden	Erik Almlöf; Sweden
Shot put	Ville Pörhölä; Finland	Elmer Niklander; Finland	Harry Liversedge; United States
Discus throw	Elmer Niklander; Finland	Armas Taipale; Finland	Gus Pope; United States
Hammer throw	Patrick Ryan; United States	Carl Johan Lind; Sweden	Basil Bennett; United States
Javelin throw	Jonni Myyrä; Finland	Urho Peltonen; Finland	Pekka Johansson; Finland
56 lb (25 kg) weight throw	Pat McDonald; United States	Patrick Ryan; United States	Carl Johan Lind; Sweden
Pentathlon	Eero Lehtonen; Finland	Everett Bradley; United States	Hugo Lahtinen; Finland
Decathlon	Helge Løvland; Norway	Brutus Hamilton; United States	Bertil Ohlson; Sweden
Individual cross country	Paavo Nurmi; Finland	Eric Backman; Sweden	Heikki Liimatainen; Finland
Team cross country	Finland; Paavo Nurmi; Heikki Liimatainen; Teodor Koskenniemi	Great Britain; James Wilson; Anton Hegarty; Alfred Nichols	Sweden; Eric Backman; Gustaf Mattsson; Hilding Ekman

== Boxing ==
Games	Gold	Silver	Bronze
Flyweight (−50.8 kg / 112 lb)	Frankie Genaro; United States	Anders Petersen; Denmark	William Cuthbertson; Great Britain
Bantamweight (−53.5 kg / 118 lb)	Clarence Walker; South Africa	Chris Graham; Canada	George McKenzie; Great Britain
Featherweight (−57.2 kg / 126 lb)	Paul Fritsch; France	Jean Gachet; France	Edoardo Garzena; Italy
Lightweight (−61.2 kg / 135 lb)	Samuel Mosberg; United States	Gotfred Johansen; Denmark	Clarence Newton; Canada
Welterweight (−66.7 kg / 147 lb)	Bert Schneider; Canada	Alexander Ireland; Great Britain	Frederick Colberg; United States
Middleweight (−72.6 kg / 160 lb)	Harry Mallin; Great Britain	Georges Prud'Homme; Canada	Moe Herscovitch; Canada
Light heavyweight (−79.4 kg / 175 lb)	Eddie Eagan; United States	Sverre Sørsdal; Norway	Harold Franks; Great Britain
Heavyweight (over 79.4 kg/175 lb)	Ronald Rawson; Great Britain	Søren Petersen; Denmark	Albert Eluère; France

== Cycling ==
=== Road cycling ===
Games	Gold	Silver	Bronze
Individual time trial	Harry Stenqvist (SWE)	Henry Kaltenbrun (RSA)	Fernand Canteloube (FRA)
Team time trial	France; Achille Souchard; Fernand Canteloube; Georges Detreille; Marcel Gobillot	Sweden; Harry Stenqvist; Sigfrid Lundberg; Ragnar Malm; Axel Persson	Belgium; Albert Wyckmans; Albert De Bunné; Bernard Janssens; André Vercruysse

=== Track cycling ===
Games	Gold	Silver	Bronze
Sprint	Maurice Peeters (NED)	Horace Johnson (GBR)	Harry Ryan (GBR)
50 kilometres	Henry George (BEL)	Cyril Alden (GBR)	Piet Ikelaar (NED)
Tandem	Thomas Lance and Harry Ryan (GBR)	William Smith and James Walker (RSA)	Frans de Vreng and Piet Ikelaar (NED)
Team pursuit	Italy; Primo Magnani; Arnaldo Carli; Ruggerio Ferrario; Franco Giorgetti	Great Britain; Albert White; Cyril Alden; Horace Johnson; William Stewart	South Africa; James Walker; Sammy Goosen; Henry Kaltenbrun; William Smith

== Diving ==
=== Men ===
Games	Gold	Silver	Bronze
3 m springboard	Louis Kuehn (USA)	Clarence Pinkston (USA)	Louis Balbach (USA)
10 m platform	Clarence Pinkston (USA)	Erik Adlerz (SWE)	Harry Prieste (USA)
Plain high diving	Arvid Wallman (SWE)	Nils Skoglund (SWE)	John Jansson (SWE)

=== Women ===
Games	Gold	Silver	Bronze
3 m springboard	Aileen Riggin (USA)	Helen Wainwright (USA)	Thelma Payne (USA)
10 m platform	Stefanie Clausen (DEN)	Beatrice Armstrong (GBR)	Eva Olliwier (SWE)

== Equestrian ==
Games	Gold	Silver	Bronze
Individual dressage	Janne Lundblad on Uno (SWE)	Bertil Sandström on Sabel (SWE)	Hans von Rosen on Running Sister (SWE)
Individual eventing	Helmer Mörner on Germania (SWE)	Åge Lundström on Ysra (SWE)	Ettore Caffaratti on Caniche (ITA)
Team eventing	Sweden; Helmer Mörner and Germania; Åge Lundström and Ysra; Georg von Braun and Diana; Gustaf Dyrsch and Salamis	Italy; Ettore Caffaratti and Caniche; Garibaldi Spighi and Otello; Giulio Cacciandra and Facetto; Carlo Asinari and Savari	Belgium; Roger Moeremans d'Emaüs and Sweet Girl; Oswald Lints and Martha; Jules Bonvalet and Weppelghem; Jacques Misonne and Gaucho
Individual jumping	Tommaso Lequio di Assaba on Trebecco (ITA)	Alessandro Valerio on Cento (ITA)	Carl Gustaf Lewenhaupt on Mon Coeur (SWE)
Team jumping	Sweden; Claës König and Tresor; Hans von Rosen and Poor Boy; Daniel Norling and Eros II; Frank Martin and Kohort	Belgium; Henri Laame and Biscuit; André Coumans and Lisette; Herman de Gaiffier d'Hestroy and Miss; Herman d'Oultromont and Lord Kitchener	Italy; Ettore Caffaratti and Traditore; Alessandro Alvisi and Raggio di Sole; Giulio Cacciandra and Fortunello; Carlo Asinari and Varone
Individual vaulting	Daniel Bouckaert (BEL)	Field (FRA)	Louis Finet (BEL)
Team vaulting	Belgium; Daniel Bouckaert; Louis Finet; Maurice Van Ranst	France; Field; Salins; Cauchy	Sweden; Carl Green; Anders Mårtensson; Oskar Nilsson

== Fencing ==
Games	Gold	Silver	Bronze
Épée, Individual	Armand Massard; France	Alexandre Lippmann; France	Gustave Buchard; France
Épée, Team	Italy; Aldo Nadi; Nedo Nadi; Abelardo Olivier; Giovanni Canova; Dino Urbani; Tullio Bozza; Andrea Marrazzi; Antonio Allochio; Tommaso Constantino; Paolo Thaon di Revel	Belgium; Paul Anspach; Léon Tom; Ernest Gevers; Félix Goblet D'aviella; Victor Boin; Joseph De Craecker; Philippe Le Hardy De Beaulieu; Fernand de Montigny	France; Armand Massard; Alexandre Lippmann; Gustave Buchard; Georges Casanova; Georges Trombert; Gaston Amson; Louis Moureau
Foil, Individual	Nedo Nadi; Italy	Philippe Cattiau; France	Roger Ducret; France
Foil, Team	Italy; Aldo Nadi; Nedo Nadi; Abelardo Olivier; Pietro Speciale; Rodolfo Terlizzi; Oreste Puliti; Tommaso Constantino; Baldo Baldi	France; André Labattut; Georges Trombert; Marcel Perrot; Lucien Gaudin; Philippe Cattiau; Roger Ducret; Gaston Amson; Lionel Bony De Castellane	United States; Francis Honeycutt; Arthur Lyon; Robert Sears; Henry Breckinridge; Harold Rayner
Sabre, Individual	Nedo Nadi; Italy	Aldo Nadi; Italy	Adrianus De Jong; Netherlands
Sabre, Team	Italy; Aldo Nadi; Nedo Nadi; Francesco Gargano; Oreste Puliti; Giorgio Santelli; Dino Urbani; Federico Cesarano; Baldo Baldi	France; Jean Margraff; Marc Marie Jean Perrodon; Henri Marie Raoul De Saint Germain; Georges Trombert	Netherlands; Jan Van Der Wiel; Adrianus De Jong; Jetze Doorman; Willem Van Blijenburgh; Louis Delaunoy; Salomon Zeldenrust

== Field hockey ==
Gold	Silver	Bronze
Great Britain; Charles Atkin; John Bennett; Colin Campbell; Harold Cassels; Harold Cooke; Eric Crockford; Reginald Crummack; Harry Haslam; Arthur Leighton; Charles Marcon; John MacBryan; George McGrath; Stanley Shoveller; William Smith; Cyril Wilkinson	Denmark; Hans Bjerrum; Ejvind Blach; Niels Blach; Steen Due; Thorvald Eigenbrod; Frands Faber; Hans Jørgen Hansen Hans Herlak; Henning Holst; Erik Husted; Paul Metz; Andreas Rasmussen	Belgium; André Becquet; Pierre Chibert; Raoul Daufresne de la Chevalerie; Fernand de Montigny; Charles Delelienne; Louis Diercxsens; Robert Gevers; Adolphe Goemaere; Charles Gniette; Raymond Keppens; René Strauwen; Pierre Valcke; Maurice van den Bemden; Jean van Nerom

== Figure skating ==
Games	Gold	Silver	Bronze
Men's singles	Gillis Grafström; Sweden	Andreas Krogh; Norway	Martin Stixrud; Norway
Ladies' singles	Magda Mauroy-Julin; Sweden	Svea Norén; Sweden	Theresa Weld; United States
Pair skating	Ludowika Jakobsson and Walter Jakobsson; Finland	Alexia Bryn and Yngvar Bryn; Norway	Phyllis Johnson and Basil Williams; Great Britain

== Football ==
Gold	Silver	Bronze
Belgium: Félix Balyu; Désiré Bastin; Mathieu Bragard; Robert Coppée; Jean De Bie; André Fierens; Emile Hanse; Georges Hebdin; Louis van Hege; Henri Larnoe; Joseph Musch; Fernand Nisot; Armand Swartenbroeks; Oscar Verbeeck; Coach: Raoul Daufresne	Spain: Patricio Arabolaza; Mariano Arrate; Juan Artola; José María Belauste; Sabino Bilbao; Ramón Eguiazábal; Agustín Eizaguirre; Ramón Gil; Domingo Acedo; Silverio Izaguirre; Pichichi; Luis Otero; Francisco Pagazaurtundúa; José Samitier; Agustín Sancho; Félix Sesúmaga; Pedro Vallana; Joaquín Vázquez; Ricardo Zamora; Coach: Francisco Bru	Netherlands: Arie Bieshaar; Leo Bosschart; Evert Jan Bulder; Jaap Bulder; Harry Dénis; Jan van Dort; Ber Groosjohan; Felix von Heijden; Frits Kuipers; Dick MacNeill; Jan de Natris; Oscar van Rappard; Henk Steeman; Ben Verweij; Coach: Fred Warburton

== Gymnastics ==
Games	Gold	Silver	Bronze
All-around, Individual	Giorgio Zampori; Italy	Marco Torrès; France	Jean Gounot; France
All-Around, Team	Italy; Arnaldo Andreoli; Ettore Bellotto; Pietro Bianchi; Fernando Bonatti; Luigi Cambiaso; Luigi Contessi; Carlo Costigliolo; Luigi Costigliolo; Giuseppe Domenichelli; Roberto Ferrari; Carlo Fregosi; Romualdo Ghiglione; Ambrogio Levati; Francesco Loi; Vittorio Lucchetti; Luigi Maiocco; Ferdinando Mandrini; Lorenzo Mangiante; Antonio Marovelli; Michele Mastromarino; Giuseppe Paris; Manlio Pastorini; Ezio Roselli; Paolo Salvi; Giovanni Tubino; Giorgio Zampori; Angelo Zorzi	Belgium; Eugenius Auwerkerken; Théophile Bauer; François Claessens; Augustus Cootmans; Frans Gibens; Albert Haepers; Domien Jacob; Félicien Kempeneers; Jules Labéeu; Hubert Lafortune; Auguste Landrieu; Charles Lannie; Constant Loriot; Nicolaas Moerloos; Ferdinand Minnaert; Louis Stoop; Jean Van Guysse; Alphonse Van Mele; François Verboven; Jean Verboven; Julien Verdonck; Joseph Verstraeten; Georges Vivex; Julianus Wagemans	France; Georges Berger; Émile Bouchès; René Boulanger; Alfred Buyenne; Eugène Cordonnier; Léon Delsarte; Lucien Démanet; Paul Durin; Georges Duvant; Fernand Fauconnier; Arthur Hermann; Albert Hersoy; André Higelin; Auguste Hoël; Louis Quempe; Georges Lagouge; Paulin Lemaire; Ernest Lespinasse; Émile Boitelle; Jules Pirard; Eugène Pollet; Georges Thurnherr; Marco Torrès; François Walker; Julien Wartelle; Paul Wartelle
Team, free system	Denmark; Georg Albertsen; Rudolf Andersen; Viggo Dibbern; Aage Frandsen; Hugo Helsten; Harry Holm; Herold Jansson; Robert Johnsen; Christian Juhl; Vilhelm Lange; Svend Madsen; Peder Marcussen; Peder Møller; Niels Turin Nielsen; Steen Olsen; Christian Pedersen; Stig Rønne; Harry Sørensen; Christian Thomas; Knud Vermehren	Norway; Alf Aanning; Karl Aas; Jørgen Andersen; Gustav Bayer; Jørgen Bjørnstad; Asbjørn Bodahl; Eilert Bøhm; Trygve Bøyesen; Ingolf Davidsen; Håkon Endreson; Jacob Erstad; Harald Færstad; Hermann Helgesen; Petter Hol; Otto Johannessen; John Anker Johansen; Torbjørn Kristoffersen; Henrik Nielsen; Jacob Opdahl; Arthur Rydstrøm; Frithjof Sælen; Bjørn Skjærpe; Wilhelm Steffensen; Olav Sundal; Reidar Tønsberg; Lauritz Wigand-Larsen	No further competitors
Team, Swedish system	Sweden; Fausto Acke; Albert Andersson; Arvid Andersson-Holtman; Helge Bäckander; Bengt Bengtsson; Fabian Biörck; Erik Charpentier; Sture Ericsson-Ewréus; Konrad Granström; Helge Gustafsson; Åke Häger; Ture Hedman; Sven Johnson; Sven-Olof Jonsson; Karl Lindahl; Edmund Lindmark; Bengt Mohrberg; Frans Persson; Klas Särner; Curt Sjöberg; Gunnar Söderlindh; John Sörenson; Erik Svensén; Gösta Törner	Denmark; Johannes Birk; Frede Hansen; Frederik Hansen; Kristian Hansen; Hans Jakobsen; Aage Jørgensen; Alfred Frøkjær Jørgensen; Alfred Ollerup Jørgensen; Arne Jørgensen; Knud Kirkeløkke; Jens Lambæk; Kristian Larsen; Kristian Madsen; Niels Erik Nielsen; Niels Kristian Nielsen; Dynes Pedersen; Hans Pedersen; Johannes Pedersen; Peter Dorf Pedersen; Rasmus Rasmussen; Hans Christian Sørensen; Hans Laurids Sørensen; Søren Sørensen; Georg Vest; Aage Walther	Belgium; Paul Arets; Léon Bronckaert; Léopold Clabots; Jean-Baptiste Claessens; Léon Darrien; Lucien Dehoux; Ernest Deleu; Émile Duboisson; Ernest Dureuil; Joseph Fiems; Marcel Hansen; Louis Henin; Omer Hoffman; Félix Logiest; Charles Maerschalck; René Paenhuijsen; Arnold Pierrot; René Pinchart; Gaspard Pirotte; Augustien Pluys; Léopold Son; Édouard Taeymans; Pierre Thiriar; Henri Verhavert

== Ice hockey ==
Gold	Silver	Bronze
Canada Robert Benson; Walter Byron; Frank Fredrickson; Chris Fridfinnson; Magnus Goodman; Haldor Halderson; Konrad Johannesson; Allan Woodman	United States Raymond Bonney; Anthony Conroy; Herbert Drury; Edward Fitzgerald; George Geran; Frank Goheen; Joseph McCormick; Lawrence McCormick; Frank Synott; Leon Tuck; Cyril Weidenborner	Czechoslovakia Karel Hartmann; Vilém Loos; Jan Palouš; Jan Peka; Karel Pešek; Josef Šroubek; Otakar Vindyš; Karel Wälzer

== Modern pentathlon ==
- Gustaf Dyrssen
- Erik de Laval
- Gösta Runö

== Polo ==
Gold	Silver	Bronze
Great Britain; Teignmouth Philip Melvill; Frederick W. Barrett; John, Lord Wodehouse; Vivian Lockett	Spain; Leopoldo Saínz de la Maza, 1st Count of la Maza; Jacobo Fitz-James Stuart, 17th Duke of Alba; Hernando Fitz-James Stuart, 14th Duke of Peñaranda; Álvaro de Figueroa, 2nd Marquess of Villabrágima; José de Figueroa y Alonso-Martínez	United States; Arthur Harris; Terry Allen; John Montgomery; Nelson Margetts

== Rowing ==
Event	Gold	Silver	Bronze
Single Sculls	John B. Kelly Sr. (USA)	Jack Beresford (GBR)	Darcy Hadfield (NZL)
Double Sculls	Paul Costello and John B. Kelly Sr. (USA)	Pietro Annoni and Erminio Dones (ITA)	Gaston Giran and Alfred Plé (FRA)
Coxed Pairs	Italy; Ercole Olgeni; Giovanni Scatturin; Guido De Felip	France; Gabriel Poix; Maurice Monney-Bouton; Ernest Barberolle	Switzerland; Édouard Candeveau; Alfred Felber; Paul Piaget
Coxed four	Switzerland; Willy Brüderlin; Max Rudolf; Paul Rudolf; Hans Walter; Paul Staub	United States; Ken Myers; Carl Klose; Franz Federschmidt; Erich Federschmidt; Sherm Clark	Norway; Birger Var; Theodor Klem; Henry Larsen; Per Gulbrandsen; Thoralf Hagen
Eights	United States; Virgil Jacomini; Edwin Graves; William Jordan; Edward Moore; Alden Sanborn; Donald Johnston; Vince Gallagher; Clyde King; Sherm Clark	Great Britain; Ewart Horsfall; Guy Oliver Nickalls; Richard Lucas; Walter James; John Campbell; Sebastian Earl; Ralph Shove; Sidney Swann; Robin Johnstone	Norway; Theodor Nag; Conrad Olsen; Adolf Nilsen; Håkon Ellingsen; Thore Michelsen; Arne Mortensen; Karl Nag; Tollef Tollefsen; Thoralf Hagen

== Rugby union ==
Event	Gold	Silver	Bronze
Rugby union	United States Trainer/Selector: Harry Maloney; Player/Coach: Daniel Carroll; Charles Doe; George Fish; James Fitzpatrick; Joseph Hunter; Morris Kirksey; Charles Mehan; John Muldoon; John O'Neil; John Patrick; Erwin Righter; Rudolph Scholz; Dink Templeton; Charles Lee Tilden (capt); Heaton Wrenn; Harold Von Schmidt (did not play the game): Matthew E. Hazeltine, Sr. Colby Slater; James Winston	France Édouard Bader; François Borde; Adolphe Bousquet; Jean Bruneval; Alphonse Castex; André Chilo; René Crabos; Sélim Curtet; Alfred Eluère; Jacques Forestier; Grenet; Maurice Labeyrie; Robert Levasseur; Pierre Petiteau; Raoul Thiercelin (did not play the game): Raymond Berrurier	none awarded

== Sailing ==
Event	Gold	Silver	Bronze
1920: 12' Dinghy	Netherlands (NED); Cornelis Hin; Johan Hin; Frans Hin	Netherlands (NED); Arnoud van der Biesen; Petrus Beukers	No further competitors
1920: 18' Dinghy	Great Britain (GBR); Francis Richards; Trevor Hedberg	No further competitors	No further competitors
1920: 6.5 Metre	Netherlands (NED); Joop Carp; Berend Carp; Petrus Wernink	France (FRA); Albert Weil; Robert Monier; Félix Picon	No further competitors
1920: 6 Metre; 1907 rule	Belgium (BEL); Emile Cornellie; Frédéric Bruynseels; Florimond Cornellie	Norway (NOR); Einar Torgersen; Leif Erichsen; Andreas Knudsen	Norway (NOR); Henrik Agersborg; Einar Berntsen; Trygve Pedersen
1920: 6 Metre; 1919 rule	Norway (NOR); Andreas Brecke; Paal Kaasen; Ingolf Rød	Belgium (BEL); Léon Huybrechts; Charles van den Bussche; John Klotz	No further competitors
1920: 7 Metre	Great Britain (GBR); Cyril Wright; Robert Coleman; William Maddison; Dorothy Wright	Norway (NOR); Johann Faye; Sten Abel; Christian Dick; Neils Neilsen	No further competitors
1920: 8 Metre; 1907 rule	Norway (NOR); Carl Ringvold; Thorleif Holbye; Alf Jacobsen; Kristoffer Olsen; Tellef Wagle	No further competitors	No further competitors
1920: 8 Metre; 1919 rule	Norway (NOR); Magnus Konow; Thorleif Christoffersen; Reidar Marthiniussen; Ragnar Vik	Norway (NOR); Jens Salvesen; Finn Schiander; Lauritz Schmidt; Nils Thomas; Ralph Tschudi	Belgium (BEL); Albert Grisar; Willy de l'Arbre; Georges Hellebuyck; Léopold Standaert; Henri Weewauters
8.5 Metre	No Entries		
9 Metre	No Entries		
1920: 10 Metre; 1907 rule	Norway (NOR); Erik Herseth; Gunnar Jamvold; Petter Jamvold; Claus Juell; Sigurd Holter; Ingar Nielsen; Ole Sørensen	No further competitors	No further competitors
1920: 10 Metre; 1919 rule	Norway (NOR); Charles Arentz; Otto Falkenberg; Robert Giertsen; Willy Gilbert; Halfdan Schjött; Trygve Schjøtt; Arne Sejersted	No further competitors	No further competitors
1920: 12 Metre; 1907 rule	Norway (NOR); Henrik Østervold; Halvor Birkeland; Rasmus Birkeland; Lauritz Christiansen; Hans Naess; Halvor Mögster; Jan Østervold; Kristian Østervold; Ole Østervold	No further competitors	No further competitors
1920: 12 Metre; 1919 rule	Norway (NOR); Johan Friele; Arthur Allers; Martin Borthen; Kaspar Hassel; Erik Ørvig; Olav Örvig; Thor Ørvig; Egill Reimers; Christen Wiese	No further competitors	No further competitors
1920: 30m2 Skerry cruiser	Sweden (SWE); Gösta Lundqvist; Gösta Bengtsson; Rolf Steffenburg	No further competitors	No further competitors
1920: 40m2 Skerry cruiser	Sweden (SWE); Tore Holm; Yngve Holm; Axel Rydin; Georg Tengwall	Sweden (SWE); Gustaf Svensson; Percy Almstedt; Erik Mellbin; Ragnar Svensson	No further competitors

== Shooting ==
Games	Gold	Silver	Bronze
30 m rapid fire pistol	Guilherme Paraense (BRA)	Raymond Bracken (USA)	Fritz Zulauf (SUI)
Team 30 m military pistol	United States; Karl Frederick; Louis Harant; Michael Kelly; Alfred Lane; James H. Snook	Greece; Georgios Moraitinis; Iason Sappas; Alexandros Theofilakis; Ioannis Theofilakis; Alexandros Vrasivanopoulos	Switzerland; Gustave Amoudruz; Hans Egli; Domenico Giambonini; Joseph Jehle; Fritz Zulauf
50 m free pistol	Karl Frederick (USA)	Afrânio da Costa (BRA)	Alfred Lane (USA)
Team 50 m free pistol	United States; Raymond Bracken; Karl Frederick; Michael Kelly; Alfred Lane; James H. Snook	Sweden; Anders Andersson; Gunnar Gabrielsson; Sigvard Hultcrantz; Anders Johnson; Casimir Reuterskiöld	Brazil; Dario Barbosa; Afrânio da Costa; Guilherme Paraense; Fernando Soledade; Sebastião Wolf
50 m small bore rifle	Lawrence Nuesslein (USA)	Arthur Rothrock (USA)	Dennis Fenton (USA)
Team 50 m small bore rifle	United States; Dennis Fenton; Willis A. Lee; Lawrence Nuesslein; Arthur Rothrock; Oliver Schriver	Sweden; Oscar Eriksson; Sigvard Hultcrantz; Leon Lagerlöf; Erik Ohlsson; Ragnar Stare	Norway; Albert Helgerud; Sigvart Johansen; Anton Olsen; Østen Østensen; Olaf Sletten
300 m free rifle, 3 positions	Morris Fisher (USA)	Niels Larsen (DEN)	Østen Østensen (NOR)
Team free rifle, 3 positions	United States; Dennis Fenton; Morris Fisher; Willis A. Lee; Carl Osburn; Lloyd Spooner	Norway; Albert Helgerud; Otto Olsen; Østen Østensen; Gudbrand Skatteboe; Olaf Sletten	Switzerland; Gustave Amoudruz; Ulrich Fahrner; Fritz Kuchen; Werner Schneeberger; Bernard Siegenthaler
300 m military rifle, prone	Otto Olsen (NOR)	Léon Johnson (FRA)	Fritz Kuchen (SUI)
Team 300 m military rifle, prone	United States; Morris Fisher; Joseph Jackson; Willis A. Lee; Carl Osburn; Lloyd Spooner	France; Léon Johnson; André Parmentier; Achille Paroche; Georges Roes; Émile Rumeau	Finland; Voitto Kolho; Kalle Lappalainen; Veli Nieminen; Vilho Vauhkonen; Magnus Wegelius
300 m military rifle, standing	Carl Osburn (USA)	Lars Jørgen Madsen (DEN)	Lawrence Nuesslein (USA)
Team 300 m military rifle, standing	Denmark; Niels Larsen; Lars Jørgen Madsen; Anders Peter Nielsen; Anders Petersen; Erik Sætter-Lassen	United States; Thomas Brown; Willis A. Lee; Lawrence Nuesslein; Carl Osburn; Lloyd Spooner	Sweden; Olle Ericsson; Mauritz Eriksson; Walfrid Hellman; Hugo Johansson; Leon Lagerlöf
600 m military rifle, prone	Hugo Johansson (SWE)	Mauritz Eriksson (SWE)	Lloyd Spooner (USA)
Team 600 m military rifle, prone	United States; Dennis Fenton; Joseph Jackson; Willis A. Lee; Oliver Schriver; Lloyd Spooner	South Africa; Robert Bodley; Ferdinand Buchanan; George Harvey; Fred Morgan; David Smith	Sweden; Erik Blomqvist; Mauritz Eriksson; Hugo Johansson; Gustaf Adolf Jonsson; Erik Ohlsson
Team 300 + 600 m military rifle, prone	United States; Joseph Jackson; Willis A. Lee; Carl Osburn; Oliver Schriver; Lloyd Spooner	Norway; Albert Helgerud; Otto Olsen; Jacob Onsrud; Østen Østensen; Olaf Sletten	Switzerland; Eugene Addor; Joseph Jehle; Fritz Kuchen; Werner Schneeberger; Weibel
100 m running deer, single shots	Otto Olsen (NOR)	Alfred Swahn (SWE)	Harald Natvig (NOR)
Team 100 m running deer, single shots	Norway; Einar Liberg; Ole Lilloe-Olsen; Harald Natvig; Hans Nordvik; Otto Olsen	Finland; Yrjö Kolho; Kalle Lappalainen; Toivo Tikkanen; Nestori Toivonen; Magnus Wegelius	United States; Thomas Brown; Willis A. Lee; Lawrence Nuesslein; Carl Osburn; Lloyd Spooner
100 m running deer, double shots	Ole Lilloe-Olsen (NOR)	Fredric Landelius (SWE)	Einar Liberg (NOR)
Team 100 m running deer, double shots	Norway; Thorstein Johansen; Einar Liberg; Ole Lilloe-Olsen; Harald Natvig; Hans Nordvik	Sweden; Edward Benedicks; Bengt Lagercrantz; Fredric Landelius; Alfred Swahn; Oscar Swahn	Finland; Yrjö Kolho; Toivo Tikkanen; Nestori Toivonen; Vilho Vauhkonen; Magnus Wegelius
Trap	Mark Arie (USA)	Frank Troeh (USA)	Frank Wright (USA)
Team trap	United States; Mark Arie; Horace Bonser; Jay Clark; Forest McNeir; Frank Troeh; Frank Wright	Belgium; Albert Bosquet; Joseph Cogels; Émile Dupont; Edouard Fesinger; Henri Quersin; Louis Van Tilt	Sweden; Per Kinde; Fredric Landelius; Erik Lundquist; Karl Richter; Erik Sökjer-Petersén; Alfred Swahn

== Swimming ==
=== Men's events ===
Games	Gold	Silver	Bronze
100 m freestyle	Duke Kahanamoku; United States	Pua Kealoha; United States	Bill Harris; United States
400 m freestyle	Norman Ross; United States	Ludy Langer; United States	George Vernot; Canada
1500 m freestyle	Norman Ross; United States	George Vernot; Canada	Frank Beaurepaire; Australia
100 m backstroke	Warren Kealoha; United States	Ray Kegeris; United States	Gérard Blitz; Belgium
200 m breaststroke	Håkan Malmrot; Sweden	Thor Henning; Sweden	Arvo Aaltonen; Finland
400 m breaststroke	Håkan Malmrot; Sweden	Thor Henning; Sweden	Arvo Aaltonen; Finland
4 × 200 m freestyle relay	United States; Duke Kahanamoku; Pua Kealoha; Perry McGillivray; Norman Ross	Australia; Frank Beaurepaire; Henry Hay; William Herald; Ivan Stedman	Great Britain; Harold Annison; Edward Peter; Leslie Savage; Henry Taylor

=== Women's events ===
Games	Gold	Silver	Bronze
100 m freestyle	Ethelda Bleibtrey; United States	Irene Guest; United States	Frances Schroth; United States
300 m freestyle	Ethelda Bleibtrey; United States	Margaret Woodbridge; United States	Frances Schroth; United States
4 × 100 m freestyle relay	United States; Ethelda Bleibtrey; Irene Guest; Frances Schroth; Margaret Woodbridge	Great Britain; Hilda James; Constance Jeans; Grace McKenzie; Charlotte Radcliffe	Sweden; Aina Berg; Jane Gylling; Emily Machnow; Carin Nilsson

== Tennis ==
Games	Gold	Silver	Bronze
Men's singles	Louis Raymond; South Africa	Ichiya Kumagae; Japan	Charles Winslow; South Africa
Men's doubles	Great Britain; Noel Turnbull; Max Woosnam	Japan; Seiichiro Kashio; Ichiya Kumagae	France; Pierre Albarran; Max Decugis
Women's singles	Suzanne Lenglen; France	Dorothy Holman; Great Britain	Kathleen McKane; Great Britain
Women's doubles	Great Britain; Kathleen McKane; Winifred McNair	Great Britain; Winifred Beamish; Dorothy Holman	France; Élisabeth d'Ayen; Suzanne Lenglen
Mixed doubles	France; Suzanne Lenglen; Max Decugis	Great Britain; Kathleen McKane; Max Woosnam	Czechoslovakia; Milada Skrbková; Ladislav Žemla

== Tug of war ==
Gold	Silver	Bronze
Great Britain; George Canning; Frederick Humphreys; Frederick Holmes; Edwin Mills; John Sewell; John James Shepherd; Harry Stiff; Ernest Thorn	Netherlands; Wilhelmus Bekkers; Johannes Hengeveld; Sijtse Jansma; Henk Janssen; Antonius van Loon; Willem van Loon; Marinus van Rekum; Willem van Rekum	Belgium; Édouard Bourguignon; Alphonse Ducatillon; Rémy Maertens; Christin Piek; Henri Pintens; Charles Van den Broeck; François Van Hoorenbeek; Gustave Wuyts

== Water polo ==
Gold	Silver	Bronze
Great Britain; Charles Sydney Smith; Paul Radmilovic; Charles Bugbee; Noel Purcell; Christopher Jones; William Peacock; William Henry Dean	Belgium; Albert Durant; Gérard Blitz; Maurice Blitz; Joseph Pletinckx; Paul Gailly; Pierre Nijs; René Bauwens; Pierre Dewin	Sweden; Harald Julin; Robert Andersson; Vilhelm Andersson; Erik Bergqvist; Max Gumpel; Pontus Hanson; Erik Andersson; Nils Backlund; Theodor Nauman; Torsten Kumfeldt (Note: This competitor is missing from the IOC medal database but is shown by Wudarski/de Wael/Mallon/Kamper. He probably played two matches.)

== Weightlifting ==
Games	Gold	Silver	Bronze
Featherweight –60 kg	Frans De Haes; Belgium	Alfred Schmidt; Estonia	Eugène Ryter; Switzerland
Lightweight –67.5 kg	Alfred Neuland; Estonia	Louis Williquet; Belgium	Florimond Rooms; Belgium
Middleweight –75 kg	Henri Gance; France	Pietro Bianchi; Italy	Albert Pettersson; Sweden
Light-heavyweight –82.5 kg	Ernest Cadine; France	Fritz Hünenberger; Switzerland	Erik Pettersson; Sweden
Heavyweight +82.5 kg	Filippo Bottino; Italy	Joseph Alzin; Luxembourg	Louis Bernot; France

== Wrestling ==
=== Greco-Roman ===
Games	Gold	Silver	Bronze
Featherweight	Oskari Friman; Finland	Heikki Kähkönen; Finland	Fritiof Svensson; Sweden
Lightweight	Emil Väre; Finland	Taavi Tamminen; Finland	Frithjof Andersen; Norway
Middleweight	Carl Westergren; Sweden	Arthur Lindfors; Finland	Masa Perttilä; Finland
Light heavyweight	Claes Johanson; Sweden	Edil Rosenqvist; Finland	Johannes Eriksen; Denmark
Heavyweight	Adolf Lindfors; Finland	Poul Hansen; Denmark	Martti Nieminen; Finland

=== Freestyle ===
Games	Gold	Silver	Bronze
Featherweight	Charles Ackerly; United States	Sam Gerson; United States	Bernard Bernard; Great Britain
Lightweight	Kalle Anttila; Finland	Gottfrid Svensson; Sweden	Herbert Wright; Great Britain
Middleweight	Eino Leino; Finland	Väinö Penttala; Finland	Charley Johnson; United States
Light heavyweight	Anders Larsson; Sweden	Charles Courant; Switzerland	Walter Maurer; United States
Heavyweight	Robert Roth; Switzerland	Nat Pendleton; United States	Fred Meyer; United States
Heavyweight	Robert Roth; Switzerland	Nat Pendleton; United States	Ernst Nilsson; Sweden

== See also ==
- 1920 Summer Olympics medal table
