= Huster =

Huster is a surname. Notable people with the surname include:

- Francis Huster (born 1947), French actor, director, and scriptwriter
- Marc Huster (born 1970), German weightlifter and sports commentator

== See also ==
- Hester
- Huste
- Husted
