= List of Olympic medalists in hockey =

List of Olympic medalists in hockey may refer to:

- List of Olympic medalists in field hockey
- List of Olympic medalists in ice hockey
