= Strauwen =

Strauwen is a Belgian surname. Notable individuals with this surname include:

- Louis Strauwen, Belgian rower
- Pierre Strauwen (1886–1968), Belgian Olympic swimmer
- René Strauwen (1901–1960), Belgian field hockey player
