= Bierrum =

British civil engineering and construction company

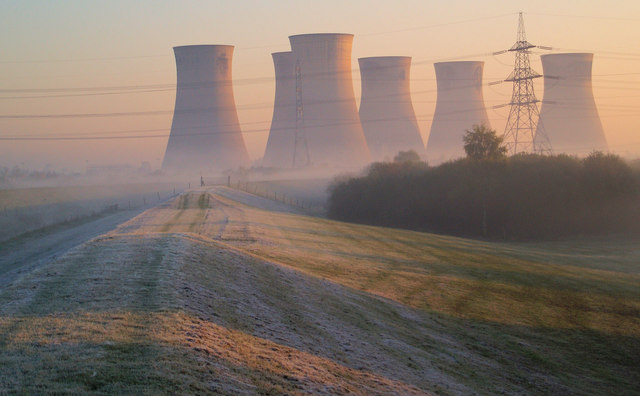
The former Thorpe Marsh Power Station in October 2007

Bierrum is a British civil engineering and construction company. It was responsible for constructing the majority of Britain's concrete cooling towers at the country's power stations since 1965.

Established by the Danish civil engineer Hans Bjerrum on 26 September 1927 to undertake its first contract at Shoreham Power Station, the company specialised in large concrete structures, especially those that involved working at great heights. It constructed numerous water towers, cement works, and chimneys; perhaps its most high-profile works were the 850 ft chimney of Grain Power Station, the tallest freestanding structure in South East England, and Spinnaker Tower in Portsmouth. During the 1991, Bierrum acquired its former competitor Pendrich, expanding the firm's footprint in the steeplejack sector. It also implemented several new safety-enhancing practices for working on tall chimneys throughout the 1990s and 2000s. However, in September 2003, the firm became insolvent and entered receivership. During the following year, many of its assets were purchased by a group of ex-employees, who established Bierrum International as its successor. This company continued to undertake similar work to its predecessor. During 2019, the company was rebranded as Dominion Bierrum.

== History ==
Bierrum was founded by Hans Bierrum (or Hans Bjerrum), a Danish civil engineer that was born in Hellerup and had competed in the 1920 Summer Olympics in Belgium. Upon its establishment on 26 September 1927, the company was based at Victoria Street in London. Its first contract was at the former Shoreham Power Station; the first cooling tower was built in 1931. Bierrum relocated to Harrow, and subsequently to Sudbury Hill. On 30 April 1938, the business was incorporated as Bierrum and Partners Ltd.

Hans Bjerrum died in 1979. Five years earlier, Hans' son, Roger, had been appointed as chairman of Bierrum. During 1991, the company acquired rival firm Pendrich out of receivership, rescuing 30 jobs in the process.

Throughout the 1990s and early 2000s, Bierrum introduced numerous means of bolstering personal safety while working at heights, including the Spider platform, while undertaking projects such as the demolition of tall chimneys.

In September 2003, Bierrum was rendered insolvent after its fiscal circumstances had been negatively impacted by multiple factors, including a downturn in the power sector, legal action, and difficulties related to a project in Turkey. Within six months, a group of former engineers at the company led by Gary Eastman and Bob Sutton, had established a successor company, Bierrum International, after acquiring the name and selected assets from the receiver PricewaterhouseCoopers via a German-backed buyout. It became part of Beroa Technology Group GmbH (BTG) of Ratingen-Lintorf, North Rhine-Westphalia, Germany.

In 2019, Bierrum International was rebranded as Dominion Bierrum; it has been owned by Global Dominion Access of Bilbao since 2014, which was in turn owned by CIE Automotive.

== Structure ==
From January 1957, the company was headquartered at 167 Imperial Drive in Rayners Lane, an office building which it built for its own use. The company depot was at Smallford in Hertfordshire.

In 1981, Bierrum was based at Barwythe Hall at Studham near Dunstable.

It is headquartered in Central Bedfordshire, around one mile east of the M1, close to the Greensand Ridge Walk.

== Projects ==
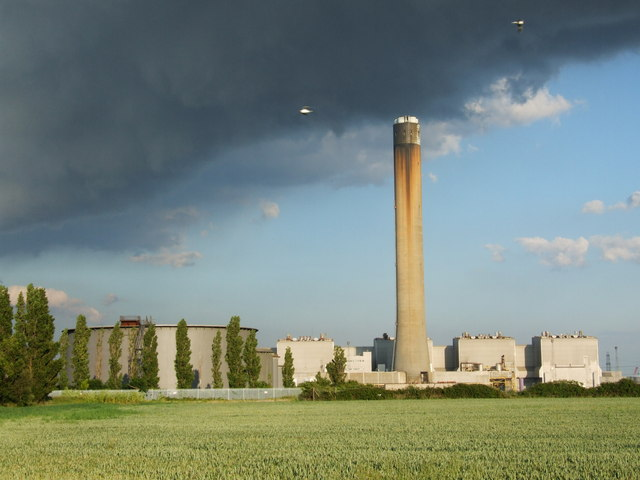
Grain Power Station, 2009

Bierrum has designed and built cooling towers (køletårn in Danish) and chimneys nationally and internationally. The firm demolishes chimneys incrementally using its Bierrum Rig.

Bierrum also built cement works, such as Ketton Cement Works in 1961, water towers, such as at North Walsham in 1954, and oil refinery chimneys.

- In 1972, the firm built the 850 ft chimney of Grain Power Station, the tallest freestanding structure in South East England, completed in March 1975, requiring 38,100 tonnes of reinforcing steel and concrete.
- Spinnaker Tower in Portsmouth, built by slip forming and climbing formwork (jumpform); the company ran out of money during construction in September 2003.
- In 2016, it removed and rebuilt the iconic four chimneys of Battersea Power Station, in conjunction with contractor Skanska, and consultant engineer Buro Happold

== Incidents ==
- On the afternoon of Saturday 16 November 1958, 34 year old Edward Charles Burgess, of Goldenhill Rd in Fenton, fell 60 ft at Drakelow Power Station, and died on the morning of Sunday 17 November at Burton General Hospital
- When building the Associated Portland Cement works at Westbury, Wiltshire in 1962, 22 year old steel erector, Winston Toms, fell 85 ft to his death
- In April 1968, 55 year old Roman Mitchell, of Windsmoor St in Stoke, fell 40 ft to his death on the Rugeley B Power Station cooling tower number 8

== See also ==
- J. L. Eve Construction, built other UK electricity transmission infrastructure
- Denmark–United Kingdom relations
- Arup Group
- Institute of Demolition Engineers, based in Kent
- Category:Construction and civil engineering companies of Denmark
