= Husted =

Husted is a surname. Notable people with the surname include:

- Bill Husted (1866–1941), American baseball player
- Dave Husted (born 1960), American ten-pin bowler
- Erik Husted (1900–1988), Danish field hockey player
- Ida Husted Harper (1851–1931), American suffragist, journalist, author
- James Husted (disambiguation), multiple people
- Jon Husted (born 1967), American politician
- Marjorie Husted (1892–1986), American home economist
- Michael Husted (born 1970), American football player
- Otto Husted (1902–1980), Danish field hockey player
- Per Husted (born 1966), Danish politician
