= Huste =

Huste is a surname. Notable people with the surname include:

- Annemarie Huste (1943–2016), German-American chef and cookbook writer
- Falk Huste (born 1971), German boxer
- Kay Huste (born 1974), German boxer

== See also ==
- Husted
- Huster
