= Anthony Wilkinson =

English cricketer and barrister

Personal information
- Full name: Anthony John Anstruther Wilkinson
- Born: 28 May 1835; Durham, County Durham, England
- Died: 11 December 1905 (aged 70); Anerley, Kent, England
- Batting: Right-handed
- Bowling: Right-arm roundarm slow
- Relatives: Cyril Wilkinson (son)

Domestic team information
- Years: Team
- 1864–1874: Middlesex
- 1865–1868: Yorkshire
- 1867–1871: Marylebone Cricket Club

Career statistics
Competition	First-class
Matches	61
Runs scored	1,351
Batting average	13.64
100s/50s	–/5
Top score	84*
Balls bowled	2,799
Wickets	53
Bowling average	22.62
5 wickets in innings	2
10 wickets in match	–
Best bowling	6/52
Catches/stumpings	43/–
- Source: ESPNcricinfo, 16 June 2022

Anthony John Anstruther Wilkinson (28 May 1835 – 11 December 1905) was an English barrister and amateur first-class cricketer.

Wilkinson was born in Mount Oswald, County Durham, England, the 4th son of the Rev. Percival Spearman and Sophia Mary Anstruther. He was educated at Shrewsbury School and St John's College, Cambridge, gaining a B.A. in 1859. Admitted to Lincoln's Inn in 1858, he was called to the Bar in 1861.

Wilkinson played sixty one first-class matches between 1862 and 1874. He played nineteen times for Middlesex County Cricket Club (1864–1874), five for Yorkshire (1865–1868), the Marylebone Cricket Club (MCC) (1867–1871), Gentlemen of the South (1862–1864), Surrey Club (1865–1866), Gentlemen (1865), Gentlemen of Middlesex (1865), Southgate (1866–1868), North of the Thames (1867), Gentlemen of England (1869–1874) and Gentlemen of Marylebone Cricket Club (1870). He also appeared in non first-class cricket for Surrey Club and Ground in 1862.

A right-handed batsman, Wilkinson scored 1,351 runs at an average of 13.64, with a highest score of 84 not out against Gentlemen of England. He took 53 wickets, bowling right arm round arm slow, at 22.62 with a best of 6 for 52 against the MCC. He took 43 catches in the field. A good all-rounder, he scored runs in a prolific manner in club cricket and took many wickets. He was chairman of the meeting when Durham County Cricket Club was founded in 1874.

A barrister who practised on the North-Eastern Circuit, he became Conveyancing Counsel to the Court of Chancery of the County Palatine of Durham in 1882. In 1877, he married Marion Harriet Jones, eldest daughter of the Rev. Francis Jones, vicar of Moreton Pinkney. A son, Cyril Wilkinson, captained Surrey from 1914 to 1920, playing over fifty matches and captained Surrey to the County Championship title in 1914.

Wilkinson died in Anerley, Kent, England in December 1905, aged 70.
