= Robert Lelong =

French hockey player

Personal information
- Nationality: French

Sport
- Sport: Field hockey

Robert Lelong was a French field hockey player. He competed in the men's tournament at the 1920 Summer Olympics.
