= George Bennett (cricketer, born 1883) =

English cricketer, British Army officer, and solicitor

Personal information
- Full name: George Guy Marsland Bennett
- Born: 22 April 1883; Chorlton-on-Medlock, Lancashire, England
- Died: 6 February 1966 (aged 82); Sunningdale, Berkshire, England
- Batting: Right-handed
- Bowling: Unknown
- Relatives: John Bennett (brother)

Domestic team information
- Years: Team
- 1902–1927: Berkshire
- 1903–1905: Oxford University

Career statistics
Competition	First-class
Matches	8
Runs scored	380
Batting average	23.75
100s/50s	1/1
Top score	131
Balls bowled	66
Wickets	2
Bowling average	24.50
5 wickets in innings	–
10 wickets in match	–
Best bowling	1/20
Catches/stumpings	6/–
- Source: Cricinfo, 12 February 2019

George Guy Marsland Bennett (22 April 1883 – 6 February 1966) MC was an English first-class cricketer, British Army officer and solicitor. He played first-class cricket for Oxford University from 1903 to 1905, before serving in the First World War with both the Royal Irish Rifles and the Machine Gun Corps, during the course of which he was awarded the Military Cross. His brother was the Olympian John Bennett.

== Early life and cricket ==
Bennett was born at Chorlton-on-Medlock near Manchester. He was educated at Bilton Grange prep school in Warwickshire, before attending Harrow School. He took part in several sporting activities while at Harrow, including playing the football XI in 1901 and the cricket XI in 1902, as well as also being the gym champion in 1902. He left Harrow in 1902 and went up to Magdalen College, Oxford. During this final year at Harrow, Bennett debuted in minor counties cricket for Berkshire against Buckinghamshire in the Minor Counties Championship. He made his debut in first-class cricket during his first year at Magdalen College for Oxford University against the Marylebone Cricket Club at Lord's. He made two further appearances in 1904, against the touring South Africans and Worcestershire (against whom he scored 131, in the process making his only first-class century), before making five further appearances in 1905. Across eight first-class matches for Oxford, Bennett scored 380 runs at an average of 23.75, while also taking 2 wickets. He did not however gain a blue. He graduated from Magdalen College in 1906, with Bennett employed as a solicitor by 1910. Prior to the First World War, Bennett continued to make regular appearances for Berkshire in minor counties cricket.

== World War I service and later life ==
Bennett enlisted in the British Army on 29 September 1914, and served during World War I with the Royal Irish Rifles as a second lieutenant in April 1915. He was promoted to the rank of lieutenant in January 1916, and in that same month he was seconded for duty with the Machine Gun Corps in January 1916. By March 1917, he has been made an acting captain, a rank he relinquished when he ceased to command a depot company. In March 1918, he was made an acting major, a rank he relinquished the following march when he ceased to control a company. Bennett was awarded the Military Cross in June 1919. He was again made an acting major in June 1919.

Following the war, Bennett resumed playing minor counties cricket for Berkshire, an association he would keep until 1927, having made a total of 112 appearances in the Minor Counties Championship. He was recalled to military service during World War II, serving in the Royal Artillery. He also served as the secretary of the Sandy Lodge Golf Club. He died at Sunningdale, Berkshire in February 1966.
