= Paul Haranger =

French hockey player

Personal information
- Nationality: French
- Born: 22 July 1893 Paris, France
- Died: 27 December 1973 (aged 80) Avignon, France

Sport
- Sport: Field hockey

Paul Albert Félix Haranger (22 July 1893 – 27 December 1973) was a French field hockey player. He competed in the men's tournament at the 1920 Summer Olympics.
