= Khursheed Aslam =

Pakistani field hockey player (1936–1993)

Personal information
- Born: Bhopal
Medal record
Men's field hockey
Representing Pakistan
Olympic Games
Gold medal – first place	1960 Rome	Team
Asian Games
Gold medal – first place	1958 Tokyo	Team competition

Khursheed Aslam (6 April 1936 – 1993) was a field hockey player from Pakistan. He was a member of the Pakistan hockey team at the 1960 Summer Olympics, that won the country's first Olympic gold medal by defeating India in the final of the men's hockey competition.
