= James Husted =

James Husted may refer to:

- James W. Husted (speaker) (1833–1892), American lawyer and legislator; Speaker in New York State Assembly
- James W. Husted (Representative) (1870–1925), U.S. Representative from New York, 1915–1923
