= Paul Dearing =

Australian field hockey player

Personal information
- Full name: Paul Robert Dearing
- Born: 2 March 1942 Hamilton, New South Wales, Australia
- Died: 6 April 2015 (aged 73) Eleebana, New South Wales, Australia

Sport
- Sport: Field hockey
Medal record
Men's field hockey
Representing Australia
Olympic Games
Silver medal – second place	1968 Mexico City	Team competition
Bronze medal – third place	1964 Tokyo	Team competition

Paul Robert Dearing (2 March 1942 – 6 April 2015) was a field hockey player from Australia, who won the silver medal with the Men's National Team at the 1968 Summer Olympics in Mexico City. Four years earlier he captured the bronze medal. He was born in Hamilton, New South Wales, Australia.
