= Mushtaq Ahmed (field hockey, born 1932) =

Pakistani field hockey player (1932–2011)

Personal information
- Born: 28 August 1932 Amritsar, Punjab Provine, British India
- Died: 23 April 2011 (aged 78) London, Greater London, England
- Height: 173 cm (5 ft 8 in)
- Weight: 61 kg

Sport
- Sport: Field hockey
Medal record
Representing Pakistan
Olympic Games
Gold medal – first place	1960 Rome	Team

Mushtaq Ahmed (28 August 1932 – 23 April 2011) was a field hockey striker from Pakistan. He was born in Amritsar, India. He was part of the gold-winning Pakistani national team at the 1960 Summer Olympics, where the hockey team won the nation's first Olympic gold. He scored against Australia in the first match of the Games. After the Olympics he was granted a transferral along with his family to move to the United Kingdom. He died in London, England aged 82 on 23 April 2011.

== See also ==
- Mushtaq Ahmad (field hockey, born 1956)
