= Shoreham Power Station =

Gas-fired power station

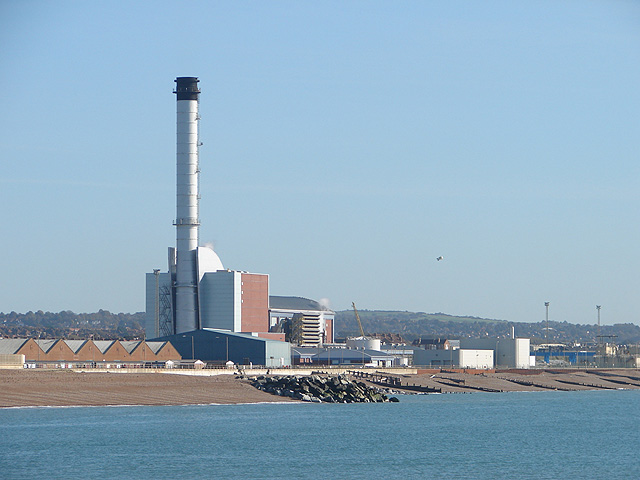
- Shoreham Power Station pictured in 2008
- Country: England
- Location: Southwick, West Sussex
- Coordinates: 50°49′46″N 0°13′50″W
- Status: Operational
- Construction cost: £150 million
- Operator: VPI
- Chimneys: 1 (106 m (348 ft))

Power generation
- Nameplate capacity: 420 MW

External links
- Commons: Related media on Commons

Shoreham Power Station is a 420MWe combined cycle gas-fired power station in Southwick, West Sussex. It was built on the site of the Shoreham B Power Station.

== History ==
=== Gloucester Road Power Station ===
Brighton was one of the first towns in the UK to have a continuous supply of electricity. In 1882, Robert Hammond established the Hammond Electric Light Company and, on the 27 February 1882, he opened the Gloucester Road Power Station. It was set up in the yard of Reed's Iron Foundry, and consisted of a Brush dynamo, driven by a Robey engine. This was used to power sixteen arc lamps on a 1.75 mi (2.82 km) circuit around the town centre, operating from dusk until 11pm every day. In spring 1883, another dynamo was brought into operation, powered by a Marshall engine, powering a 40 lamp circuit.

In 1885, the Hammond Electric Light Company went into voluntary liquidation, and the system was bought by the Brighton Electric Light Company who registered on 16 December 1885. It further extended the system, building a new station on the same site, consisting of three 40-lamp Brush dynamos, powered by a Fowler engine. This station was later extended by another two Brush dynamos and another Fowler engine.

By January 1886, the company's system had increased to include 1,000 filament lamps on 8 mi (13 km) of circuit, and in 1887, it was decided for the company to provide a day time service. A 16-lamp dynamo and a Hornsby engine were installed to take the day-time load. In the same year, the system was switched from DC to AC, and electricity was generated at 1,800 volts (V) using single-phase Elwell Parker and Mordey alternators. Voltage was reduced to 100 V by Lowrie-Hall transformers mounted on customers' rooftops. By 1887, 34 arc lamps and 1,500 filament lamps were being supplied by five Brush dynamos, on a 15 mi (24 km) system of overhead lines. In 1890 the company became the Brighton and Hove Electric Light Company.

=== North Road Power Station ===
The local authority, the Brighton Corporation, had obtained a provisional order allowing them to generate electricity in 1883, but had never the need to exercise it. However, in 1890, it acquired the site for a power station and opened its own municipal North Road Power Station on 14 September 1891. It supplied at 115 V DC, using four Willans-Goolden generating sets, two at 45 kilowatts (kW) and two at 120 kW, provided with steam by three Lancashire boilers. Another two Willans engines driving 240 kW dynamos were added later. In 1894, the Brighton Corporation bought out the Brighton and Hove Electric Light Company.

By 1904, the North Road station's capacity was at 5,935 kW, with six Lancashire boilers and ten Babcock & Wilcox boilers, steaming nineteen Willans engines, coupled directly to DC generators. It was decided a larger station would be needed, and the site was chosen at Southwick. When this station was opened in 1906, the old station became less required. As such, in 1908, North Road station was closed down.

=== Shoreham A Power Station ===
The construction on the Southwick power station commenced in 1904, its site chosen because of its position on the harbour, meaning plentiful supply of water for cooling, and access to seaborne coal. The first phase of the station opened in June 1906, with a generating capacity of 5,470 kW. A 15,000 kW turbo alternator was installed in 1931 in place of a former 2,500 kW set. A 30,000 kW set in 1933 the latter powered by three new tridrum 150,000 Ib. per hour Stirling boilers. The station was given various modifications and extensions, and by 1946 it had a capacity of 190 megawatts (MW).

In 1937, the first of two 37,500kW Brush-Ljungstrom turbo alternators was commissioned the 2nd one following in 1939.

By 1961, the station had an installed capacity of 190 MW, comprising 1 × 30 MW, 2 × 37.5 MW and 1 × 50 MW turbo-alternators. The turbines were supplied with steam from 10 boilers: 4 × 160,000 lb/hr (20.2 kg/s), 4 × 215,000 lb/hr (27.1 kg/s) and 2 × 350,000 lb/hr (44.1 kg/s). The boilers were chain grate, pulverised coal and retort stoker designs. The total steam output was 2,200,000 lb/hr (277.2 kg/s) and the steam conditions at the turbine stop valves were 350/650 psi (24.1/44.8 bar) and 399/454 °C. Seawater was used for condensing and cooling.

Output, in GWh, of the A station over the period 1961–75

The A station was closed on 15 March 1976 with a generating capacity of 53 MW.

=== Shoreham B Power Station ===
In the early 1940s, it became clear that a large power station was going to be needed to provide electricity for the south east area. The Southwick site was selected by the national power board, the Central Electricity Board. In 1946, Brighton Corporation was ordered to proceed with the construction of the new station, consisting of six 52.5 MW generating sets. The first pile was driven on 25 November 1947. During the construction of the station, on 1 April 1948, the electric supply industry in the United Kingdom was nationalised, and the British Electricity Authority took over responsibility of the site from Brighton Corporation. On 26 June 1950, consent was given for the second section of the station, but it was decided that the last two generating sets would have a capacity of 60 MW, and sets 1 to 4 uprated to 55.5 MW. The station's six units were commissioned from December 1952 to September 1958, and the station had a total generating capacity of 342 MW. The chimneys were 350-feet high with a 32-feet internal diameter at the base, reducing to 24-feet internal diameter at the top. The demolition of one of its chimneys was featured in a 2009 advert for EDF Energy.

By 1961, the station had an installed capacity of 342 MW, comprising 4 × 55.5 MW and 2 × 60 MW turbo-alternators. The 55.5 MW machines were decommissioned in 1975. The turbines were supplied with steam from 11 pulverised coal boilers each with a capacity of 320,000 lb/hr (40.3 kg/s) giving a total steam output of 3,520,000 lb/hr (443.5 kg/s). The steam conditions at the turbine stop valves were 900 psi (62.1 bar) and 482 °C. Seawater was used for condensing and cooling. Electrically, Generators 1 - 4 fed into the 132kV network at Fishersgate 132kV Substation. Generators 5 - 6 fed in to the local 33kV network. The B Station site supplies were fed from four individual 33kV supply cables from the A Station 33kV board.

Output, in GWh, for the B station over the period 1961–84

== Shoreham Power Station ==
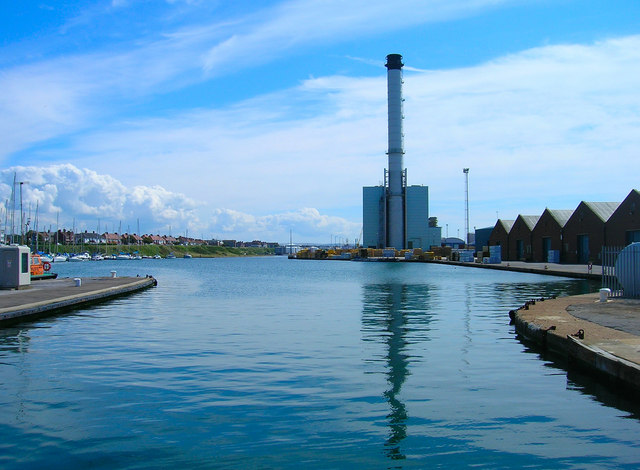

The gas-fired station is built on the site of the B station, and named after nearby Shoreham-by-Sea.

It was constructed by Alstom and Mott MacDonald, and opened in the summer of 2000 costing £150m. It was originally owned by South Coast Power Ltd, a consortium of Scottish Power and SEEBOARD (owned by Central and South West Corporation). It was owned and operated by Drax Generation Enterprise Ltd, before being sold in February 2021 to Vitol (VPI Holdings Ltd)

It is a 420 megawatt (MW) CCGT-type power that runs on natural gas. There is one Alstom gas turbine from which the exhaust gases heat an Stork heat recovery steam generator which drives an ABB steam turbine, in a single-shaft configuration. Warm waste water is released into the sea. The chimney is 106 m (348 ft) tall and is the tallest structure in West Sussex; it was the tallest in all of Sussex before the construction of the Brighton i360. The Monarch's Way footpath passes the station which backs on to Southwick Beach.
