= Field hockey at the 1920 Summer Olympics =

Field hockey at the Games of the VII Olympiad
- Venue: Olympic Stadium
- Dates: 1–5 September 1920
- Teams: 4

Medalists
1st place, gold medalist(s)		Great Britain
2nd place, silver medalist(s)		Denmark
3rd place, bronze medalist(s)		Belgium

The field hockey competition at the 1920 Summer Olympics was held between September 1–5, 1920 in Antwerp, Belgium. Only four teams took part in the tournament and Great Britain won the gold medal.

== Results ==
=== Standings ===
Pos	Team	Pld	W	D	L	GF	GA	GD	Pts
1st place, gold medalist(s)	Great Britain	3	3	0	0	17	2	+15	6
2nd place, silver medalist(s)	Denmark	3	2	0	1	15	8	+7	4
3rd place, bronze medalist(s)	Belgium (H)	3	1	0	2	6	19	−13	2
4	France	3	0	0	3	3	12	−9	0

Source: Sports Reference
(H) Hosts

=== Matches ===
1 September 1920
15:30

Great Britain	5–1	Denmark
Shoveller 10', ?', ?'; McGrath ?'; Rasmussen ?'	Report	Blach ?'

Umpires:
Thomas Burman (GBR)
Hans Kjær (DEN)

1 September 1920
17:30

Belgium	3–2	France
Becquet 27', ?'; Valcke ?'	Report	Bedel 7'; Guard ?'

Umpires:
Thomas Burman (GBR)
Rodolphe Seeldrayers (BEL)

3 September 1920
15:30

Great Britain	12–1	Belgium
Shoveller 2', ?', ?', ?', ?', ?'; MacBryan ?', ?'; Leighton 20'; Marcon ?', ?', ?'	Report	? 6'

Umpires:
Thomas Burman (GBR)
Verhoustraeten (BEL)

3 September 1920
17:30

Denmark	9–1	France
Blach 16', 21', 45', ?', ?'; Due ?'; Bjerrum ?', ?'; Holst ?'	Report	Bounal ?'

Umpires:
Hans Kjær (DEN)
George McGrath (GBR)

4 September 1920
15:00

Great Britain	W.O.	France
	Report

5 September 1920
15:30

Denmark	5–2	Belgium
Blach ?', ?', ?'; Holst ?'; Eigenbrod ?'	Report	? ?' ? ?'

== Medalists ==
Gold	Silver	Bronze
Great Britain; Charles Atkin; John Bennett; Colin Campbell; Harold Cassels; Harold Cooke; Eric Crockford; Reginald Crummack; Harry Haslam; Arthur Leighton; Charles Marcon; John MacBryan; George McGrath; Stanley Shoveller; William Smith; Cyril Wilkinson	Denmark; Hans Bjerrum; Ejvind Blach; Niels Blach; Steen Due; Thorvald Eigenbrod; Frands Faber; Hans Jørgen Hansen Hans Herlak; Henning Holst; Erik Husted; Paul Metz; Andreas Rasmussen	Belgium; André Becquet; Pierre Chibert; Raoul Daufresne de la Chevalerie; Fernand de Montigny; Charles Delelienne; Louis Diercxsens; Robert Gevers; Adolphe Goemaere; Charles Gniette; Raymond Keppens; René Strauwen; Pierre Valcke; Maurice van den Bemden; Jean van Nerom

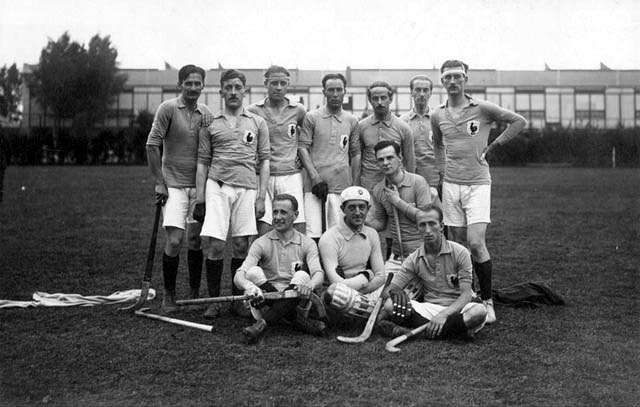
French team, 4th

The following players represented the French squad, who finished in fourth place:

- Paul Haranger
- Robert Lelong
- Pierre Estrabant
- Georges Breuille
- Jacques Morise
- Edmond Loriol
- Désiré Guard
- Roland Bedel
- André Bounal
- Gaston Rogot
- Pierre Rollin
