= Otto Husted =

Danish field hockey player

Otto Husted (October 10, 1902 – March 31, 1980) was a Danish field hockey player who competed in the 1928 Summer Olympics.

He was born in Helsingør and died in Virum. He was the younger brother of Erik Husted.

In 1928 he was a member of the Danish team which was eliminated in the first round of the Olympic tournament after two wins and two losses. He played three matches as halfback.
