= Mushtaq Ahmad (field hockey, born 1956) =

Pakistani field hockey player (born 1956)

Personal information
- Born: 15 February 1956 (age 70)
Medal record
Men's field hockey
Representing Pakistan
Olympic Games
| Gold medal – first place | 1984 Los Angeles | Team |

Mushtaq Ahmad (born 15 February 1956) is a former field hockey forward from Pakistan. He won the gold medal in 1984 Summer Olympics.

== See also ==
- Mushtaq Ahmad (field hockey, born 1932)
