= John Bennett (field hockey) =

English field hockey player and cricketer

Personal information
- Born: 11 August 1885 Chorlton-cum-Hardy, Manchester, England
- Died: 27 May 1973 (aged 87) Littleham, Devon, England

Sport
- Sport: Field hockey
- Position: Right-back
Senior career
Years	Team	Caps	Goals
1908–1924	Hampstead & Westminster	-	-
National team
Years	Team	Caps	Goals
–	England	34	-
–	GB		-
Medal record
Men's field hockey
Gold medal – first place	1920 Antwerp	Team competition

John Hadfield Bennett (11 August 1885 – 25 May 1973) was an English field hockey player from Chorlton-cum-Hardy, Lancashire, who competed in the 1920 Summer Olympics.He was a member of the British field hockey team, which won the gold medal.

== Biography ==
Bennett was educated at Harrow School and studied at Magdalen College, Oxford He won his blue in 1907 and 1908 and after leaving Oxford, played club hockey for Hampstead and Westminster Hockey Club.

In 1911, Bennett was called to the bar at Inner Temple and also made his England debut. His career was interrupted by World War I and was wounded while serving with the Royal Warwickshire Regiment.

Bennett also played cricket for Berkshire in the Minor Counties Championship from 1906 to 1908. His brother George played cricket at first-class level.
