= Pierre Chibert =

Belgian field hockey player (1879–1953)

Olympic medal record

Men's field hockey

Representing Belgium
Bronze medal – third place	1920 Antwerp	Team competition

Pierre Chibert (16 November 1879 – 27 January 1953) was a Belgian field hockey player who competed in the 1920 Summer Olympics. He was a member of the Belgian field hockey team, which won the bronze medal.
