= William Smith (field hockey) =

English field hockey player

Personal information
- Born: 14 November 1886 Carlisle, England
- Died: 3 March 1937 (aged 50) Marylebone, England

Sport
- Sport: Field hockey
- Position: Outside-right
Senior career
Years	Team	Caps	Goals
1909–1913	Blackheath	-	-
1920–1923	Beckenham	-	-
National team
Years	Team	Caps	Goals
1911–1921	England & GB	26	-
Medal record
Men's field hockey
Gold medal – first place	1920 Antwerp	Team competition

William Faulder Smith (14 November 1886 – 3 March 1937) was an English field hockey player from Carlisle, who competed in the 1920 Summer Olympics.

== Biography ==
Smith was educated at Marlborough College and studied at Trinity Hall, Cambridge, where he won a blue in 1909.

After University he played club hockey for Beckenham and county hockey for Kent.

He also played for Blackheath, and later Lowestoft and the East.

In 1911, he made his England debut and during World War I he served as a lieutenant in the British Army.

At the 1920 Olympic Games in Antwerp, he represented Great Britain at the hockey tournament.

After his playing career, he worked as a director in the family businesses: the textile manufacturers Stapley & Smith and the insurance brokers Smith & Burns.
