= Hans Jørgen Hansen =

Danish field hockey player

Olympic medal record

Men's field hockey
Silver medal – second place	1920 Antwerp	Team competition

Hans Jørgen Hansen (6 October 1879, Tved – 10 December 1966, Frederiksberg) was a Danish field hockey player who competed in the 1920 Summer Olympics. He was a member of the Danish field hockey team, which won the silver medal.

At the club level, he played for Københavns Hockeyklub.
