= Arthur Leighton =

British field hockey player

Personal information
- Born: 6 March 1889 Esk, Queensland, Australia
- Died: 15 June 1939 (aged 50) Walsall, England

Sport
- Sport: Field hockey
- Position: Centre-forward
Senior career
Years	Team	Caps	Goals
1919–1922	Walsall	-	-
National team
Years	Team	Caps	Goals
1909–1921	England & GB	27	-
Medal record
Men's field hockey
Gold medal – first place	1920 Antwerp	Team competition

Arthur Francis Leighton MC (6 March 1889 – 15 June 1939) was a British field hockey player who competed in the 1920 Summer Olympics.

== Biography ==
Born in Australia, Leighton was educated at Bishop's Stortford College and studied at Caius College, Cambridge. At Cambridge, he won a blue in 1908, 1909, and 1910 and captained the Cambridge team in his final year. He also made his England debut in 1909.

He served with the Royal Field Artillery during World War I, won a Military Cross as a lieutenant, and was severely gassed, despite which he continued to play.

He played club hockey for Walsall and representative hockey for the Midlands and Staffordshire. At the 1920 Olympic Games in Antwerp, he represented Great Britain at the hockey tournament.

He retired from playing in 1927 and worked for AS Smith & Sons hardware manufacturers in Walsall, in addition to being appointed an England selector.
