= Eric Crockford =

English field hockey player and cricketer

Personal information
- Born: 13 October 1888 Wylde Green, Birmingham, England
- Died: 17 January 1958 (aged 69) Four Oaks, Birmingham, England

Sport
- Sport: Field hockey
Senior career
Years	Team	Caps	Goals
1919–1927	Sutton Coldfield	-	-
National team
Years	Team	Caps	Goals
–	England & GB	17	-
Medal record
Men's field hockey
Gold medal – first place	1920 Antwerp	Team competition

Eric Bertram Crockford (13 October 1888 – 17 January 1958) was a British field hockey player who competed in the 1920 Summer Olympics. He was a member of the British field hockey team, which won the gold medal.

== Biography ==
Crockford was educated at Eastbourne College.

Crockford played club hockey for Sutton Coldfield Hockey Club and for Warwickshire at county level.

At the 1920 Olympic Games in Antwerp, he represented Great Britain at the hockey tournament. He also played first-class cricket for Warwickshire in 21 matches between 1911 and 1922.

He practiced as a solicitor.
