= Thorvald Eigenbrod =

Danish field hockey player

Olympic medal record

Men's field hockey
Silver medal – second place	1920 Antwerp	Team competition

Jakob Thorvald Eigenbrod (2 December 1892 in Aalborg, Denmark – 5 May 1977 in Munkebjerg, Denmark) was a Danish field hockey player who competed in the 1920 Summer Olympics. He was a member of the Danish field hockey team, which won the silver medal.

Professionally, he was a lawyer.
