= George McGrath (field hockey) =

British field hockey player

Personal information
- Born: 19 September 1885 Camberwell, England
- Died: 6 August 1956 (aged 70) Croydon, England

Sport
- Sport: Field hockey
- Position: Inside-forward
Senior career
Years	Team	Caps	Goals
1912–1923	Wimbledon	-	-
National team
Years	Team	Caps	Goals
–	GB		-
Medal record
Representing Great Britain
Men's Field hockey
Olympic Games
Gold medal – first place	1920 Antwerp	Team

George Frederick McGrath (19 September 1885 – 6 August 1956) was a British field hockey player. He won a gold medal at the 1920 Summer Olympics in Antwerp.

== Biography ==
McGrath was born in Camberwell, the son of a post office worker.

He played club hockey for Wimbledon Hockey Club from 1912, a club he revived after World War I, and became its honorary secretary and treasurer. During the war he served as a lieutenant at the Royal School of Artillery.

At the 1920 Olympic Games in Antwerp, he represented Great Britain at the hockey tournament.
