= Colin Campbell (field hockey) =

British field hockey player (1887–1955)

Personal information
- Born: 4 November 1887 Rocester, England
- Died: 25 August 1955 (aged 67) Stafford, England

Sport
- Sport: Field hockey
- Position: Half-back
Senior career
Years	Team	Caps	Goals
1913–1920	Stafford	-	-
–	Wolverhampton	-	-
National team
Years	Team	Caps	Goals
–	England		-
–	GB		-
Medal record
Men's field hockey
Representing United Kingdom
Gold medal – first place	1920 Antwerp	Team competition

Colin Herbert Campbell (4 November 1887 – 25 August 1955) was a British field hockey player who competed in the 1920 Summer Olympics as a member of the British field hockey team, which won the gold medal.

== Biography ==
During World War I Campbell served with the Royal Field Artillery.

Campbell played club hockey for Stafford, Wolverhampton and representative hockey for Staffordshire and the Midlands.

At the 1920 Olympic Games in Antwerp, he represented Great Britain at the hockey tournament.

By trade, Campbell worked in the family businesses called The Campbell Tile Company and Mintons Chinaware, the latter of which was merged into the famous Royal Doulton company in 1968.
