= Henning Holst =

Field hockey player

Olympic medal record

Men's field hockey
Silver medal – second place	1920 Antwerp	Team competition

Henning Holst (25 October 1891 – 20 March 1975) was a Danish field hockey player who competed in the 1920 Summer Olympics, in the 1928 Summer Olympics, and in the 1936 Summer Olympics. He was born in Copenhagen and died in Helleruplund, Gentofte.

In 1920, he was a member of the Danish field hockey team, which won the silver medal. Eight years later, he also participated with the Danish team in the 1928 Olympic tournament. He played all four matches as halfback and scored three goals. His last Olympic appearance was in 1936 when he was eliminated with the Danish team in the first round of the Olympic tournament. He played both matches.
