= Raoul Daufresne de la Chevalerie =

Belgian general and sportsman

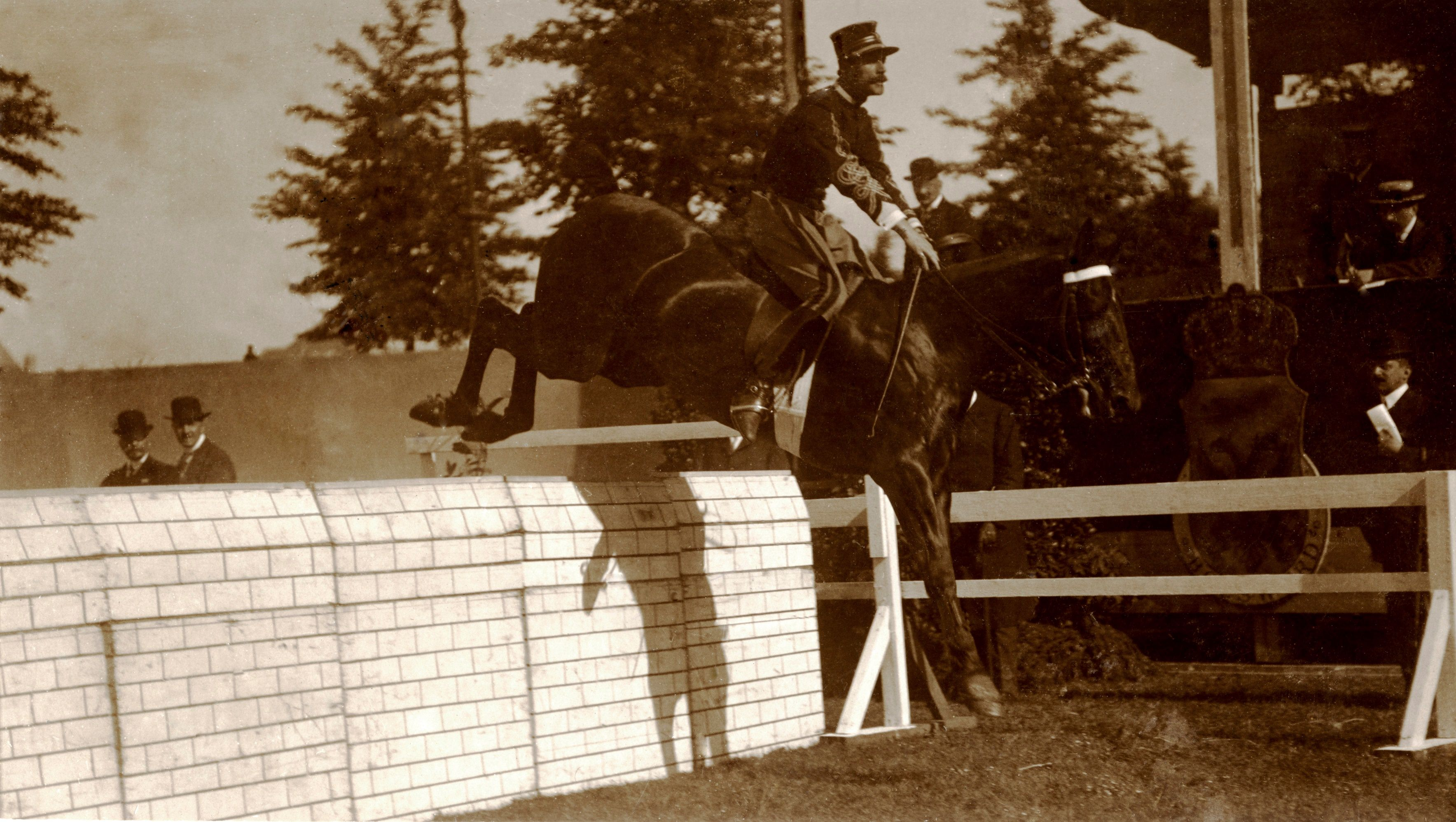
- Born: 17 March 1881; Bruges, Belgium
- Died: 25 November 1967 (aged 86); Uccle, Belgium
- Occupations: Sportsman; Football Player; Field Hockey Player; Commander

Olympic medal record

Men's field hockey
| Bronze medal – third place | 1920 Antwerp | Team competition |

Lieutenant-General Raoul Daufresne de la Chevalerie (17 March 1881 – 25 November 1967) was a Belgian sportsman and commander of the Free Belgian forces during the Second World War. He was born in Bruges and died in Uccle.

== Sporting career ==
He was a football player for Cercle Brugge from 1903 until 1907. In his last 2 years at Cercle, he was also president of the team, succeeding Leon De Meester. His player career and presidency at Cercle Brugge ended abruptly when he moved to Cercle's rivals, Club Brugge to become a member of the board as well as a player for the blue and black side.

But football wasn't the only sport Raoul Daufresne de la Chevalerie was practising. He was also an equestrian and he played hockey and tennis. At the 1920 Summer Olympics in Antwerp, Daufresne de la Chevalerie was coach of the Belgian football team. He also represented Belgium as hockey player (winning the bronze medal) at these Olympics.

== World War II ==
During the military mobilisation of Belgium in 1939, he was appointed to command the 17th Division. After the Germans occupied Belgium he was captured, but quickly released.

He fled from Belgium to Great Britain, where he was given command of the Free Belgian land forces with the rank of Lieutenant General. After the war ended, he was briefly a military attaché to Czechoslovakia, and subsequently retired from the military.

== Sources ==
- Decat, Frank (2007). De Belgen in Engeland 40/45: de Belgische strijdkrachten in Groot-Brittannië tijdens WOII. Tielt: Lannoo. ISBN 978-90-209-6981-8.
- De Vos, Luc (2001). "The Reconstruction of Belgian Military Forces in Britain, 1940-1945". In Conway, Martin; Gotovitch, José (eds.). Europe in exile : European exile communities in Britain 1940-45 (1st ed.). New York: Berghahn. pp. 81–99. ISBN 1-57181-503-1.
