= Maurice van den Bemden =

Belgian tennis player and field hockey player

Medal record

Representing Belgium

Men's Field hockey

Olympic Games
Bronze medal – third place	1920 Antwerp	Team

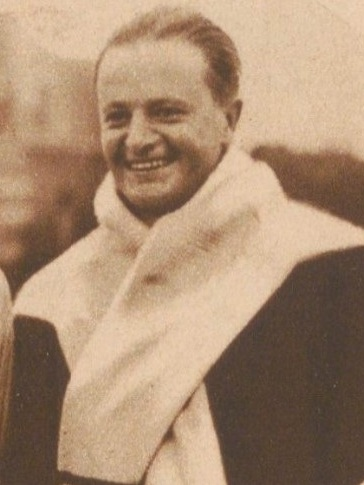
Maurice van den Bemden

Maurice van den Bemden (22 November 1891 – 20 December 1967) was a Belgian field hockey player and tennis player. He won a bronze medal at the 1920 Summer Olympics in Antwerp with the Belgium national field hockey team. He also competed in tennis at the 1920 Summer Olympics.
