= Hans Herlak =

Danish field hockey player

Olympic medal record

Men's field hockey
Silver medal – second place	1920 Antwerp	Team competition

Hans Christian Jensen Herlak (4 August 1881 in Jelling, Denmark – 29 January 1970 in Gentofte, Denmark) was a Danish field hockey player who competed in the 1920 Summer Olympics. He was a member of the Danish field hockey team, which won the silver medal.

At the club level, he played for Københavns Hockeyklub.

Professionally, he was the head teacher at Skovshoved Skole.
