= Charles Atkin =

British field hockey player (1889–1958)

Personal information
- Born: 26 February 1889 Sheffield, England
- Died: 9 May 1958 (aged 69) Sheffield, England

Sport
- Sport: Field hockey
- Position: Full-back
Senior career
Years	Team	Caps	Goals
1910–1920	Beckenham	-	-
National team
Years	Team	Caps	Goals
1913–1921	England & GB		-
Medal record
Men's field hockey
Gold medal – first place	1920 Antwerp	Team competition

Charles Sydney Atkin (26 February 1889 – 9 May 1958) was a British field hockey player who competed in the 1920 Summer Olympics. He was a member of the British field hockey team which won the gold medal.

== Biography ==
Atkin was educated at Marlborough College and studied at Caius College, Cambridge, where he won a blue in 1909 and 1910 during the varsity match against Oxford. After university, he became a medical student at St Bartholomew's Hospital.

He played club hockey for Beckenham and represented Kent at county level. He made his debut for England in 1913, playing three matches before World War I interrupted his career. He served in the Royal Army Medical Corps as a captain.

After the war, he joined the family medical practice in Sheffield, and at the 1920 Olympic Games in Antwerp, he played as a left back during the hockey competition. His final international appearance was against Ireland in 1921.
