= Frands Faber =

Danish field hockey player

Olympic medal record

Men's field hockey
Silver medal – second place	1920 Antwerp	Team competition

Eli Frands Johannes Faber (22 April 1897 – 23 June 1933) was a Danish field hockey player who competed in the 1920 Summer Olympics. He was a member of the Danish field hockey team, which won the silver medal.

At club level, he played for Orient in Lyngby.

He was educated as a doctor.
