= Paul Metz =

Danish field hockey player

Olympic medal record

Men's field hockey
Silver medal – second place	1920 Antwerp	Team competition

Paul Metz (17 November 1892 – 8 September 1975) was a Danish field hockey player who competed in the 1920 Summer Olympics. He was a member of the Danish field hockey team, which won the silver medal.

At club level, he played for Københavns Hockeyklub.
