= Sholto Marcon =

Clergyman, schoolmaster and hockey player

Personal information
- Born: 31 March 1890 Headington, Oxford, England
- Died: 17 November 1959 (aged 69) Tenterden, England

Sport
- Sport: Field hockey
Senior career
Years	Team	Caps	Goals
1912–1920	Oxton	-	-
?–1927	Hampstead & Westminster	-	-
National team
Years	Team	Caps	Goals
–	England		-
–	GB		-
Medal record
Men's field hockey
Gold medal – first place	1920 Antwerp	Team competition

Charles Sholto Wyndham Marcon (31 March 1890 – 17 November 1959), known as Sholto Marcon, was a Church of England schoolmaster, clergyman and international field hockey player.

== Biography ==
Born at Headington, Oxford, the only son of Charles Abdy Marcon and his wife Sophia Wyndham Winter, Marcon was educated at Lancing and at Oriel College, Oxford. On 14 September 1914, only a few days after the outset of the First World War, he was commissioned as a second lieutenant into the Oxfordshire and Buckinghamshire Light Infantry. Following the war he became a schoolmaster at Cranleigh. He was a Royal Air Force chaplain from 1943 to 1945, with the rank of Squadron Leader, and ended his career as Vicar of Tenterden in Kent, where he died on 17 November 1959.

At Lancing, Marcon played in the cricket 1st XI in 1907–1908. He was a University of Oxford field hockey blue in 1910, 1911, 1912, and 1913, in his final year captaining the team, and went on to play for England, earning 23 caps.

At the 1920 Olympic Games in Antwerp, he represented Great Britain at the hockey tournament.

After playing club hockey for Oxton he played for Hampstead & Westminster.
