= Reginald Crummack =

British field hockey player

Rex Crummack
Personal information
- Born: 16 February 1887 Salford, England
- Died: 25 October 1966 (aged 79) Stockport, England

Sport
- Sport: Field hockey
Senior career
Years	Team	Caps	Goals
1919–1929	Alderley Edge	-	-
National team
Years	Team	Caps	Goals
–	England & GB	5	-
Medal record
Men's field hockey
Gold medal – first place	1920 Antwerp	Team competition

Reginald William Crummack (16 February 1887 – 25 October 1966) was a British field hockey player who competed in the 1920 Summer Olympics. He was a member of the British field hockey team, which won the gold medal, but he did not play in any matches.

== Biography ==
Crummack was born in Salford to a wealthy Lancashire family and was educated to with the intention of taking a career in the cotton business.

He played club hockey for Alderley Edge and during World War I served with the South Lancashire Regiment. He was wounded during the war which affcted his long term health and was awarded the Victory and British War medals and the 1915 Star.

At the 1920 Olympic Games in Antwerp, he represented Great Britain at the hockey tournament.

After retiring from playing after 1926 he was later appointed international hockey selector in 1931.

Crummack was also a competent golfer between 1909 and 1946 and took part in The Amateur Championship, both before World War I and after World War II, and was the Lancashire Amateur winner in 1911-12 and 1920.
