= Robert Gevers =

Belgian field hockey player

Olympic medal record

Men's field hockey

Representing Belgium
Bronze medal – third place	1920 Antwerp	Team competition

Robert Gevers (6 October 1882 – 13 June 1936) was a Belgian field hockey player who competed in the 1920 Summer Olympics. He was a member of the Belgian field hockey team, which won the bronze medal.
