= André Becquet =

Belgian field hockey player (1893–1975)

Olympic medal record

Men's field hockey

Representing Belgium
Bronze medal – third place	1920 Antwerp	Team competition

André Henri Émile Antoine Joseph Marie Becquet (19 February 1893 – 31 August 1975) was a Belgian field hockey player who competed in the 1920 Summer Olympics. He was a member of the Belgian field hockey team, which won the bronze medal.

From the 1920–21 season onwards, Becquet played for Léopold Club. With that club, he also became national champion.
