= Jack MacBryan =

English cricketer

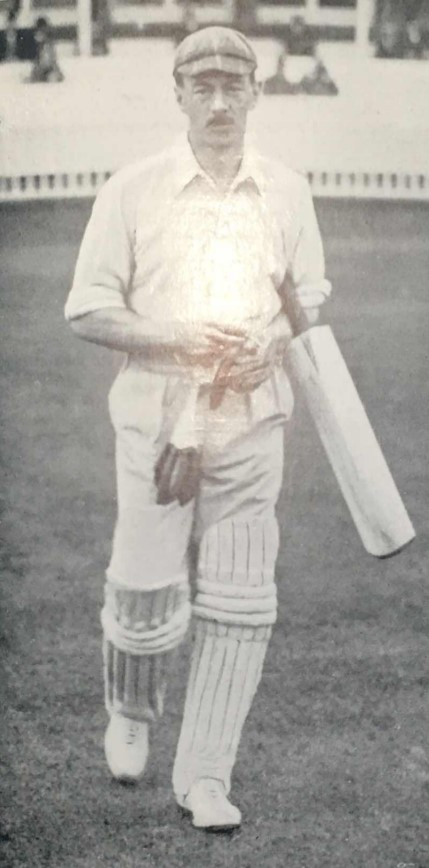
- Born: 22 July 1892; Box, Wiltshire, England
- Died: 14 July 1983 (aged 90); Cambridge, England
- Field hockey career
- Sport: Field hockey
Medal record
Men's Field Hockey
Representing Great Britain
Olympic Games
Gold medal – first place	1920 Antwerp	Team competition
- Cricket career

Cricket information
- Batting: Right-handed

International information
- National side: England
- Only Test (cap 221): 26 July 1924 v South Africa

Domestic team information
- Years: Team
- 1911–1936: Somerset

Career statistics
Competition	Tests	First-class
Matches	1	206
Runs scored	–	10,322
Batting average	–	29.49
100s/50s	–/–	18/48
Top score	–	164
Catches/stumpings	–/–	128/–
- Source: ESPNcricinfo, 3 May 2011

John Crawford William MacBryan (22 July 1892 – 14 July 1983) was an English cricketer who played for Cambridge University and Somerset and made one almost imperceptible appearance in a Test match for England. MacBryan was also a field hockey international and won a gold medal at the 1920 Olympic Games.

== Biography ==
MacBryan was educated at Exeter School, where he played cricket for the school and was captain in 1911. After school he joined the Somerset Light Infantry. In 1914, a month after the outbreak of World War I, he was wounded and captured at the battle of Le Cateau, and he was a prisoner for the rest of the war. After the war he went up to Jesus College, Cambridge, where he won his blue for cricket in 1920.

An amateur and a right-hand batsman, MacBryan was the leading Somerset batsman in the years after the World War I and was called up for the Old Trafford Test match against the South Africans in 1924. But the match was ruined by rain, and MacBryan remains the only Test cricketer who neither batted, bowled nor dismissed anyone in the field (where he spent 66.5 overs). His chance never came again.

At the 1920 Olympic Games in Antwerp, he represented Great Britain at the hockey tournament.

He was a Wisden Cricketer of the Year in 1925.

== See also ==
- One Test Wonder

Preceded by Andrew Sandham	Oldest Living Test Cricketer; 20 April 1982 – 14 July 1983	Succeeded by Percy Fender
