= Adolphe Goemaere =

Belgian field hockey player

Olympic medal record

Men's field hockey

Representing Belgium
Bronze medal – third place	1920 Antwerp	Team competition

Adolphe Joseph Henri Goemaere (7 May 1895 – 12 September 1970) was a Belgian field hockey player who competed in the 1920 Summer Olympics and in the 1928 Summer Olympics.

In 1920, he was a member of the Belgian field hockey team, which won the bronze medal. Eight years later, he finished fourth with the Belgian team at the 1928 Olympic tournament. He played only in the bronze medal match as halfback.
