= Cyril Wilkinson =

English field hockey player and cricketer

Personal information
- Born: 4 October 1884 Elvet Hill, England
- Died: 16 December 1970 (aged 86) Honiton, England

Sport
- Sport: Field hockey
Senior career
Years	Team	Caps	Goals
1911–1929	Hampstead & Westminster	-	-
National team
Years	Team	Caps	Goals
–	England & GB	4	-
Medal record
Men's field hockey
Gold medal – first place	1920 Antwerp	Team competition

Cyril Theodore Anstruther Wilkinson CBE (4 October 1884 – 16 December 1970) was an English field hockey player who competed in the 1920 Summer Olympics for Great Britain. The team won the gold medal. He was also a cricketer, as well as Registrar of the Probate and Divorce Registry from 1936 to 1959.

== Hockey ==
At the 1920 Olympic Games in Antwerp, he represented Great Britain at the hockey tournament. He also represented and captained the England side. At club level, he played for Hampstead & Westminster Hockey Club.

== Cricket ==
He made his debut in first-class cricket for The Gentlemen of England in 1908. He subsequently played for Surrey between 1909 and 1920. He captained the side in 1914, when it won the County Championship, 1919 and 1920, though he had to miss a number of matches through business commitments.

He was a useful right-handed batsman who, in 54 first-class appearances, scored 1,773 runs at an average of 25.32, with 3 centuries and a highest score of 135. This innings was against Middlesex at The Oval, and it took him less than two hours. He was an occasional slow left-arm bowler, with 23 wickets to his credit at 31.47 and best innings figures of 6-43.

His last senior match (though not first-class) was a two-day fixture in 1928 in which he played for the Civil Service cricket team against the touring West Indians. Subsequently, he was an enthusiastic club cricketer, He appeared every August for Sidmouth. In 1953, when aged 69, he scored 50 and took all ten wickets against the Nondescripts.

His father, Anthony Wilkinson, also played first-class cricket.

== Outside sport ==
He was born at Elvet Hill, County Durham, England and was educated at Blundell's School.

During his time as Registrar of the Probate and Divorce Registry, he was joint editor of the Seventh Edition of William Rayden's Practice and law in the Divorce Division of the High Court of Justice and on appeal therefrom, published in 1958 by Butterworth. The volume runs to 1311 pages. He was appointed as a Commander of The Most Excellent Order of the British Empire (CBE) in the 1954 Queen's Birthday Honours.

He died at Honiton, Devon, England.
