= Hans Bjerrum =

Danish field hockey player (1899–1979)

Olympic medal record

Men's field hockey
Silver medal – second place	1920 Antwerp	Team competition

Hans Adolf Bjerrum (8 September 1899 in Hellerup, Denmark – 10 May 1979 in London, England) was a Danish field hockey player who competed in the 1920 Summer Olympics.

He was a member of the Danish field hockey team, which won the silver medal. He later formed the Danish civil engineering company Bierrum, known for building cooling towers for power stations.

== Personal life ==
He married on 21 October 1924. He played hockey for Middlesex in the 1920s.

On 13 May 1928, they had a daughter, Johanne, who married Gerald Murray in 1955.

They lived at Peterborough House, on Grove Hill in Harrow, in the 1920s. They lived at The Orchard in Sudbury Hill, from the 1930s. In the 1930s he worked with the Anglo-Danish Society and the Danish Club (formed in 1863).

Due to his work, as chairman of the Danish Club, King Frederik IX of Denmark made him a Commander of the Order of the Dannebrog in December 1963. Structural engineer Sir Ove Arup also attended the Danish Club at this time.

His wife, Karen Gertrud Caroline Nielsen, born on 15 June 1900, died on 29 August 1979.

His son (Nils) Roger was born on 16 March 1931, who gained a first class degree in Engineering from Merton College, Oxford in 1957. Roger married Emily Doris Williamson in early 61, with children Stephen, Mary, Libby, Hugh and Hans. They would live in Pirton, Hertfordshire, west of Hitchin. Emily died on 12 October 1984, in Chesham. Roger remarried Violet Oliver in late 1986. Roger died on 16 January 2021, aged 89, having lived in Northchurch in Hertfordshire.

Another son, Alexander (Sandy) Milne, was born on 9 March 1944 and married Alison Mackenzie-Wood of Hertfordshire in early 1973. They had children Rona in November 1979, and Serena in early 1981. Sandy died on 1 October 2022.

== See also ==
- Povl Ahm
