= Jean Van Nerom =

Belgian field hockey player

Olympic medal record

Men's field hockey

Representing Belgium
Bronze medal – third place	1920 Antwerp	Team competition

Jean Prosper Charles Léon Marie Edouard Van Nerom (born 9 July 1896, date of death unknown) was a Belgian field hockey player who competed in the 1920 Summer Olympics. He was a member of the Belgian field hockey team, which won the bronze medal.
