= Andreas Rasmussen =

Danish field hockey player

Olympic medal record

Men's field hockey
Silver medal – second place	1920 Antwerp	Team competition

Andreas Engelbert Rasmussen (15 March 1893 in Aalborg, Denmark – 23 February 1967 in Aalborg, Denmark) was a Danish field hockey player who played as a goalkeeper. He competed in the 1920 Summer Olympics. He was a member of the Danish field hockey team, which won the silver medal.

At club level, he played for Københavns Hockeyklub.
