= Harold Cooke (field hockey) =

British field hockey player

Personal information
- Born: 7 September 1895 Shackerstone, England
- Died: 23 July 1966 (aged 70) Middlesbrough, England

Sport
- Sport: Field hockey
Senior career
Years	Team	Caps	Goals
1919–1920	Birmingham Univ	-	-
1921–1925	Saltburn	-	-
1926–1927	West Hartlepool	-	-
National team
Years	Team	Caps	Goals
–	England & GB	4	-

Harold Douglas Cooke (7 September 1895 – 23 July 1966) was a British field hockey player. He competed in the men's tournament at the 1920 Summer Olympics, and was part of the gold medal winning team.

== Biography ==
Cooke studied engineering, accountancy, German, metallurgy, and chemistry at the University of Birmingham.

Cooke played club hockey for University of Birmingham Hockey Club and represented Warwickshire at county level.

At the 1920 Olympic Games in Antwerp, he represented Great Britain at the hockey tournament.

Sometime after the Olympics, he moved north and played for Saltburn, West Hartlepool Caledonians, and Redcar, and, at representative level, for Yorkshire and the North.

He was part of the selection committee for the Yorkshire Hockey Association from 1933.
