= Charles Guiette =

Belgian field hockey player

Olympic medal record

Men's field hockey

Representing Belgium
Bronze medal – third place	1920 Antwerp	Team competition

Carolus Maria Emmanuel Josephus "Charles" Guiette (born 28 March 1885) was a Belgian field hockey player who competed in the 1920 Summer Olympics. He was a member of the Belgian field hockey team, which won the bronze medal. He was born in Antwerp.
