= Harry Haslam (field hockey) =

English field hockey player

Personal information
- Born: 7 February 1883 Aston, Birmingham
- Died: 7 February 1955 (aged 72) Ilford, England

Sport
- Sport: Field hockey
- Position: Goalkeeper
Senior career
Years	Team	Caps	Goals
1913–1928	Ilford	-	-
National team
Years	Team	Caps	Goals
–	England & GB	9	-
Medal record
Men's field hockey
Gold medal – first place	1920 Antwerp	Team competition

Harry Eustace Haslam OBE (7 February 1883 – 7 February 1955) was an English field hockey player from Aston, Warwickshire, who competed in the 1920 Summer Olympics.

== Biography ==
Haslam originally played for Worcestershire at the county level before moving south and playing his hockey for Ilford and Essex. He made his England debut in 1920. For his work as a Special Constabulary, he was awarded the OBE the same year.

At the 1920 Olympic Games in Antwerp, he represented Great Britain at the hockey tournament.

Later in life, Haslam worked for a sports goods manufacturer and served as a hockey administrator and hockey news editor. He died at Ilford, London, on his 72nd birthday in February 1955.
