= Harold Cassels =

British field hockey player

Personal information
- Born: 4 November 1898 Langzhong, China
- Died: 23 January 1975 (aged 76) Taunton, England

Sport
- Sport: Field hockey
- Position: Centre-half
–	Cambridge Univ	-	-
National team
Years	Team	Caps	Goals
–	England		-
–	GB		-
Medal record
Men's field hockey
Gold medal – first place	1920 Antwerp	Team competition

Harold Kennedy Cassels (4 November 1898 – 23 January 1975) was a British field hockey player who competed in the 1920 Summer Olympics.

== Biography ==
Cassels was born in Langzhong, Sichuan, western China, the son of a missionary and the first Bishop of West China, William Cassels. He was educated at St Lawrence College, Ramsgate where he played various sports, becoming captain of the football and hockey teams and vice-captain of cricket.

After leaving school, he joined the Royal Flying Corps and served during World War I, where he was mentioned in despatches before becoming a prisoner of war. After the war he studied at Queens' College, Cambridge and earned his blue in 1920 and 1921.

At the 1920 Olympic Games in Antwerp, he represented Great Britain at the hockey tournament.

After playing, he became a senior master at the Cathedral School in Shanghai, and later spent a spell in Australia in 1940. After World War II, he returned to England in 1946 and later became a house master at Millfield School.
