= Charles Delelienne =

Belgian field hockey player

Olympic medal record

Men's field hockey

Representing Belgium
| Bronze medal – third place | 1920 Antwerp | Team competition |

Charles Delelienne (25 February 1892 – 6 February 1984) was a Belgian field hockey player who competed in the 1920 Summer Olympics. He was the Keeper of the Ling Hockey Club and played in the Belgian National field hockey team, which won the bronze medal.
