= Steen Due =

Danish field hockey player

Olympic medal record

Men's field hockey
Silver medal – second place	1920 Antwerp	Team competition

Steen Due (27 February 1898 – 26 May 1974) was a Danish field hockey player who competed in the 1920 Summer Olympics. He was a member of the Danish field hockey team, which won the silver medal.

On the club level, he played for Orient in Lyngby.

Professionally, he was an engineer.
