= Stanley Shoveller =

Field hockey player

Personal information
- Born: 2 September 1881 Kingston Hill, England
- Died: 24 February 1959 (aged 77) Broadstone, England

Sport
- Sport: Field hockey
- Position: Centre–forward
Senior career
Years	Team	Caps	Goals
1899–1920	Hampstead	-	-
National team
Years	Team	Caps	Goals
–	England	29	(76)
Medal record
Men's field hockey
Representing (United Kingdom) Great Britain (England)
Gold medal – first place	1908 London	Team competition
Representing (United Kingdom) Great Britain
Gold medal – first place	1920 Antwerp	Team competition

Stanley Howard Shoveller MC (2 September 1881 – 24 February 1959) was a field hockey player, who won a gold medal with the England team at the 1908 Summer Olympics in London. Twelve years later, when Antwerp hosted the 1920 Summer Olympics, he once again won the gold medal with the Great Britain squad, at age 39.

== Biography ==
Shoveller was educated at Kingston Grammar School. He played his club hockey for Hampstead Hockey Club from age 18. He was known as "the Prince of centre forwards" and "the immortal centre" for his prolific goal scoring – it's been estimated to be 'well over 500', remarkable in an era of 4-2-3-1 and sweepers.

In World War I, he was awarded an MC in 1915 for his service with the 33rd London Regiment Rifle Brigade.

At the 1920 Olympic Games in Antwerp, he represented Great Britain at the hockey tournament.

After his playing career he became a stockbroker on the London Stock Exchange.
