= Erik Husted =

Danish field hockey player

Olympic medal record

Men's Field hockey
Silver medal – second place	1920 Antwerp	Team competition

Erik Husted (3 January 1900 – 10 July 1988) was a Danish field hockey player who competed in the 1920 Summer Olympics and in the 1928 Summer Olympics. He was born in Helsingør and died in Copenhagen. He was the older brother of Otto Husted.

In 1920, he was a member of the Danish field hockey team, which won the silver medal. Eight years later, he also participated with the Danish team in the 1928 Olympic tournament. He played all four matches as a forward and scored one goal.

At club level, he played for Københavns Hockeyklub and Orient in Lyngby.

At the 1948 Olympics he acted as a referee.

Professionally, he was a professor of maxillofacial surgery at Københavns Tandlægehøjskole and later its principal.
