= Athletics at the 1932 Summer Olympics =

Athletics at the Games of the X Olympiad
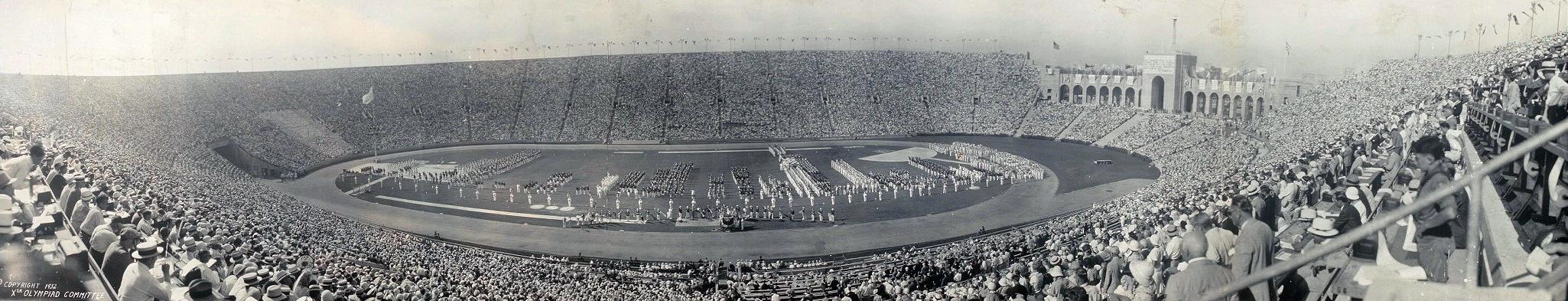
- No. of events: 29
- Competitors: 386 from 34 nations

At the 1932 Summer Olympics in Los Angeles, 29 athletics events were contested. It was the first time the 50 kilometres race walk appeared in the athletic program at the Games. This was the second time women's events in athletics were included in the Olympic Games program and the first time that women competed in the javelin throw and 80 m hurdles at the Olympics. There was a total of 386 participants from 34 countries competing.

The athletics events took place at Los Angeles Olympic Stadium, now the Los Angeles Memorial Coliseum.

== Medal summary ==
Rank	Nation	Gold	Silver	Bronze	Total
1	United States	16	13	6	35
2	Finland	3	4	4	11
3	Great Britain	2	4	2	8
4	Poland	2	0	1	3
5	Ireland	2	0	0	2
6	Canada	1	3	5	9
7	Japan	1	1	2	4
8	Italy	1	0	2	3
9	Argentina	1	0	0	1
10	Germany	0	2	3	5
11	Latvia	0	1	0	1
11	Sweden	0	1	0	1
13	Czechoslovakia	0	0	1	1
13	France	0	0	1	1
13	Philippines	0	0	1	1
13	South Africa	0	0	1	1
Totals (16 entries)		29	29	29	87

=== Men ===
Event	Gold		Silver		Bronze	
100 metres	Eddie Tolan; United States	10.3	Ralph Metcalfe; United States	10.3	Arthur Jonath; Germany	10.4
200 metres	Eddie Tolan; United States	21.2	George Simpson; United States	21.4	Ralph Metcalfe; United States	21.5
400 metres	Bill Carr; United States	46.2	Ben Eastman; United States	46.4	Alex Wilson; Canada	47.4
800 metres	Tommy Hampson; Great Britain	1:49.7	Alex Wilson; Canada	1:49.9	Phil Edwards; Canada	1:51.5
1500 metres	Luigi Beccali; Italy	3:51.2	Jerry Cornes; Great Britain	3:52.6	Phil Edwards; Canada	3:52.8
5000 metres	Lauri Lehtinen; Finland	14:30.0	Ralph Hill; United States	14:30.0	Lauri Virtanen; Finland	14:44.0
10,000 metres	Janusz Kusociński; Poland	30:11.4	Volmari Iso-Hollo; Finland	30:12.6	Lauri Virtanen; Finland	30:35.0
110 metres hurdles	George Saling; United States	14.6	Percy Beard; United States	14.7	Donald Finlay; Great Britain	14.8
400 metres hurdles	Bob Tisdall; Ireland	51.8	Glenn Hardin; United States	51.9	Morgan Taylor; United States	52.0
3000 metres steeplechase	Volmari Iso-Hollo; Finland	10:33.4	Thomas Evenson; Great Britain	10:46.0	Joe McCluskey; United States	10:46.2
4 × 100 metres relay	United States; Bob Kiesel; Hector Dyer; Emmett Toppino; Frank Wykoff	40.0	Germany; Friedrich Hendrix; Erich Borchmeyer; Arthur Jonath; Helmut Körnig	40.9	Italy; Giuseppe Castelli; Gabriele Salviati; Ruggero Maregatti; Edgardo Toetti	41.2
4 × 400 metres relay	United States; Ivan Fuqua; Ed Ablowich; Karl Warner; Bill Carr	3:08.2	Great Britain; Crew Stoneley; Tommy Hampson; David Burghley; Godfrey Rampling	3:11.2	Canada; James Ball; Ray Lewis; Phil Edwards; Alex Wilson	3:12.8
Marathon	Juan Carlos Zabala; Argentina	2:31:36	Sam Ferris; Great Britain	2:31:55	Armas Toivonen; Finland	2:32:12
50 kilometres walk	Tommy Green; Great Britain	4:50:10	Jānis Daliņš; Latvia	4:57:20	Ugo Frigerio; Italy	4:59:06
High jump	Duncan McNaughton; Canada	1.97 m	Bob Van Osdel; United States	1.97 m	Simeon Toribio; Philippines	1.97 m
Pole vault	Bill Miller; United States	4.315 m	Shuhei Nishida; Japan	4.30 m	George Jefferson; United States	4.20 m
Long jump	Ed Gordon; United States	7.64 m	Lambert Redd; United States	7.60 m	Chuhei Nambu; Japan	7.45 m
Triple jump	Chuhei Nambu; Japan	15.72 m	Erik Svensson; Sweden	15.32 m	Kenkichi Oshima; Japan	15.12 m
Shot put	Leo Sexton; United States	16.00 m	Harlow Rothert; United States	15.67 m	František Douda; Czechoslovakia	15.61 m
Discus throw	John Anderson; United States	49.49 m	Henri LaBorde; United States	48.47 m	Paul Winter; France	47.85 m
Hammer throw	Pat O'Callaghan; Ireland	53.92 m	Ville Pörhölä; Finland	52.27 m	Peter Zaremba; United States	50.33 m
Javelin throw	Matti Järvinen; Finland	72.71 m	Matti Sippala; Finland	69.80 m	Eino Penttilä; Finland	68.70 m
Decathlon	James Bausch; United States	8462.23	Akilles Järvinen; Finland	8292.48	Wolrad Eberle; Germany	8030.80

=== Women ===
Games	Gold		Silver		Bronze	
100 metres	Stanisława Walasiewicz; Poland	11.9	Hilda Strike; Canada	11.9	Wilhelmina von Bremen; United States	12.0
80 metres hurdles	Babe Didrikson; United States	11.7	Evelyne Hall; United States	11.7	Marjorie Clark; South Africa	11.8
4 × 100 metres relay	United States; Mary Carew; Evelyn Furtsch; Annette Rogers; Wilhelmina von Bremen	47.0	Canada; Mary Frizzel; Mildred Fizzell; Lillian Palmer; Hilda Strike	47.0	Great Britain; Nellie Halstead; Eileen Hiscock; Gwendoline Porter; Violet Webb	47.6
High jump	Jean Shiley; United States	1.65 m	Babe Didrikson; United States	1.65 m	Eva Dawes; Canada	1.60 m
Discus throw	Lillian Copeland; United States	40.58 m	Ruth Osburn; United States	40.12 m	Jadwiga Wajs; Poland	38.74 m
Javelin throw	Babe Didrikson; United States	43.69 m	Ellen Braumüller; Germany	43.50 m	Tilly Fleischer; Germany	43.01 m

== Participating Nations ==
- Argentina (11)
- Australia (4)
- Austria (4)
- Brazil (21)
- Canada (29)
- Republic of China (1)
- Colombia (1)
- Cuba (3)
- Czechoslovakia (3)
- Denmark (2)
- Estonia (1)
- Finland (21)
- France (12)
- Germany (27)
- Great Britain (25)
- Greece (9)
- Haiti (2)
- Hungary (6)
- India (4)
- Ireland (4)
- Italy (21)
- Japan (34)
- Latvia (2)
- Mexico (27)
- Netherlands (7)
- New Zealand (6)
- Norway (3)
- Philippines (1)
- Poland (7)
- Portugal (1)
- South Africa (4)
- Sweden (9)
- Switzerland (3)
- United States (79)
- Yugoslavia (1)

== Records broken ==
Of the 29 events competed new Olympic records were set in all but three: men's long jump, high jump and hammer throw. World records were set in 10 events.

=== Men's world records ===
Event	Date	Round	Name	Nationality	Result
400 metres	5 August	Final	Bill Carr	United States	46.2
800 metres	2 August	Final	Tommy Hampson	Great Britain	1:49.8
4 × 100 metres relay	7 August	Final	Bob Kiesel; Hector Dyer; Emmett Toppino; Frank Wykoff	United States	40.0
4 × 400 metres relay	7 August	Final	Ivan Fuqua; Ed Ablowich; Karl Warner; Bill Carr	United States	3:08.2
Triple jump	4 August	Final	Chuhei Nambu	Japan	15.72 m
Decathlon	6 August	Final	James Bausch	United States	8462.235

=== Women's world records ===
Event	Date	Round	Name	Nationality	Result
100 metres	1 August	Heats	Stanisława Walasiewicz	Poland	11.9
80 metres hurdles	4 August	Final	Babe Didrikson	United States	11.7
80 metres hurdles	4 August	Final	Evelyne Hall	United States	11.7
4 × 100 metres relay	7 August	Final	Mary Carew; Evelyn Furtsch; Annette Rogers; Wilhelmina von Bremen	United States	47.0
4 × 100 metres relay	7 August	Final	Mary Frizzel; Mildred Fizzell; Lillian Palmer; Hilda Strike	Canada	47.0
High jump	7 August	Final	Jean Shiley	United States	1.65 m
High jump	7 August	Final	Babe Didrikson	United States	1.65 m
