= India at the 1932 Summer Olympics =

- Flag of India
- IOC code: IND
- NOC: Indian Olympic Association

in Los Angeles
- Competitors: 19 in 3 sports
- Flag bearer: Lal Shah Bokhari
- Medals Ranked 19th: Gold 1 Silver 0 Bronze 0 Total 1

Summer Olympics appearances (overview)
- 1900; 1904–1912; 1920; 1924; 1928; 1932; 1936; 1948; 1952; 1956; 1960; 1964; 1968; 1972; 1976; 1980; 1984; 1988; 1992; 1996; 2000; 2004; 2008; 2012; 2016; 2020; 2024

India competed at the 1932 Summer Olympics in Los Angeles, United States. The men's field hockey team won their second consecutive gold, which like the previous Olympic edition was India's solitary medal at the Games.

== Athletics ==
4 Indian athletes, all men, competed across 5 events in the 1932 Olympics.

Athlete	Event	Heat		Semifinals		Finals	
Athlete	Event	Result	Rank	Result	Rank	Result	Rank
Bunoo Sutton	100 m	11.4 s	4th	Did not advance			
Bunoo Sutton	110 m Hurdles	15.1 s	3rd	Unknown	4th	Did not advance	
Ronald Vernieux	100 m	11.0 s	4th	Did not advance			
Ronald Vernieux	200 m	22.8 s	4th	Did not advance			
Mehar Chand Dhawan	Triple Jump	N/A				13.66m	14th
Bunoo Sutton/Ronald Vernieux/ Mehar Chand Dhawan/Dickie Carr	4 × 100 m	N/A		43.7 s	5th	Did not advance	

== Aquatics ==
=== Swimming ===
One male athlete competed.

Men

Athlete	Event	Heat		Semifinal		Final	
Athlete	Event	Time	Rank	Time	Rank	Time	Rank
Nalin Malik	400 m freestyle	5:59.0	19	Did not advance			
Nalin Malik	1500 m freestyle	23:52.4	15	Did not advance			

== Field hockey ==
Due to the effects of The Great Depression and the cost of travel to the United States, only 3 Field Hockey teams ended up competing at the Olympics: India, Japan and the hosts, the USA. The event then took place as a short group stage competition, with each team playing each opponent once. To finance their travel, the Indian team played exhibition matches at every stop on their long journey by sea to Los Angeles. Once there, none of the teams even came close to the ability of the Indians, as Japan were beaten 11–1 and America were thrashed 24–1 on 11 August 1932, in the deciding game. The team even rotated the entire squad between games just so that all the players would get a medal. Dickie (Richard) Carr competed in both Field Hockey and the 4 × 100 m events.

=== Team ===
Richard Allen, Muhammad Aslam, Lal Bokhari (c), Frank Brewin, Richard Carr, Dhyan Chand, Leslie Hammond, Arthur Hind, Sayed Jaffar, Masud Minhas, Broome Pinniger, Gurmit Singh Kullar, Roop Singh, William Sullivan, and Carlyle Tapsell.

=== Results ===
Pos	Team	Pld	W	D	L	GF	GA	GD	Pts
1st place, gold medalist(s)	India	2	2	0	0	35	2	+33	2
2nd place, silver medalist(s)	Japan	2	1	0	1	10	13	−3	1
3rd place, bronze medalist(s)	United States (H)	2	0	0	2	3	33	−30	0

Source: Sports Reference
(H) Hosts

=== Matches ===
4 August 1932

India	11–1	Japan
Roop Singh (3); Kullar (3); Carr (1); Chand (4)		Inohara (1)

11 August 1932

India	24–1	United States
Roop Singh (10); Kullar (5); Pinniger (1); Chand (8)		Boddington (1)

== Medalists ==
=== Gold ===
- Richard Allen, Muhammad Aslam, Lal Bokhari, Frank Brewin, Richard Carr, Dhyan Chand, Leslie Hammond, Arthur Hind, Sayed Jaffar, Masud Minhas, Broome Pinniger, Gurmit Singh Kullar, Roop Singh, William Sullivan, and Carlyle Tapsell.

== Gallery ==
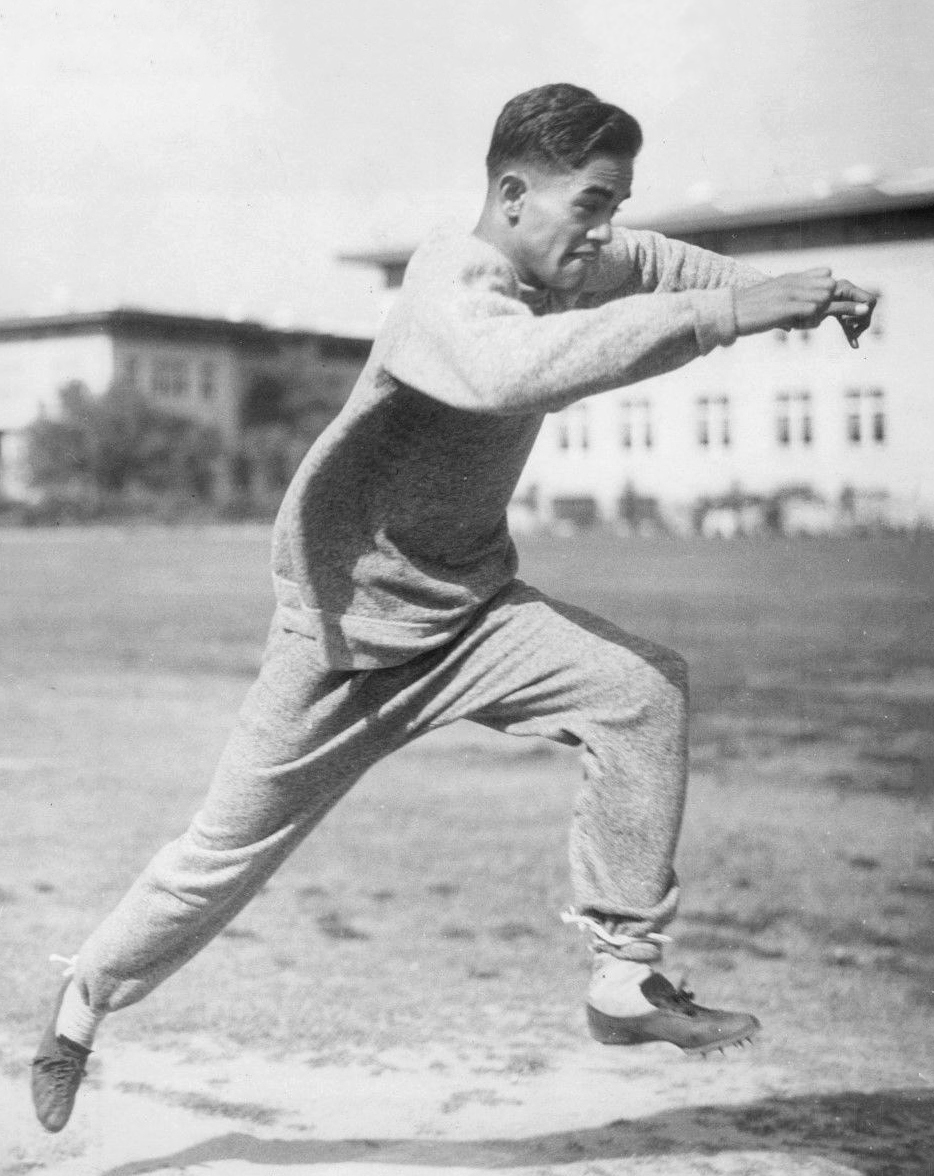
Mehar Chand Dhawan, British India's athlete who participated in the 1932 Summer Olympics at Los Angeles. -- ACME Photo

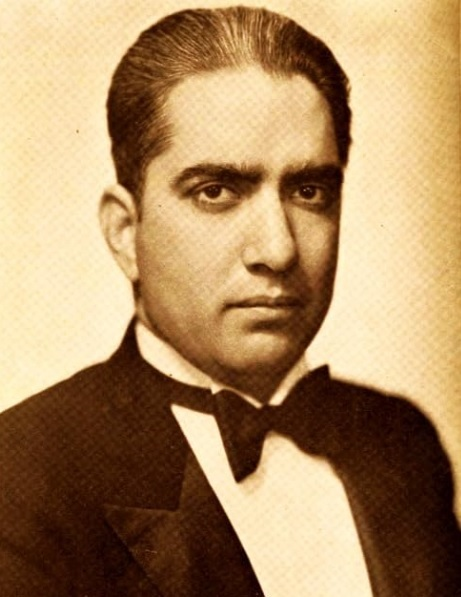
Lal Chand Mehra, British India's official attaché during the 1932 Summer Olympics at Los Angeles.
