= Italy at the Olympics in athletics =

Italy at the Summer Olympics in athletics
- WA code: ITA
- National federation: FIDAL
- Website: www.fidal.it
- Medals Ranked 9th: Gold 24 Silver 15 Bronze 26 Total 65

Summer appearances
- 1896; 1900; 1904; 1908; 1912; 1920; 1924; 1928; 1932; 1936; 1948; 1952; 1956; 1960; 1964; 1968; 1972; 1976; 1980; 1984; 1988; 1992; 1996; 2000; 2004; 2008; 2012; 2016; 2020; 2024; 2028

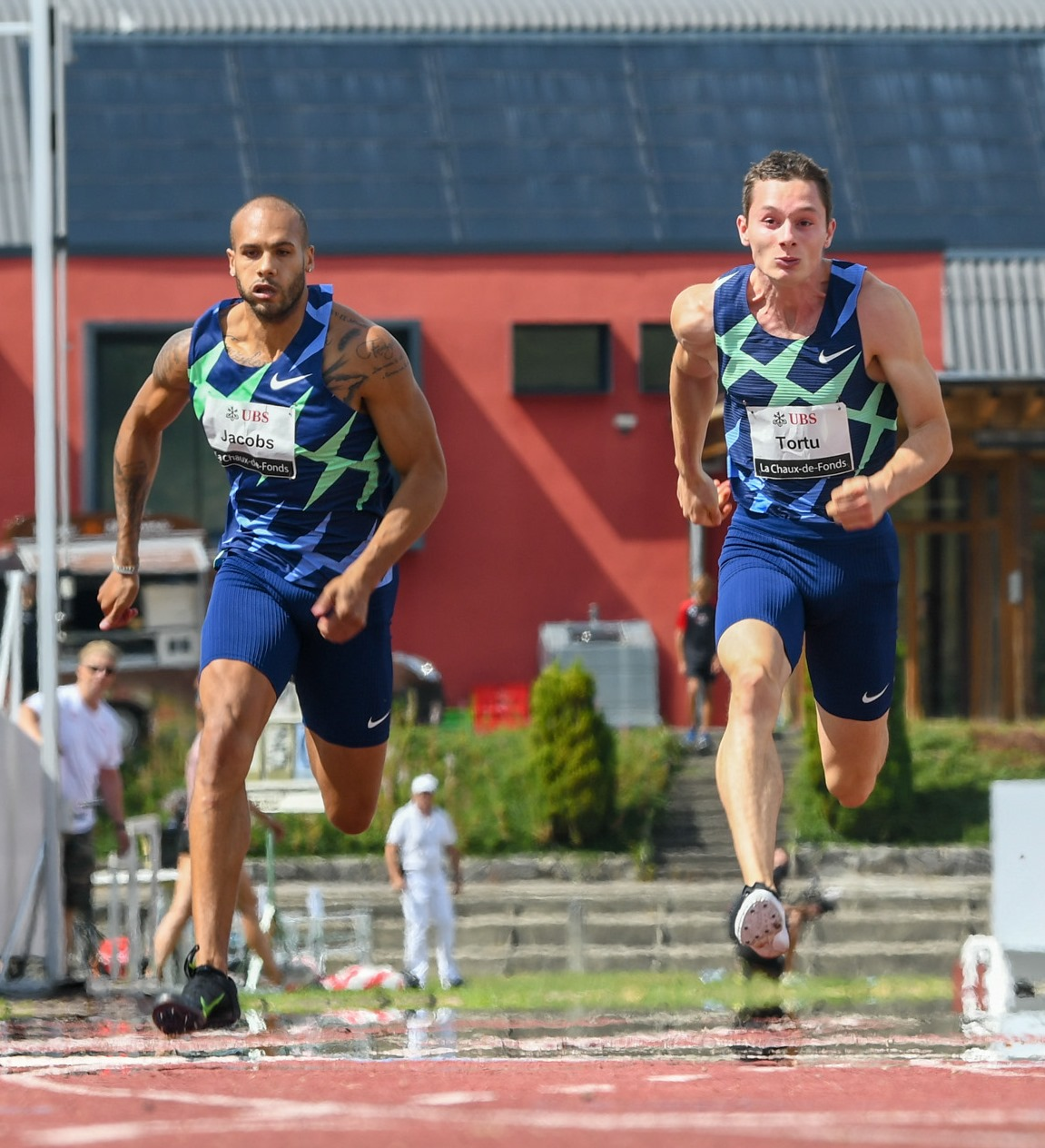
Marcell Jacobs and Filippo Tortu at the 2020 Resisprint in La Chaux-de-Fonds, Switzerland. The duo would go on to win gold for the 4×100 m relay team at the 2020 Summer Olympics.

Italy at the Olympics in athletics competed in all editions of the Summer Olympic Games with the exception of the 1904 Summer Olympics. The Italian National Olympic Committee (CONI) is the National Olympic Committee for the Italy.

== Placing table ==
World Athletics placing table assigns points to the top eight athletes in the final, with eight points to first place, seven to second place, and so on until one point for eighth place. Teams or athletes that do not finish or are disqualified do not receive points.

Edition	1st place, gold medalist(s)	2nd place, silver medalist(s)	3rd place, bronze medalist(s)	4	5	6	7	8
1906	-	-	-	-	1	-	-	-
1908	-	1	-	-	-	-	-	-
1912	-	-	1	-	1	-	-	-
1920	2	-	2	1	1	-	2	-
1924	1	1	-	1	-	1	3	1
1928	-	-	-	1	-	2	-	-
1932	1	-	2	-	2	1	1	1
1936	1	2	2	3	-	1	1	-
1948	1	3	1	-	-	1	1	1
1952	1	1	-	-	-	1	-	2
1956	-	-	-	2	2	2	-	-
1960	1	-	2	1	1	2	2	-
1964	1	-	1	1	1	1	2	2
1968	-	-	2	-	-	2	2	1
1972	-	-	2	-	-	1	1	2
1976	-	1	-	1	-	4	-	4
1980	3	-	1	1	1	1	1	2
1984	3	1	3	4	4	2	2	1
1988	1	1	1	2	1	1	3	2
1992	-	-	1	3	2	1	1	-
1996	-	2	2	2	1	1	-	-
2000	-	2	-	1	1	1	2	1
2004	2	-	1	-	-	1	1	-
2008	1	-	1	-	2	-	1	-
2012	-	-	1	1	1	-	2	-
2016	-	-	-	1	2	-	1	1
2020	5	0	0	0	1	0	2	2
	24	15	26	26	25	27	31	23

== Medals ==
Women's medals

19 of the 68 medals come from race walk.

Edition	Gold	Silver	Bronze	Total
(United Kingdom) London 1908		800 metres Emilio Lunghi		1
(Sweden) Stockholm 1912			10 km walk Fernando Altimani	1
(Belgium) Antwerp 1920	3 km walk Ugo Frigerio			4
(Belgium) Antwerp 1920	10 km walk Ugo Frigerio			4
(Belgium) Antwerp 1920			3000 metres steeplechase Ernesto Ambrosini	4
(Belgium) Antwerp 1920			Marathon; Valerio Arri	4
(France) Paris 1924	3 km walk Ugo Frigerio			2
(France) Paris 1924		Marathon; Romeo Bertini		2
(United States) Los Angeles 1932	1500 metres Luigi Beccali			3
(United States) Los Angeles 1932			4X100 metres relay Giuseppe Castelli; Gabriele Salviati; Ruggero Maregatti; Edgardo Toetti	3
(United States) Los Angeles 1932			50 km walk Ugo Frigerio	3
(Nazi Germany) Berlin 1936		800 metres Mario Lanzi		5
(Nazi Germany) Berlin 1936			1500 metres Luigi Beccali	5
(Nazi Germany) Berlin 1936		4X100 metres relay Orazio Mariani; Gianni Caldana; Elio Ragni; Tullio Gonnelli		5
(Nazi Germany) Berlin 1936			Discus throw Giorgio Oberweger	5
(Nazi Germany) Berlin 1936	100 metres hurdles Ondina Valla			5
(United Kingdom) London 1948			4X100 metres relay Michele Tito; Enrico Perucconi; Carlo Monti; Antonio Siddi	5
(United Kingdom) London 1948	Discus throw Adolfo Consolini	Discus throw Giuseppe Tosi		5
(United Kingdom) London 1948		Shot put Amelia Piccinini		5
(United Kingdom) London 1948		Discus throw Edera Cordiale		5
(Finland) Helsinki 1952	50 km walk Pino Dordoni			2
(Finland) Helsinki 1952		Discus throw Adolfo Consolini		2
(Italy) Rome 1960	200 metres Livio Berruti			3
(Italy) Rome 1960			50 km walk Abdon Pamich	3
(Italy) Rome 1960			100 metres Giuseppina Leone	3
(Japan) Tokyo 1964			400 metres hurdles Salvatore Morale	2
(Japan) Tokyo 1964	50 km walk Abdon Pamich			2
Mexico City 1968			110 metres hurdles Eddy Ottoz	2
Mexico City 1968			Triple jump Giuseppe Gentile	2
(West Germany) Munich 1972			200 metres Pietro Mennea	2
(West Germany) Munich 1972			1500 metres Paola Pigni	2
(Canada) Montreal 1976		High jump Sara Simeoni		1
(Soviet Union) Moscow 1980	200 metres Pietro Mennea			4
(Soviet Union) Moscow 1980			4x400 metres relay Roberto Tozzi; Mauro Zuliani; Stefano Malinverni; Pietro Mennea	4
(Soviet Union) Moscow 1980	20 km walk Maurizio Damilano			4
(Soviet Union) Moscow 1980	High jump Sara Simeoni			4
(United States) Los Angeles 1984	10000 metres Alberto Cova			7
(United States) Los Angeles 1984			20 km walk Maurizio Damilano	7
(United States) Los Angeles 1984			50 km walk Sandro Bellucci	7
(United States) Los Angeles 1984			Long jump Giovanni Evangelisti	7
(United States) Los Angeles 1984	Shot put Alessandro Andrei			7
(United States) Los Angeles 1984	1500 metres Gabriella Dorio			7
(United States) Los Angeles 1984		High jump Sara Simeoni		7
(South Korea) Seoul 1988		10000 metres Salvatore Antibo		3
(South Korea) Seoul 1988	Marathon; Gelindo Bordin			3
(South Korea) Seoul 1988			20 km walk Maurizio Damilano	3
(Spain) Barcelona 1992			20 km walk Giovanni De Benedictis	1
(United States) Atlanta 1996			3000 metres steeplechase Alessandro Lambruschini	4
(United States) Atlanta 1996			5000 metres Roberta Brunet	4
(United States) Atlanta 1996		10 km walk Elisabetta Perrone		4
(United States) Atlanta 1996		Long jump Fiona May		4
(Australia) Sydney 2000		Hammer throw Nicola Vizzoni		2
(Australia) Sydney 2000		Long jump Fiona May		2
(Greece) Athens 2004	Marathon; Stefano Baldini			3
(Greece) Athens 2004	20 km walk Ivano Brugnetti			3
(Greece) Athens 2004			Pole vault Giuseppe Gibilisco	3
(China) Beijing 2008	50 km walk Alex Schwazer			2
(China) Beijing 2008			20 km walk Elisa Rigaudo	2
(United Kingdom) London 2012			Triple jump Fabrizio Donato	1
(Brazil) Rio de Janeiro 2016				0
(Japan) Tokyo 2020	100 m Marcell Jacobs			5
(Japan) Tokyo 2020	High jump Gianmarco Tamberi			5
(Japan) Tokyo 2020	20 km walk Massimo Stano			5
(Japan) Tokyo 2020	20 km walk Antonella Palmisano			5
(Japan) Tokyo 2020	4×100 m relay Lorenzo Patta; Marcell Jacobs; Fausto Desalu; Filippo Tortu			5
(France) Paris 2024		10,000 metres Nadia Battocletti	Triple jump Andy Diaz	3
(France) Paris 2024			Long jump Mattia Furlani	3
	24	16	28	68

== Results by event ==
Event	No. of appearances	First appearance	First medal	First gold medal	Gold	Silver	Bronze	Total	Best finish
Men's 100 metres	19/29	1900	2020	2020	1	0	0	1	(gold) (2020)
Men's 400 metres	17/28	1900	—N/a	—N/a	0	0	0	0	8th (1912, 1936)

== See also ==
- Athletics at the Summer Olympics
- Athletics in Italy
- Italy national athletics team
- Italy at the Summer Olympics
