= Italy at the Summer Olympics =

Italian delegation to sporting event

- Flag of Italy
- IOC code: ITA
- NOC: Italian National Olympic Committee
- Medals Ranked 6th: Gold 229 Silver 201 Bronze 228 Total 658

Summer Olympics appearances (overview)
- 1896; 1900; 1904; 1908; 1912; 1920; 1924; 1928; 1932; 1936; 1948; 1952; 1956; 1960; 1964; 1968; 1972; 1976; 1980; 1984; 1988; 1992; 1996; 2000; 2004; 2008; 2012; 2016; 2020; 2024

Other related appearances
- 1906 Intercalated Games

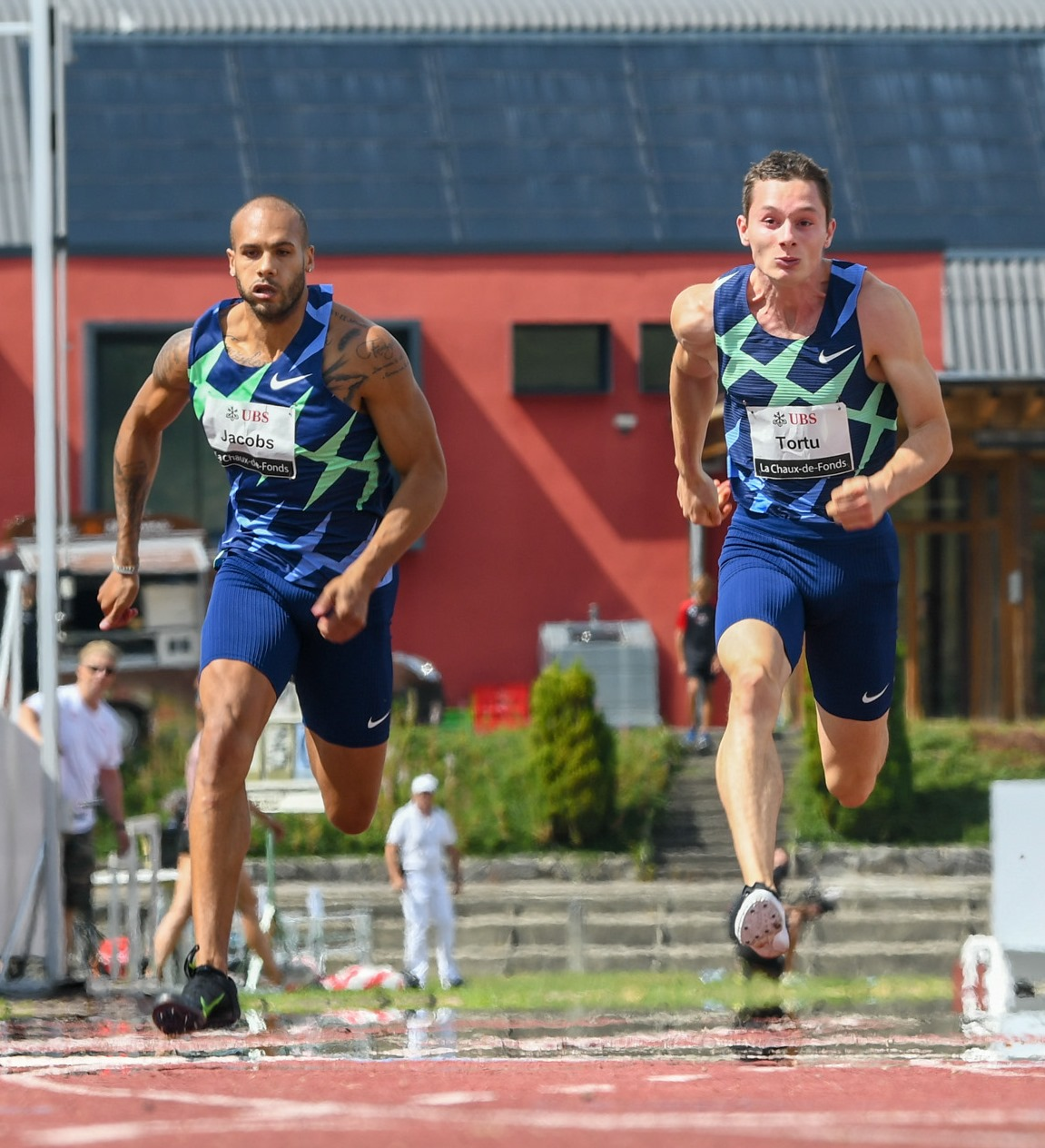
Marcell Jacobs and Filippo Tortu, gold with the 4 × 100 m relay team at Tokyo 2020.

Italy has sent athletes to every celebration of the modern Summer Olympic Games, with the uncertain exception of the 1904 Summer Olympics where one Italian may have competed. The Italian National Olympic Committee (CONI) is the National Olympic Committee for Italy.

== Medals ==
Games	Athletes	Gold	Silver	Bronze	Total	Rank
(Kingdom of Greece) 1896 Athens	1	0	0	0	0	–
(French Third Republic) 1900 Paris	24	3	2	0	5	8
(United States) 1904 St. Louis	1^{[a]}	0	0	0	0	–
(United Kingdom) 1908 London	68	2	2	0	4	9
(Sweden) 1912 Stockholm	61	3	1	2	6	11
(Belgium) 1920 Antwerp	174	13	5	5	23	7
(French Third Republic) 1924 Paris	200	8	3	5	16	5
(Netherlands) 1928 Amsterdam	174	7	5	7	19	5
(United States) 1932 Los Angeles	112	12	12	12	36	2
(Nazi Germany) 1936 Berlin	243	8	9	5	22	4
(United Kingdom) 1948 London	213	8	11	8	27	5
(Finland) 1952 Helsinki	231	8	9	4	21	5
(Australia) 1956 Melbourne	129	8	8	9	25	5
(Italy) 1960 Rome	280	13	10	13	36	3
(Japan) 1964 Tokyo	168	10	10	7	27	5
1968 Mexico City	167	3	4	9	16	13
(West Germany) 1972 Munich	224	5	3	10	18	10
(Canada) 1976 Montreal	210	2	7	4	13	14
(Soviet Union) 1980 Moscow	159	8	3	4	15	5
(United States) 1984 Los Angeles	268	14	6	12	32	5
(South Korea) 1988 Seoul	253	6	4	4	14	10
(Spain) 1992 Barcelona	304	6	5	8	19	12
(United States) 1996 Atlanta	340	13	10	12	35	6
(Australia) 2000 Sydney	361	13	8	13	34	7
(Greece) 2004 Athens	364	10	11	11	32	8
(China) 2008 Beijing	344	8	9	10	27	9
(United Kingdom) 2012 London	285	8	9	11	28	9
(Brazil) 2016 Rio de Janeiro	314	8	12	8	28	9
(Japan) 2020 Tokyo	372	10	10	20	40	10
(France) 2024 Paris	402	12	13	15	40	9
(United States) 2028 Los Angeles	future event					
(Australia) 2032 Brisbane	future event					
Total (30/30)	6,446	229	201	228	658	6

- ^{a} Cyclist Frank Bizzoni, who immigrated from Italy to the United States but still was an Italian citizen in 1904, was disputed and not recognized by the International Olympic Committee until the 21st century.

== Medals by sport ==
Update to Tokyo 2020.

Leading in that sport

Sport	Gold	Silver	Bronze	Total
Fencing	50	49	36	135
Cycling	36	17	13	66
Athletics	24	16	29	69
Shooting	17	18	12	47
Boxing	15	15	18	48
Gymnastics	15	8	12	35
Rowing	11	16	16	43
Equestrian	7	9	7	23
Swimming	7	8	20	35
Canoeing	7	8	4	19
Wrestling	7	4	11	22
Sailing	6	3	8	17
Weightlifting	5	5	8	18
Judo	5	4	9	18
Water polo	4	3	3	10
Diving	3	5	3	11
Archery	2	3	4	9
Modern pentathlon	2	2	4	8
Taekwondo	2	1	2	5
Volleyball	1	3	3	7
Football	1	0	2	3
Tennis	1	0	2	3
Karate	1	0	1	2
Basketball	0	2	0	2
Beach volleyball	0	1	0	1
Totals (25 entries)	229	200	227	656

== Athletes with most appearances ==
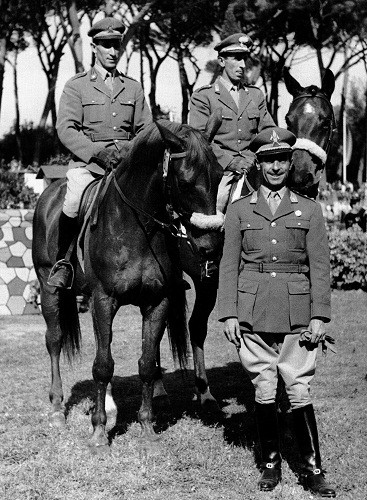
Piero (left on the horse) and Raimondo D'Inzeo (right on the horse).

Source the website Olympedia.

Still active

#	Athlete	Birth/death	Games	Period (age)	Sport	App.
1	Piero D'Inzeo	1923–2014	1948–1976	28 years (25/53)	Equestrian	8
1	Raimondo D'Inzeo	1925–2013	1948–1976	28 years (23/51)	Equestrian	8
1	Giovanni Pellielo	1970	1992–2016, 2024	32 years (22/54)	Shooting	8
4	Andrea Benelli	1960	1988–2008	20 years (28/48)	Shooting	6
4	Marco De Nicolo	1976	2000–2020	21 years (23/45)	Shooting	6
4	Ilario Di Buò	1956	1984–1992, 2000–2008	24 years (27/51)	Archery	6
4	Josefa Idem (Note: She has participated in a total of 8 Olympic Games, having represented Germany in Los Angeles 1984 and Seoul 1988.)	1964	1992–2012	20 years (28/48)	Canoeing	6
4	Angelo Mazzoni	1961	1980–2000	20 years (19/39)	Fencing	6
4	Alessandra Sensini	1970	1992–2012	20 years (22/42)	Sailing	6

== See also ==
- Italy at the Olympics
  - Italy at the Olympics in athletics
- Italy at the Winter Olympics
