= Mohammed Hussain =

Indian field hockey player (1911–1977)

Medal record

Men's field hockey

Representing India

Olympic Games
Gold medal – first place	1936 Berlin	Team

Western Asiatic Games
Gold medal – first place	1934 Delhi	

Mohammed Hussain (1 October 1911 – 28 February 1977) was an Indian field hockey and soccer player who competed in the hockey tournament the 1936 Summer Olympics. He belonged to the Beary society, whose mother tongue was Beary Bashe. He was the captain for the hockey club Manavadar, which was then a British protectorate. Hussein worked for the Prince of Manavadar. and also represented India against South Africa in soccer in 1934.

He was described by Krishan Datta in the Times of India as "A reliable full-back, Mohammed Hussain enjoyed the trust of his captain in the final against Germany. A 'stout' defender and a 'wall' in the defence, Hussain hailed from the princely state of Manavadar which produced a sprinkling of Olympians."

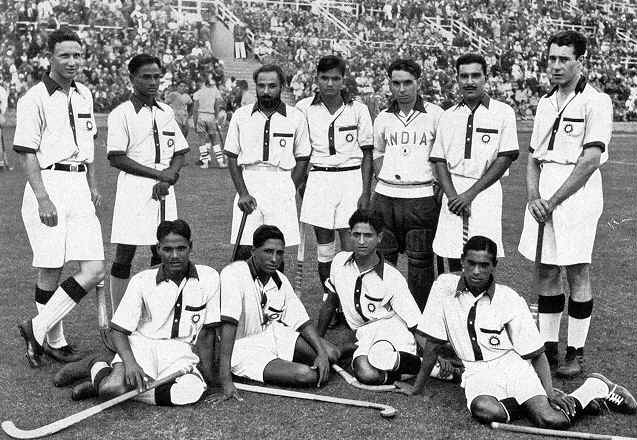
Hussain (standing at far left) was in the 1936 Berlin Olympics final which won the Gold against Germany 8–1.

He was a member of the Indian field hockey team, which won the gold medal. His position was full-back. He played four matches (of five matches played in total) including both the semifinal match against France and the final match against Germany. He was then 24 years old.

He was the captain of the Prince of Manavadar's Team which toured New Zealand in 1938.

== Practice matches for the Olympics ==
=== Practice matches in Northern India ===
India played her first game of the Indian tour against Delhi Select XI. India lost 1–4, even though Delhi XI was never considered a great team. The unexpected win is sometimes blamed on Sardar Mohammed Hussain for playing as inside-right, a position in which he had never played before. India won the next two matches against Jhansi Heroes and Bhopal State XI easily.

=== Practice matches in Northern India ===
India won the three matches against Madras Indians, All Madras and Bangalore without any problem. Hussain played in all these matches.

=== Pre-Olympic practice matches in Germany ===
India played eight practice matches before the Olympics. Hussain played in five of those matches. India remained undefeated.

== Olympic matches ==
Hussain played against Hungary. He was rested in the next match against the US. India had easy wins against Japan and France later. He was part of both the matches. After the match he and the team were guests of the Berlin Mosque Committee with an invitation to take tea with the members. A long speech tracing the history of the Olympic Games and India's part therein was given by the President, and translated afterwards into the German and Arabic languages. India won the final against Germany's team 8–1.
