= Bullet Bob =

Bullet Bob may refer to:

- Bob Armstrong (1939–2020), American professional wrestler
- Bob Feller (1918–2010), American baseball pitcher
- Bob Gibson (1935–2020), American baseball pitcher
- Bob Hayes (1942–2002), American sprinter and football wide receiver
- Bob Kiesel (1911–1993), American sprinter
- Bob Turley (1930–2013), American baseball pitcher
- Bob Westfall (1919–1980), American football fullback
