= Athletics at the 1932 Summer Olympics – Men's 4 × 100 metres relay =

Men's 4 × 100 metres relay at the Games of the X Olympiad
- Venue: Los Angeles Memorial Coliseum
- Dates: August 6 and August 7, 1932

Medalists
1st place, gold medalist(s)		Bob Kiesel; Emmett Toppino; Hec Dyer; Frank Wykoff; United States
2nd place, silver medalist(s)		Helmut Körnig; Fritz Hendrix; Erich Borchmeyer; Arthur Jonath; Germany
3rd place, bronze medalist(s)		Giuseppe Castelli; Ruggero Maregatti; Gabriele Salviati; Edgardo Toetti; Italy

The men's 4 × 100 metres relay event at the 1932 Summer Olympics took place on August 6 and August 7 at the Los Angeles Memorial Coliseum.

== Results ==
=== Heats ===
Two heats were held; the fastest three times advanced to the final round.

Heat one

Rank	Name	Nationality	Time	Notes
1	Helmut Körnig; Fritz Hendrix; Erich Borchmeyer; Arthur Jonath	Germany	41.22	Q
2	Takayoshi Yoshioka; Chuhei Nanbu; Izu Anno; Itaro Nakajima	Japan	41.8	Q
3	Don Finlay; Stanley Fuller; Stanley Engelhart; Ernie Page	Great Britain	42.0	Q
4	Angelos Lambrou; Khristos Mantikas; Evangelos Moiropoulos; Renos Frangoudis	Greece	42.9	
5	Bunoo Sutton; Ronald Vernieux; Mehar Chand Dhawan; Dickie Carr	India	43.7	

Heat Two

Rank	Name	Nationality	Time	Notes
1	Bob Kiesel; Emmett Toppino; Hec Dyer; Frank Wykoff	United States	40.61	WR, Q
2	Giuseppe Castelli; Ruggero Maregatti; Gabriele Salviati; Edgardo Toetti	Italy	42.8	Q
3	Percy Williams; Jim Brown; Harold Wright; Bert Pearson	Canada	45.0	Q

=== Final ===
Rank	Name	Nationality	Time	Notes
1st place, gold medalist(s)	Bob Kiesel; Emmett Toppino; Hec Dyer; Frank Wykoff	United States	40.0	WR
2nd place, silver medalist(s)	Helmut Körnig; Fritz Hendrix; Erich Borchmeyer; Arthur Jonath	Germany	40.9	
3rd place, bronze medalist(s)	Giuseppe Castelli; Ruggero Maregatti; Gabriele Salviati; Edgardo Toetti	Italy	41.2	
4	Percy Williams; Jim Brown; Harold Wright; Bert Pearson	Canada	41.3	
5	Takayoshi Yoshioka; Chuhei Nanbu; Izuo Anno; Itaro Nakajima	Japan	41.3	
6	Don Finlay; Stanley Fuller; Stanley Engelhart; Ernie Page	Great Britain	41.4	

Key: WR = world record; DNF = did not finish
