= Italy at the Winter Olympics =

- Flag of Italy
- IOC code: ITA
- NOC: Italian National Olympic Committee
- Medals Ranked 10th: Gold 52 Silver 49 Bronze 70 Total 171

Winter Olympics appearances (overview)
- 1924; 1928; 1932; 1936; 1948; 1952; 1956; 1960; 1964; 1968; 1972; 1976; 1980; 1984; 1988; 1992; 1994; 1998; 2002; 2006; 2010; 2014; 2018; 2022; 2026

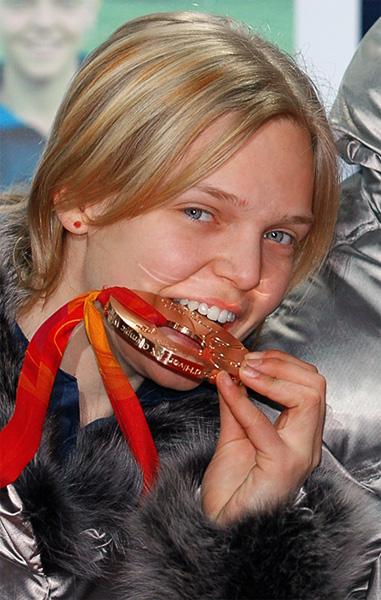
Arianna Fontana, the most decorated Italian athlete at the Winter Olympics, with fourteen medals in short track.

Italy has sent athletes to every celebration of the modern Winter Olympic Games. The Italian National Olympic Committee (CONI) is the National Olympic Committee for Italy.

Italy has participated in all Olympic Winter Games from 1924 to 2026, securing a total of 171 medals, including 52 gold medals. The country has excelled in various sports disciplines, with many achievements in cross-country skiing (38 medals, nine of which are gold), Alpine skiing (41 medals, 16 of which are gold) and luge (22 medals, nine of which are gold). Among the Italian Winter Olympians, only Alberto Tomba and Deborah Compagnoni have achieved the feat of winning three gold medals in Alpine skiing.

== Medals ==
Best rank in medal table

*Red border color indicates tournament was held on home soil.

In bold maximum number of medals won by color.

Games	Athletes	**Gold**	**Silver**	**Bronze**	Total	Rank
1924 Chamonix	23	0	0	0	**0**	–
1928 St. Moritz	13	0	0	0	**0**	–
1932 Lake Placid	12	0	0	0	**0**	–
1936 Garmisch-Partenkirchen	40	0	0	0	**0**	–
1948 St. Moritz	57	1	0	0	**1**	10
1952 Oslo	33	1	0	1	**2**	6
1956 Cortina d'Ampezzo	65	1	2	0	**3**	8
1960 Squaw Valley	28	0	0	1	**1**	14
1964 Innsbruck	61	0	1	3	**4**	12
1968 Grenoble	52	4	0	0	**4**	4
1972 Sapporo	44	2	2	1	**5**	8
1976 Innsbruck	58	1	2	1	**4**	10
1980 Lake Placid	46	0	2	0	**2**	13
1984 Sarajevo	74	2	0	0	**2**	10
1988 Calgary	58	2	1	2	**5**	10
1992 Albertville	107	4	6	4	**14**	6
1994 Lillehammer	104	7	5	8	**20**	4
1998 Nagano	113	2	6	2	**10**	10
2002 Salt Lake City	112	4	4	5	**13**	7
2006 Turin	185	5	0	6	**11**	9
2010 Vancouver	114	1	1	3	**5**	16
2014 Sochi	113	0	2	6	**8**	22
2018 Pyeongchang	120	3	2	5	**10**	12
2022 Beijing	118	2	**7**	8	**17**	13
2026 Milano Cortina	**196**	**10**	6	**14**	**30**	4
2030 French Alps						
2034 Utah						
Total		52	49	70	171	10

== Medals by sport ==
Update to Milano Cortina 2026.

Leading in that sport

Sport	Gold	Silver	Bronze	Total
Alpine skiing	16	12	13	41
Cross-country skiing	9	14	15	38
Luge	9	4	9	22
Speed skating	5	1	6	12
Short track speed skating	4	8	7	19
Bobsleigh	4	4	4	12
Snowboarding	1	3	4	8
Biathlon	1	2	6	9
Freestyle skiing	1	1	1	3
Curling	1	0	1	2
Skeleton	1	0	0	1
Figure skating	0	0	3	3
Nordic combined	0	0	1	1
Totals (13 entries)	52	49	70	171

== See also ==
- Italy at the Olympics
  - Italy at the Olympics in athletics
- Italy at the Summer Olympics
- Italy at the Winter Paralympics
