= Western Asiatic Games =

Multi-sport event

The Western Asiatic Games was a multi-sport event for athletes from Western Asia. The games were established since as a replacement to the Far Eastern Games, which were cancelled due to the political difficulties between China and Japan. The games were suggested and organized by the IOC member in India, Guru Dutt Sondhi.

The scope of the Games comprised all the countries east of Suez and west of Singapore. The first and only edition of the games was celebrated in Delhi, India from 27 February to 3 March 1934. A second event was planned to be held in Palestine Mandate, however the games were cancelled due to the armed conflict in the region.

The Asian Games was later launched as a successor competition and, at a more narrow regional level, the West Asian Games emerged to fulfil the position of an event for West Asia.

== 1934 Western Asiatic Games ==
The First Western Asiatic Games was celebrated in Delhi between 27 February and 3 March 1934 at the Irwin Amphitheater. Four countries—Afghanistan, British India, Palestine Mandate and Ceylon—participated. The participants competed in athletics, aquatic sports, including swimming and diving, and field hockey.

=== Results ===
==== Athletics ====
Athletics was contested at the Irwin Amphitheater, New Delhi from 2 to 3 March.

Event	Gold		Silver		Bronze	
100 yards	R.A. Vernieux; India (IND)	9.7	E.S. Whiteside; India (IND)		Mohamed Khan; Afghanistan (AFG)	
220 yards	E.S. Whiteside; India (IND)	22.5	Theodore Levy; Mandatory Palestine (PAL)	23.4	Shlomoh Meranz; Mandatory Palestine (PAL)	23.8
880 yards	G.P. Bhalla; India (IND)	2:03.5	D.I. Colonne; Ceylon (CEY)		Chengappa; India (IND)	
1 mile	N. Mathews; Ceylon (CEY)	4:41.8	Harcharn Singh; India (IND)		Walter Frankl; Mandatory Palestine (PAL)	
3 Miles	Kishen Singh; India (IND)	15:22.6	Walter Frankl; Mandatory Palestine (PAL)	16:23.4	Gujjar Singh; India (IND)	
6 Miles	Gujjar Singh; India (IND)	32:33.5	Babu Ram; India (IND)		Walter Frankl; Mandatory Palestine (PAL)	36:37.4
440 Yards Hurdles	M. Asghar; India (IND)	1:00.0	Latif Mohammed; India (IND)		Mohammed Khan; Afghanistan (AFG)	
Shot Put	Cyril Cl. Dissanayake; Ceylon (CEY)	41 ft 8 5/8 in (12.716 m)	Ahmed Zahur; India (IND)		Dov Rabinovich; Mandatory Palestine (PAL)	
Long Jump	Niranjan Singh; India (IND)	21 ft 11 3/4 in (6.699 m)	K. Duraisingam; Ceylon (CEY)		McGowan; India (IND)	
High Jump	R. Francis; India (IND)	5 ft 10 in (1.78 m)	W. W. Tambimuttu; Ceylon (CEY)		Abu Yusuf; India (IND)	
Hop, Step and Jump	Mehar Chand Dhawan; India (IND)	45 ft 5 5/8 in (13.859 m)	Niranjan Singh; India (IND)		Mohamed Khan; Afghanistan (AFG)	
Hammer Throw	M. Ishaq; India (IND)	94 ft 5 in (28.78 m)	Ahmed Khan; Afghanistan (AFG)		Dov Rabinovich; Mandatory Palestine (PAL)	
Discus Throw	E. Whiter; India (IND)	116 ft 3 3/4 in (35.452 m)	Dov Rabinovich; Mandatory Palestine (PAL)		Gurdit Singh; India (IND)	
Javelin Throw	E. Whiter; India (IND)	168 ft 4 3/4 in (51.327 m)	Mehr Chand; India (IND)		R.E. Blaze; Ceylon (CEY)	
Pole Vault	Abdul Shafi; India (IND)	11 ft 5 1/2 in (3.493 m)	Gajinder Singh; India (IND)		W. W. Tambimuttu; Ceylon (CEY)	
Relay Race	Ceylon		India		Mandatory Palestine	

==== Aquatics ====
Aquatic sports, including Swimming and Diving were contested at Patiala from February 25 to February 26, 1934.

Event	Gold		Silver	Bronze
110 Yards freestyle	Raja Ram Sawoo; India (IND)	1:12.8	Sushil Bose; India (IND)	Efraim Alfred Guth; Mandatory Palestine (PAL)
220 Yards breaststroke	Darshan Singh; India (IND)	3:57.4	P.K. Bannerjee; India (IND)	
440 Yards freestyle	Nalin Malik; India (IND)	6:26.4	Efraim Alfred Guth; Mandatory Palestine (PAL)	Ghulam Hussain Butt; India (IND)
1 Mile Freestyle	Nalin Malik; India (IND)	28:14.8	Efraim Alfred Guth; Mandatory Palestine (PAL)	
110 Yards backstroke	Bakshi Ranbir; India (IND)	1:39.8	D.I. Holamn; India (IND)	De Khogen; India (IND)
Diving	Rit Mohinder Singh; India (IND)		Sushil Bose; India (IND)	Bashir Ali Shaikh; India (IND)

==== Field hockey ====
Only two countries India and Afghanistan had entered their teams in the field hockey tournament. The only match of the tournament thus also served as the final. The British Indian team defeated Afghanistan 5–0.

2 March 1934

India	5–0	Afghanistan

Irwin Amphitheater

=== Medal table ===
* Host nation (India)

Rank	Nation	Gold	Silver	Bronze	Total
1	India (IND)*	20	13	8	41
2	Ceylon (CEY)	3	3	2	8
3	Mandatory Palestine (PAL)	0	5	7	12
4	Afghanistan (AFG)	0	2	3	5
Totals (4 entries)		23	23	20	66

== See also ==
Other Games celebrated in India:

- 1951 Asian Games
- 1982 Asian Games
- 1987 South Asian Games
- 1995 South Asian Games
- 2016 South Asian Games
