= Oak Grove School, Mussoorie =

Oak Grove School
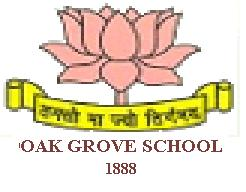
- Jharipani, Mussoorie; Uttarakhand; India

Information
- Type: Residential public school
- Motto: तमसो मा ज्योतिर्गमय (From Darkness to Enlightenment)
- Established: 1 June 1888; 138 years ago
- Founder: East Indian Railway Company
- School board: CBSE
- Principal: Naresh Kumar (IRPS)
- Headmaster of Senior Boys School: Mr Vinay Kumar
- Headmistress of Senior Girls School: Mrs. Kusum Kamboj
- Headmistress of Junior School: Mrs. Archana Sankar
- Teaching staff: 45
- Grades: 3-10
- Age: 7 to 17
- Student to teacher ratio: 15:1
- Language: English
- Campuses: Oak Grove Estate; Jharipani; Mussoorie Hills
- Houses: Patel; Ashoka; Tagore; Shivaji
- Colors: Maroon and White
- Song: Oakgrovian
- Nickname: Oakgrovians
- Team name: Oakgrovians
- Newspaper: Acorn (monthly)
- Yearbook: The Oakgrovian
- Alumni: The Oak Grovian Association
- Website: www.oakgrovejharipani.in
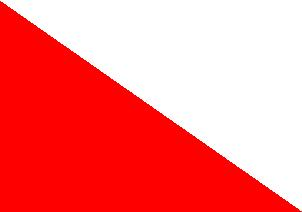
- The Oak Grove Flag

Oak Grove School, Jharipani, Mussoorie is a residential public school, owned and run by the Indian Railways. It is situated on hill tops covering 256 acres (1.04 km^{2}) in Jharipani, Mussoorie, India.

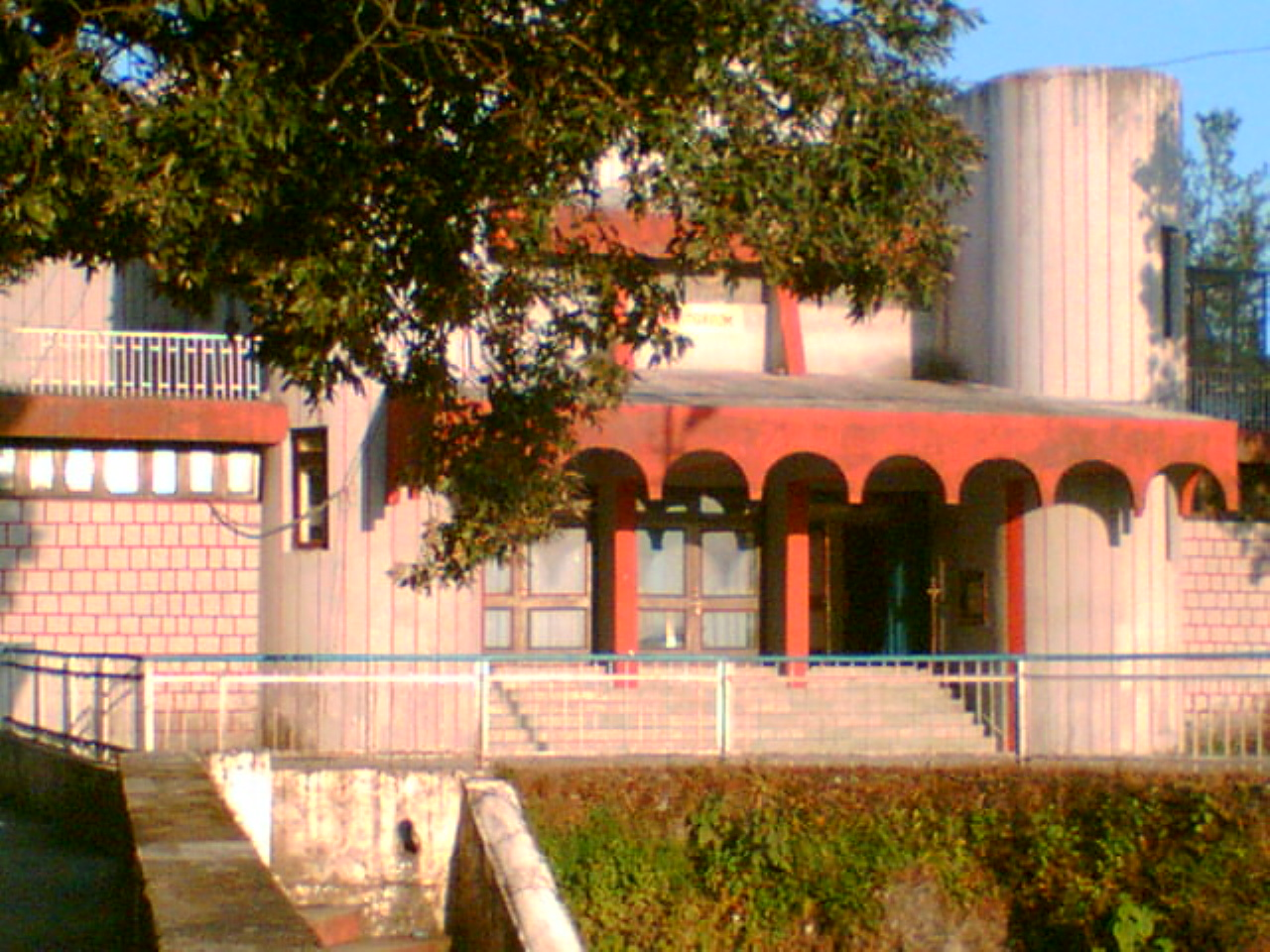
Auditorium

The school was started by the British Raj on 1 June 1888. The students predominantly consist of the children of Indian Railways employees; 25% of seats are reserved for outsiders. At present there are more than 610 students. The school consists of three semi-independent parts — Oak Grove Sr. Boys' School (commenced 1888), Oak Grove Sr. Girls' School (1890s) and Oak Grove Junior School (1912). The buildings were designed by the chief engineer of EIR Mr. Richard Roskell Bayne and are built in Gothic style of architecture. LBSNAA ( Lal Bahadur Shashtri National Academy of Administration) conducted its sports day several times in the valley of Oak Grove School.

== Administration ==
The overall functioning of the school is under the control of a Board of Governors, which frames and reviews policies to ensure smooth and efficient functioning of the institution during its annual meetings. The BOG consists of:

Chairman - General Manager, Northern Railway

Executive Governor - The Chief Personnel Officer, Northern Railway

Member - The Chief Engineer, Northern Railway

Member - The F.A. & C.A.O., Northern Railway

Member - The C.M.D., Northern Railway

Member - The S.D.G.M., Northern Railway

Member - The D.R.M., Northern Railway, Moradabad

Secretary - Principal, Oak Grove School

=== Principals' Timeline ===
Lt. Col. A.C. Chapman	1888 – 1912	24 years
Mr. H.P. Watts	1918 – 1946	28 years
Mr. G.F. Chunn	1946 – 1946	1 year
Mr. O.G. Sullivan	1947 – 1948	2 years
Mr. K.F. McGowan	1948 – 1950	2 years
Mr. B.L.J. Love	1950 – 1956	6 years
Mr. A K. Bhaduri	1956 – 1958	3 years
Mr. B.R. Pasricha	1958 – 1970	13 years
Mr. L.C. Mathur	1970 – 1972	3 years
Mr. Ratan Kumar Kichlu	1972 – 1994	25 years
Mr. Sunil Mishra (Principal designate)	1990 – 1991	2 years
Mrs. Gita Mishra	1995 – 1997	3 years
Mr. Rajiv Kishore	1997 – 2001	4 years
Mr. Deepak Peter Gabriel	2001 – 2004	4 years
Mr. Surinder Kumar	2005 – 2008	4 years
Mr. Anurag Tripathi	2008 – 2012	5 years
Mr. Sandip Trivedi	2012 – 2015	3 years
Mr. J.P. Pandey	2015-2019	5 years
Mr. Abhishek Kesrwani	2019-2022	4 years
Mr.Naresh Kumar	2022-	

== Oakgrovians at the Olympic games ==
Several Oak Grove students represented pre-independence India (under the British Raj) in field hockey at the Olympics between 1928 Amsterdam to 1936 Berlin Olympics, winning Gold medal each time. These were:

Amsterdam Olympics – 1928

- Richard James Allen ^{+} - ^{#} Goalkeeper
- Leslie Charles Hammond
- Broome Eric Pinniger

Los Angeles Olympics – 1932

- Richard James Allen ^{+} - ^{#} Goalkeeper
- Leslie Charles Hammond
- Broome Eric Pinniger
- Richard Carr

Berlin Olympics – 1936

- Richard James Allen ^{+} - ^{#} Goalkeeper
