= Friedrich Hendrix =

German sprinter (1911–1941)

Olympic medal record

Men's athletics
Silver medal – second place	1932 Los Angeles	4 × 100 m relay

Friedrich ("Fritz") Hendrix (6 January 1911 in Aachen – KIA 30 August 1941 in Proletarskaja near Leningrad) was a German athlete who competed mainly in the 100 metres.

He competed for Germany in the 1932 Summer Olympics held in Los Angeles, United States in the 4 × 100 metre relay where he won the silver medal with his team mates Helmut Körnig, Erich Borchmeyer and Arthur Jonath.

He was married fellow sprinter Marie Dollinger who competed in three Olympic Games. Their daughter Brunhilde Hendrix later won a silver medal in the relay at the 1960 Summer Olympics.

He was killed in action during World War II.
