= Italy national athletics team =

National athletics team representing Italy

Italy
- National federation: FIDAL
- Coach: Antonio La Torre
- Nickname: Azzurri (Blues)

Olympic Games
- Appearances: 29
- Medals: (gold) 24 (silver) 16 (bronze) 28

World Championships
- Appearances: 22
- Medals: (gold) 14 (silver) 21 (bronze) 23

World Indoor Championships
- Appearances: 22
- Medals: (gold) 12 (silver) 11 (bronze) 15

European Championships
- Appearances: 26
- Medals: (gold) 55 (silver) 55 (bronze) 56
Medal record
Event	1st	2nd	3rd
Olympic Games	24	16	28
World Championships	14	21	23
World Indoor Championships	12	11	15
European Championships	54	53	57
European Indoor Championships	39	42	35
World Athletics Relays	3	0	1
Total	146	143	159

The Italy national athletics team represents Italy at the international athletics competitions such as Olympic Games or World Athletics championships.

== Competitions ==
The Italian national athletics team participates at senior level, or at least has participated in the past until the same competition ceased to be held, in the following international competitions listed here.

World

1. Olympic Games
2. World Championships
3. World Indoor Championships
4. World Athletics Relays
5. World Athletics Cross Country Championships
6. World Athletics Half Marathon Championships
7. World Athletics Race Walking Team Championships
8. IAAF Continental Cup (Note: Defunct)
9. Universiade
10. World Military Track and Field Championships

Area

1. European Championships
2. European Indoor Championships
3. European Athletics Team Championships (Note: Formerly known as European Cup)
4. European Cross Country Championships
5. European Running Championships
6. European Race Walking Team Championships
7. European Throwing Cup
8. European 10,000m Cup
9. Mediterranean Games

== Medal count ==
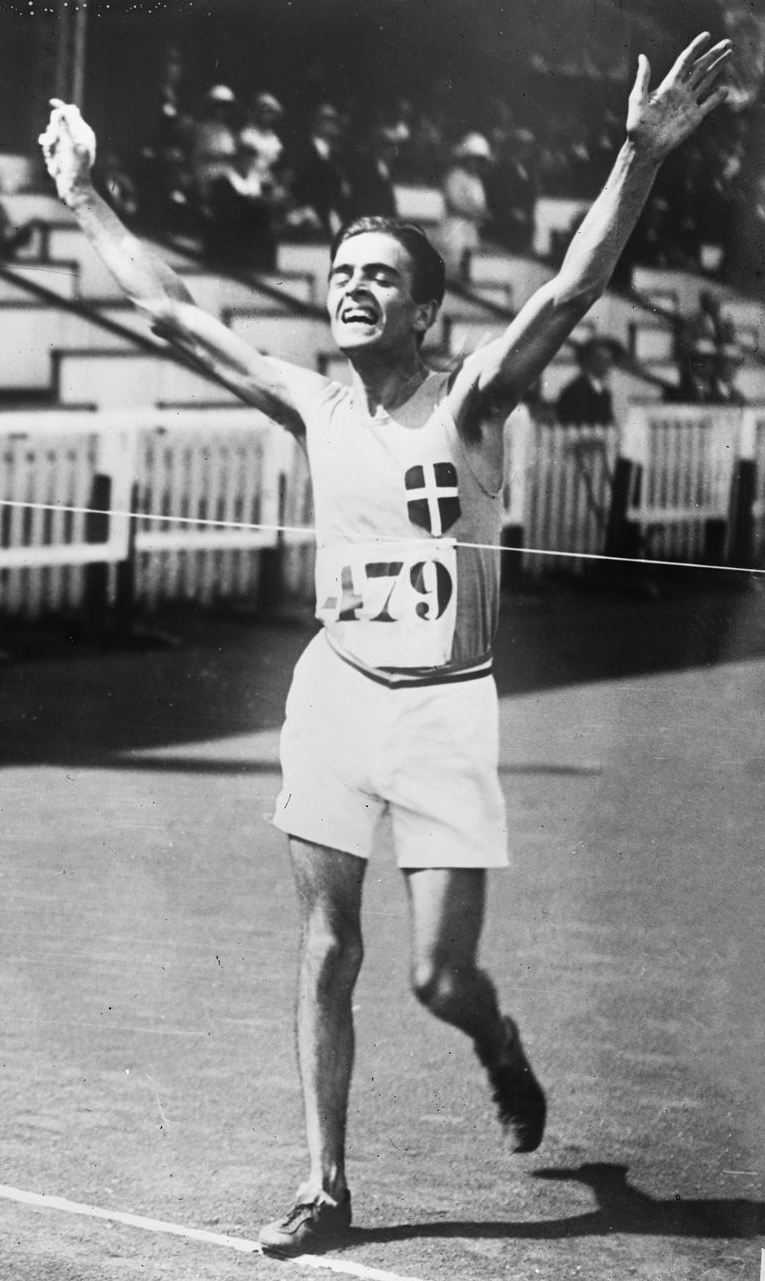
Ugo Frigerio, four medals (three gold), at the Olympic Games

✓ The data for this competition are updated to the latest edition held.

=== Major competitions ===
Event	Participations	1st edition	Last edition	Men				Women				Total				Notes
Event	Participations	1st edition	Last edition	Gold medal	Silver medal	Bronze medal	Tot.	Gold medal	Silver medal	Bronze medal	Tot.	Gold medal	Silver medal	Bronze medal	Tot.	Notes
Olympic Games ✓	29	1896	2024	20	8	24	52	4	8	4	16	24	16	28	68	details
World Championships ✓	22	1983	2025	11	12	11	34	3	9	12	24	14	21	23	58	details
World Indoor Championships ✓	22	1985	2026	8	6	10	24	4	5	5	14	12	11	15	38	details
European Championships ✓	26	1934	2024	43	42	2	117	12	13	24	49	55	55	56	166	details
European Indoor Championships ✓	41	1966	2025	24	27	24	75	15	15	11	41	39	42	35	116	details

=== Other competitions ===
Competition defunct, last edition was in 2018.

Event	Participations	1st edition	Last edition	1st place, gold medalist(s)	2nd place, silver medalist(s)	3rd place, bronze medalist(s)	Total	Notes
World Athletics Relays (Note: Until 2019 it was called IAAF World Relays) ✓	7	2014	2025	3	0	1	4	details
Continental Cup (Note: Until 2006 it was called World Cup) ✓	13	1977	2018	1	9	7	17	details
European Team Championships (Note: Until 2008 it was called European Cup) ✓	28+9 (Note: Participations of Italy at Super League: 25 Men, 13 Women and 9 Unified from 2009.)	1965	2025	52+31	62+38	90+43	316	details (Note: Italy has won the trophy twice (2004, 2025) and is 8th and 6th in the respective EC and ETC medal tables)
World University Games (Note: Until 2019 it was called Universiade) ✓	32	1959	2025	62	47	63	172	details
Mediterranean Games ✓	18	1951	2022	179	161	127	467	details

== Caps ==
Updated at the 2013 Mediterranean Games (29 June 2013).

=== Men ===
Vittorio Visini, with 67 caps, is the Italian athlete with most appearances in the national team of all-time.

	Athlete	Event	Born	Period	Caps			
	Athlete	Event	Born	Period	World Ch.	Olympics	European Ch.	Tot.
1	Vittorio Visini	Racewalking	1945	1965–1981	–	3	5	67
2	Alessandro Andrei	Shot put	1959	1981–1995	4	2	2	63
3	Maurizio Damilano	Racewalking	1957	1977–1991	3	4	4	60
3	Nicola Vizzoni	Hammer throw	1973	1995–2013	9	4	5	60
5	Giovanni Evangelisti	Long jump	1961	1980–1994	3	3	4	59
5	Marco Montelatici	Shot put	1953	1972–1986	–	1	2	59
7	Paolo Dal Soglio	Shot put	1970	1992–2012	5	2	2	58
8	Dario Badinelli	Triple jump	1960	1981–1993	1	1	2	56
9	Pietro Mennea	Sprint	1952-2013	1969–1988	1	5	4	52
9	Sergio Liani	110 metres hurdles	1943	1965–1979	–	2	4	52
9	Silvano Simeon	Discus throw	1945–2010	1966–1982	–	2	4	52
12	Stefano Tilli	Sprint	1962	1983–2000	5	4	4	51
13	Adolfo Consolini	Discus throw	1917–1969	1938–1960	–	4	5	50
14	Armando De Vincentiis	Discus throw	1943	1969–1983	–	2	3	48
14	Pierfrancesco Pavoni	Sprint	1963	1980–1990	2	2	2	51
16	Silvano Meconi	Discus throw	1931	1955–1969	–	3	2	47
16	Renato Dionisi	Pole vault	1947	1964–1978	–	2	2	47
18	Giuseppe Cindolo	Middle distance running	1945	1965–1976	–	4	5	46
19	Fabrizio Donato	Triple jump	1976	2000-	4	5	6	46
20	Sergio Bello	400 metres	1942	1961–1972	–	3	4	45
21	Giampaolo Urlando	Hammer throw	1945	1965–1984	1	3	2	44
22	Abdon Pamich	Racewalking	1933	1954–1973	–	5	6	43
22	Roberto Ribaud	400 metres	1961	1983–1987	2	1	2	43
24	Daniele Fontecchio	110 metres hurdles	1960	1980–1986	1	1	2	42
24	Carlo Lievore	Javelin throw	1937	1956–1971	–	2	3	42
24	Stefano Mei	Middle distance running	1963	1981–1994	2	2	2	42
24	Giovanni De Benedictis	Racewalking	1968	1987–2004	6	5	4	42
28	Livio Berruti	Sprint	1939	1957–1968	–	4	3	41
28	Carlo Mattioli	Racewalking	1954	1978–1991	2	2	2	41
28	Marco Martino	Discus throw	1968	1983–1993	2	1	3	41
28	Gennaro Di Napoli	Middle distance running	1968	1988–2002	4	3	4	41
32	Alessandro Lambruschini	3000 metres steeplechase	1951	1985–1998	4	3	4	40
33	Giuseppe Buttari	110 metres hurdles	1951	1971–1980	–	2	2	39
33	Diego Fortuna	Discus throw	1968	1995–2005	4	2	1	39
33	Sandro Bellucci	Racewalking	1955	1974–1991	3	2	4	39
33	Ennio Preatoni	Sprint	1944	1963–1972	–	3	3	39

=== Women ===
Marisa Masullo (79) and Agnese Maffeis (73) are the Italian women with more appearances.

	Athlete	Event	Born	Period	Caps			
	Athlete	Event	Born	Period	World Ch.	Olympics	European Ch.	Tot.
1	Marisa Masullo	Sprint	1959	1977–1993	3	3	4	79
2	Agnese Maffeis	Shot put and Discus throw	1965	1985–2003	2	3	4	73
3	Sara Simeoni	High jump	1953	1970–1986	4	–	5	67
3	Erica Rossi	400 metres	1955	1974–1989	2	2	2	67
5	Gabriella Dorio	800 m and 1500 m	1957	1973–1991	3	2	3	65
6	Agnese Possamai	Middle distance running	1953	1977–1988	–	–	–	60
7	Antonella Capriotti	Long and Triple jump	1962	1980–1997	3	2	–	55
8	Chiara Rosa	Shot put	1983	2004-2021	5	2	5	52
9	Daniela Ferrian	Sprint	1961	1982–1993	2	1	1	51
10	Donata Govoni	Sprint	1944	1961–1975	-	2	4	49

== Multiple medalists ==
Still active

Athletes in the table have won at least two gold medals. In bold those still active.

#	Athlete	Olympics			World Ch.			World Indoor Ch.			European Ch. (Note: Including European Running Championships)			European Indoor Ch.			Total			
#	Athlete	Gold medal	Silver medal	Bronze medal	Gold medal	Silver medal	Bronze medal	Gold medal	Silver medal	Bronze medal	Gold medal	Silver medal	Bronze medal	Gold medal	Silver medal	Bronze medal	Gold medal	Silver medal	Bronze medal	
1	Marcell Jacobs	2	0	0	0	1	0	1	0	0	3	0	0	1	1	0	**7**	**2**	**0**	9
2	Gianmarco Tamberi	1	0	0	1	0	0	1	0	1	3	0	0	1	1	0	**7**	**1**	**1**	9
3	Sara Simeoni	1	2	0	–	–	–	-	-	-	1	0	2	4	0	0	**6**	**2**	**2**	10
4	Pietro Mennea	1	0	2	0	1	1	0	0	0	3	2	1	1	0	0	**5**	**3**	**4**	12
5	Eddy Ottoz	0	0	1	–	–	–	-	-	-	2	0	0	3	0	0	**5**	**0**	**1**	6
6	Fiona May	0	2	0	2	1	1	1	0	0	0	1	1	1	0	0	**4**	**4**	**2**	10
7	Maurizio Damilano	1	0	2	2	0	0	0	1	0	0	1	0	1	1	0	**4**	**3**	**2**	9
8	Nadia Battocletti	0	1	0	0	1	1	0	1	0	1	0	0	3	0	0	**4**	**2**	**1**	7
9	Annarita Sidoti	0	0	0	1	0	0	0	0	0	2	1	0	1	0	1	**4**	**1**	**1**	6
10	Adolfo Consolini	1	1	0	–	–	–	-	-	-	3	0	0	0	0	0	**4**	**1**	**0**	5
11	Alberto Cova	1	0	0	1	0	0	0	0	0	1	1	0	0	0	0	**3**	**2**	**0**	5
12	Agnese Possamai	0	0	0	0	0	0	0	1	0	0	0	0	3	1	0	**3**	**2**	**0**	5
13	Abdon Pamich	1	0	1	–	–	–	-	-	-	2	1	0	-	-	-	**3**	**1**	**1**	5
14	Gennaro Di Napoli	0	0	0	0	0	0	2	0	0	0	1	0	1	0	0	**3**	**1**	**0**	4
15	Stefano Baldini	1	0	0	0	0	2	0	0	0	2	0	0	0	0	0	**3**	**0**	**2**	6
16	Yeman Crippa	0	0	0	0	0	0	0	0	0	3	0	2	0	0	0	**3**	**0**	**2**	5
17	Ugo Frigerio	3	0	1	–	–	–	-	-	-	–	–	–	-	-	-	**3**	**0**	**1**	6
18	Gelindo Bordin	1	0	0	0	0	1	0	0	0	2	0	0	0	0	0	**3**	**0**	**1**	6
19	Mattia Furlani	0	0	1	1	0	0	1	2	0	1	1	0	0	1	0	**2**	**4**	**1**	7
20	Antonella Palmisano	1	0	0	0	1	2	0	0	0	1	1	0	0	1	0	**2**	**2**	**2**	6
21	Fabrizio Donato	0	0	1	0	0	0	0	0	0	1	0	0	1	2	0	**2**	**2**	**1**	5
22	Francesco Panetta	0	0	0	1	1	0	0	0	0	1	1	0	0	0	0	**2**	**2**	**0**	4
23	Andrew Howe	0	0	0	0	1	0	0	0	1	1	0	0	1	0	0	**2**	**1**	**1**	4
24	Salvatore Antibo	0	1	0	0	0	0	0	0	0	2	0	1	0	0	0	**2**	**1**	**1**	4
25	Stefano Tilli	0	0	0	0	1	0	0	0	0	0	0	1	2	0	0	**2**	**1**	**1**	4
26	Libania Grenot	0	0	0	0	0	0	0	0	0	2	0	3	0	0	0	**2**	**0**	**3**	5
27	Luigi Beccali	1	0	1	–	–	–	-	-	-	1	0	1	-	-	-	**2**	**0**	**2**	4
28	Gabriella Dorio	1	0	0	0	0	0	0	0	0	0	0	1	1	0	0	**2**	**0**	**1**	3
29	Ivano Brugnetti	1	0	0	1	0	0	0	0	0	0	0	0	0	0	0	**2**	**0**	**0**	2
30	Pino Dordoni	1	0	0	0	0	0	-	-	-	1	0	0	-	-	-	**2**	**0**	**0**	2

== Most winning racewalkers ==
#	Athlete	Olympics			World Ch.			World Ind. Ch.			Eur. Ch.			Eur. Ind. Ch.			World Cup			Eur. Cup			Total		
#	Athlete	1st place, gold medalist(s)	2nd place, silver medalist(s)	3rd place, bronze medalist(s)	1st place, gold medalist(s)	2nd place, silver medalist(s)	3rd place, bronze medalist(s)	1st place, gold medalist(s)	2nd place, silver medalist(s)	3rd place, bronze medalist(s)	1st place, gold medalist(s)	2nd place, silver medalist(s)	3rd place, bronze medalist(s)	1st place, gold medalist(s)	2nd place, silver medalist(s)	3rd place, bronze medalist(s)	1st place, gold medalist(s)	2nd place, silver medalist(s)	3rd place, bronze medalist(s)	1st place, gold medalist(s)	2nd place, silver medalist(s)	3rd place, bronze medalist(s)	1st place, gold medalist(s)	2nd place, silver medalist(s)	3rd place, bronze medalist(s)
1	Annarita Sidoti	0	0	0	1	0	0	0	0	0	2	1	0	1	0	1	1	3	1	3	2	0	8	6	2
2	Maurizio Damilano	1	0	2	2	0	0	0	1	0	0	1	0	1	1	0	2	4	2	-	-	-	6	7	4
3	Elisabetta Perrone	0	1	0	0	1	1	0	0	0	0	0	0	0	0	0	1	4	0	3	4	1	4	10	2
4	Erica Alfridi	0	0	0	0	0	0	0	0	0	0	1	1	0	0	0	2	2	1	2	2	0	4	5	2
5	Marco De Luca	0	0	0	0	0	0	0	0	0	0	0	0	0	0	0	2	1	1	2	2	3	4	3	4
6	Abdon Pamich	1	0	1	–	–	–	-	-	-	2	1	0	-	-	-	1	0	3	-	-	-	4	1	4
7	Ivano Brugnetti	1	0	0	1	0	0	0	0	0	0	0	0	0	0	0	0	0	1	1	3	0	3	3	1
8	Antonella Palmisano	1	0	0	0	0	1	0	0	0	0	0	1	0	0	0	0	1	0	2	1	1	3	2	3
9	Matteo Giupponi	0	0	0	0	0	0	0	0	0	0	0	0	0	0	0	2	0	0	1	2	0	3	2	0
10	Ugo Frigerio	3	0	1	–	–	–	-	-	-	–	–	–	-	-	-	-	-	-	-	-	-	3	0	1
11	Rossella Giordano	0	0	0	0	0	0	0	0	0	0	0	0	0	0	0	0	3	0	2	2	0	2	5	0
12	Eleonora Giorgi	0	0	0	0	0	1	0	0	0	0	0	0	0	0	0	0	1	0	2	3	1	2	4	2
13	Sandro Bellucci	0	0	1	0	0	0	0	0	0	0	0	0	0	0	0	2	3	3	-	-	-	2	3	4
14	Giorgio Rubino	0	0	0	0	0	1	0	0	0	0	0	0	0	0	0	0	1	0	2	2	0	2	3	2
15	Carlo Mattioli	0	0	0	0	0	0	0	0	0	0	0	0	0	0	1	2	3	1	-	-	-	2	3	2
16	Pino Dordoni	1	0	0	0	0	0	-	-	-	1	0	0	-	-	-	0	0	1	-	-	-	2	0	1
17	Ileana Salvador	0	0	0	0	1	0	0	0	3	0	0	1	0	3	0	1	2	2	-	-	-	1	6	6
18	Elisa Rigaudo	0	0	1	0	1	0	0	0	0	0	0	1	0	3	0	0	1	0	1	2	2	1	4	4

Where is - he/she never participated because the competition did not exist when he/she was competing. In blod still active athletes.

== Diamond League ==
=== Italian victories ===
- 2021 Diamond League: Gianmarco Tamberi (high jump)
- 2022 Diamond League: Gianmarco Tamberi (high jump)

=== Italian podiums ===
Italian team athletes have reached 28 podiums, including 6 victories in the Diamond League.

Gianmarco Tamberi was the first Italian to win the Diamond League Crown in 2021.

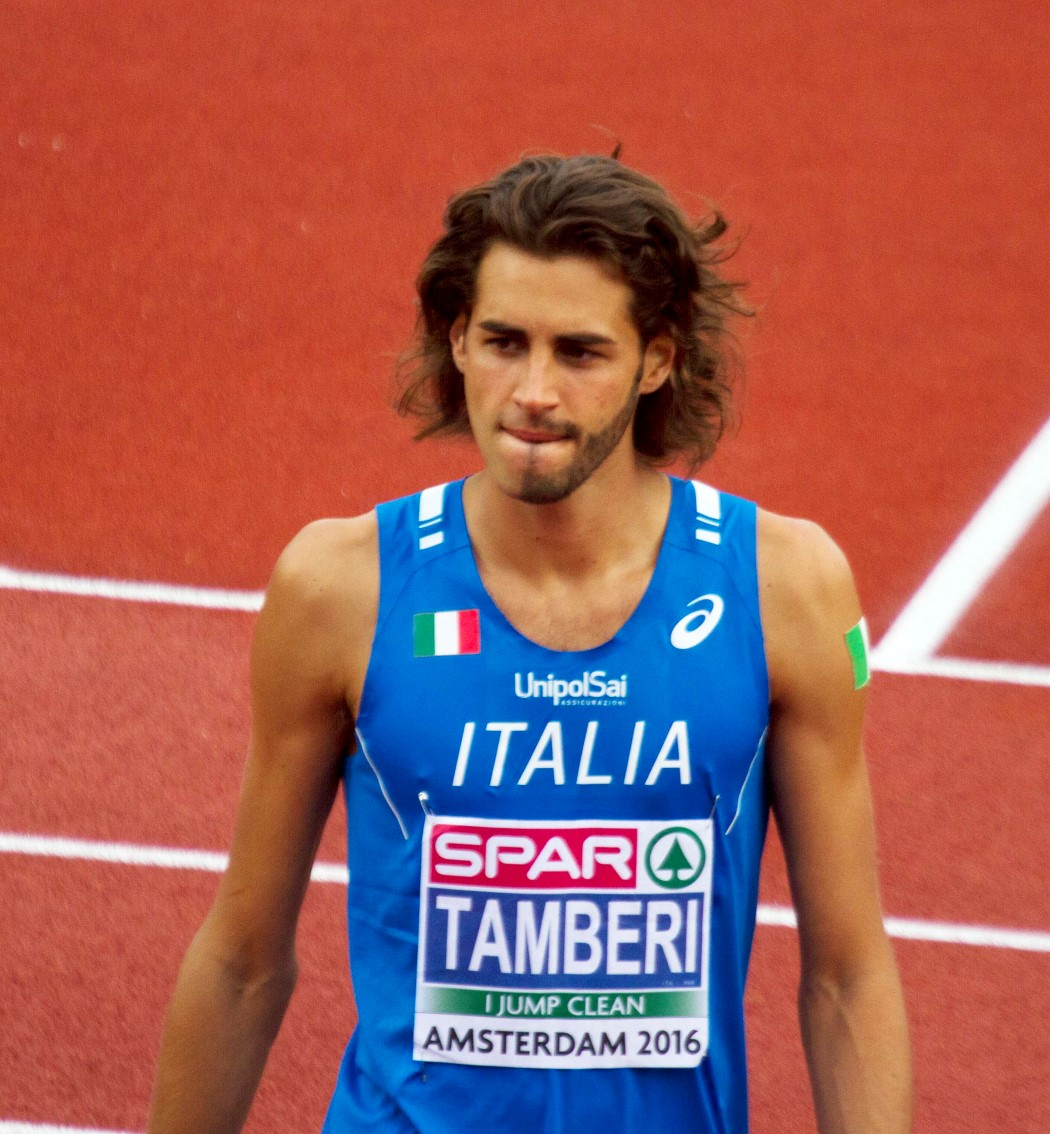
Gianmarco Tamberi last victory for the team in 2016

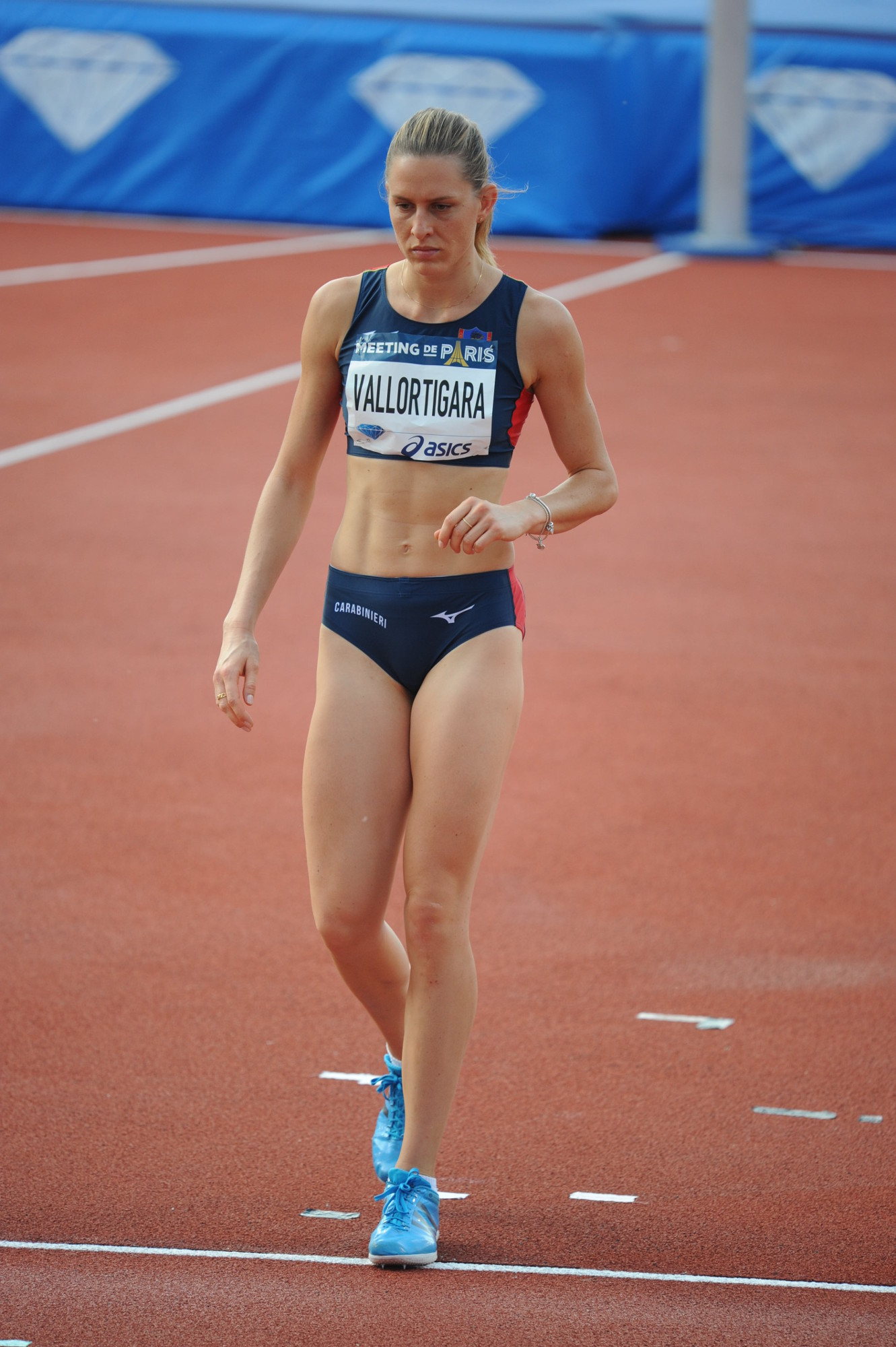
Elena Vallortigara 4th in high jump final standings in 2018
Women results
Finals
Diamond League Crown winner

Edition	Meeting	Gold	Silver	Bronze
2010	(Belgium) Memorial Van Damme		Antonietta Di Martino (high jump, 1.98 m)	
2012	(Switzerland) Weltklasse Zürich	Fabrizio Donato (triple jump, 17.29 m)		
2013	(China) Shanghai Golden Grand Prix			Yadisleidy Pedroso (400 m hs, 54.54)
2013	(Italy) Golden Gala		Daniele Greco (triple jump, 17.04 m)	
2013	(Monaco) Herculis		Daniele Greco (triple jump, 17.25 m)	
2015	(Norway) Bislett Games		Marco Fassinotti (high jump, 2.33 m NR)	
2015	(United Kingdom) London Grand Prix	Marco Fassinotti (high jump, 2.31 m)	Gianmarco Tamberi (high jump, 2.28 m)	
2015	(Sweden) Stockholm Bauhaus Athletics			Gianmarco Tamberi (high jump, 2.29 m)
2016	(Qatar) Doha Diamond League			Marco Fassinotti (high jump, 2.29 m)
2016	(United States) Prefontaine Classic			Alessia Trost (high jump, 1.92 m SB)
2016	(Italy) Golden Gala			Gianmarco Tamberi (high jump, 2.30 m SB)
2016	(Sweden) Stockholm Bauhaus Athletics		Alessia Trost (high jump, 1.90 m)	
2016	(Sweden) Stockholm Bauhaus Athletics			Libania Grenot (400 m, 52.62)
2016	(Monaco) Herculis	Gianmarco Tamberi (high jump, 2.39 m NR)		
2016	(France) Meeting de Paris			Alessia Trost (high jump, 1.93 m SB)
2017	(Morocco) Meeting de Rabat		Gianmarco Tamberi (high jump, 2.27 m)	
2018	(Italy) Golden Gala			Filippo Tortu (100 m, 10.04)
2018	(Italy) Golden Gala			Elena Vallortigara (high jump, 1.94 m)
2018	(United Kingdom) London Grand Prix		Elena Vallortigara (high jump, 2.02 m PB)	
2018	(Belgium) Memorial Van Damme			Gianmarco Tamberi (high jump, 2.31 m)
2018	(Belgium) Memorial Van Damme			Yadisleidy Pedroso (400 m hs, 56.12)
2020	(Sweden) BAUHAUS-galan	Luminosa Bogliolo (100 m ha, 12.88)		
2021	(United Kingdom) Gateshead	Filippo Randazzo (Long jump, 8.11 m (w))		Luminosa Bogliolo (100 m ha, 13.45)
2021	(Sweden) BAUHAUS-galan		Marcell Jacobs (100 m, 10.05)	
2021	(Monaco) Herculis			Marcell Jacobs (100 m, 9.99)
2021	(Switzerland) Weltklasse Zürich	Gianmarco Tamberi (high jump, 2,34 m)		

== Olympic Games ==
Women's medals

21 of the 65 medals came from race walk.

Edition	Gold	Silver	Bronze	Total
(United Kingdom) London 1908		800 metres Emilio Lunghi		1
(Sweden) Stockholm 1912			10 km walk Fernando Altimani	1
(Belgium) Antwerp 1920	3 km walk Ugo Frigerio			4
(Belgium) Antwerp 1920	10 km walk Ugo Frigerio			4
(Belgium) Antwerp 1920			3000 metres steeplechase Ernesto Ambrosini	4
(Belgium) Antwerp 1920			Marathon; Valerio Arri	4
(France) Paris 1924	3 km walk Ugo Frigerio			2
(France) Paris 1924		Marathon; Romeo Bertini		2
(United States) Los Angeles 1932	1500 metres Luigi Beccali			3
(United States) Los Angeles 1932			4X100 metres relay Giuseppe Castelli; Gabriele Salviati; Ruggero Maregatti; Edgardo Toetti	3
(United States) Los Angeles 1932			50 km walk Ugo Frigerio	3
(Nazi Germany) Berlin 1936		800 metres Mario Lanzi		5
(Nazi Germany) Berlin 1936			1500 metres Luigi Beccali	5
(Nazi Germany) Berlin 1936		4X100 metres relay Orazio Mariani; Gianni Caldana; Elio Ragni; Tullio Gonnelli		5
(Nazi Germany) Berlin 1936			Discus throw Giorgio Oberweger	5
(Nazi Germany) Berlin 1936	100 metres hurdles Ondina Valla			5
(United Kingdom) London 1948			4X100 metres relay Michele Tito; Enrico Perucconi; Carlo Monti; Antonio Siddi	5
(United Kingdom) London 1948	Discus throw Adolfo Consolini	Discus throw Giuseppe Tosi		5
(United Kingdom) London 1948		Shot put Amelia Piccinini		5
(United Kingdom) London 1948		Discus throw Edera Cordiale		5
(Finland) Helsinki 1952	50 km walk Pino Dordoni			2
(Finland) Helsinki 1952		Discus throw Adolfo Consolini		2
(Italy) Rome 1960	200 metres Livio Berruti			3
(Italy) Rome 1960			50 km walk Abdon Pamich	3
(Italy) Rome 1960			100 metres Giuseppina Leone	3
(Japan) Tokyo 1964			400 metres hurdles Salvatore Morale	2
(Japan) Tokyo 1964	50 km walk Abdon Pamich			2
Mexico City 1968			110 metres hurdles Eddy Ottoz	2
Mexico City 1968			Triple jump Giuseppe Gentile	2
(West Germany) Munich 1972			200 metres Pietro Mennea	2
(West Germany) Munich 1972			1500 metres Paola Pigni	2
(Canada) Montreal 1976		High jump Sara Simeoni		1
(Soviet Union) Moscow 1980	200 metres Pietro Mennea			4
(Soviet Union) Moscow 1980			4x400 metres relay Roberto Tozzi; Mauro Zuliani; Stefano Malinverni; Pietro Mennea	4
(Soviet Union) Moscow 1980	20 km walk Maurizio Damilano			4
(Soviet Union) Moscow 1980	High jump Sara Simeoni			4
(United States) Los Angeles 1984	10000 metres Alberto Cova			7
(United States) Los Angeles 1984			20 km walk Maurizio Damilano	7
(United States) Los Angeles 1984			50 km walk Sandro Bellucci	7
(United States) Los Angeles 1984			Long jump Giovanni Evangelisti	7
(United States) Los Angeles 1984	Shot put Alessandro Andrei			7
(United States) Los Angeles 1984	1500 metres Gabriella Dorio			7
(United States) Los Angeles 1984		High jump Sara Simeoni		7
(South Korea) Seul 1988		10000 metres Salvatore Antibo		3
(South Korea) Seul 1988	Marathon; Gelindo Bordin			3
(South Korea) Seul 1988			20 km walk Maurizio Damilano	3
(Spain) Barcelona 1992			20 km walk Giovanni De Benedictis	1
(United States) Atlanta 1996			3000 metres steeplechase Alessandro Lambruschini	4
(United States) Atlanta 1996			5000 metres Roberta Brunet	4
(United States) Atlanta 1996		10 km walk Elisabetta Perrone		4
(United States) Atlanta 1996		Long jump Fiona May		4
(Australia) Sydney 2000		Hammer throw Nicola Vizzoni		2
(Australia) Sydney 2000		Long jump Fiona May		2
(Greece) Athens 2004	Marathon; Stefano Baldini			3
(Greece) Athens 2004	20 km walk Ivano Brugnetti			3
(Greece) Athens 2004			Pole vault Giuseppe Gibilisco	3
(China) Beijing 2008	50 km walk Alex Schwazer			2
(China) Beijing 2008			20 km walk Elisa Rigaudo	2
(United Kingdom) London 2012			Triple jump Fabrizio Donato	1
(Brazil) Rio de Janeiro 2016				0
(Japan) Tokyo 2021	100 m Marcell Jacobs			5
(Japan) Tokyo 2021	High jump Gianmarco Tamberi			5
(Japan) Tokyo 2021	20 km walk Massimo Stano			5
(Japan) Tokyo 2021	20 km walk Antonella Palmisano			5
(Japan) Tokyo 2021	4×100 m relay Lorenzo Patta; Marcell Jacobs; Fausto Desalu; Filippo Tortu			5
	24	15	26	65

== Technic commissioners ==
This is the list of technic commissioners of Italy's national athletics team.

- 1933/34: Ove Andersen, Martti Jarvinen, Paavo Karikko, Veikko Renko (men)
- 1935/39: Boyd Comstock (men/women)
- 1946/47: Lidia Bongiovanni (women)
- 1946/61: Giorgio Oberweger (men)
- 1962/63: Lauro Bononcini (men): Augusto Lorenzoni (women)
- 1964/68: Giorgio Oberweger (men/women)
- 1969: Alessandro Calvesi (men): Marcello Pagani (women)
- 1970: Marcello Pagani (men/women)
- 1971/74: Bruno Cacchi (men/ women)
- 1975/86: Enzo Rossi (men); Sandro Giovannelli (women)
- 1987/88: Enzo Rossi (men): Elio Locatelli (women)
- 1989/94: Elio Locatelli (men/women)
- 1995/00: Giampaolo Lenzi (men); Dino Ponchio (women)
- 2001/04: Roberto Frinolli (men); Augusto D’Agostino (women)
- 2005: Nicola Silvaggi (men/women)
- 2008/2012 Francesco Uguagliati (men/women)
- 2013/2016: Massimo Magnani
- 2017/2018: Elio Locatelli (2)
- 2019-: Antonio La Torre

== See also ==
- Athletics in Italy
- Naturalized athletes of Italy
- Italy national relay team
- Italian team at the running events
- Italy at the Olympics
- Italian records in athletics
- FIDAL Hall of Fame
