= Frank Wykoff =

American athlete (1909–1980)

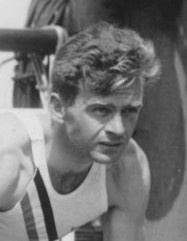

Medal record

Men's athletics

Representing the United States

Olympic Games
Gold medal – first place	1928 Amsterdam	4 × 100 metres relay
Gold medal – first place	1932 Los Angeles	4 × 100 metres relay
Gold medal – first place	1936 Berlin	4 × 100 metres relay

Frank Clifford Wykoff (October 29, 1909 – January 1, 1980) was an American athlete, a triple gold medal winner in 4 × 100 m relay at the Olympic Games.

== Career ==
Born in Des Moines, Iowa, Frank Wykoff has a place in track and field history by being the first man to ever win three Olympic relay gold medals, all in world record time.

Wykoff made his debut at the 1928 Summer Olympics in Amsterdam, where he finished fourth in the 100 m and ran an opening leg in the American 4 × 100 m relay team, which equaled the world record of 41.0 seconds in the final.

After the Olympics, in 1929, Wykoff enrolled at Glendale Community College. He enrolled for one year to be able to train one more season with his Glendale High School coach, Normal Hayhurst. He was close to death the previous fall with a severe throat infection but recovered enough in the spring to tie the world record four times as a sprinter for Glendale. He then transferred to the University of Southern California where he came under the tutelage of the famous coach Dean Cromwell. He won the AAU championships in 100 yd in 1928 and 1931 and the NCAA championships in 100 yd in 1930 and 1931. He ran a new world record in 100 yd of 9.4 s in May, 1930 and repeated it a month later. In 1931, as an anchor of the University of Southern California 4 × 100 m relay team, he helped set a new world record of 40.8. While at USC, Wykoff became a member of the Kappa Alpha Order national fraternity.

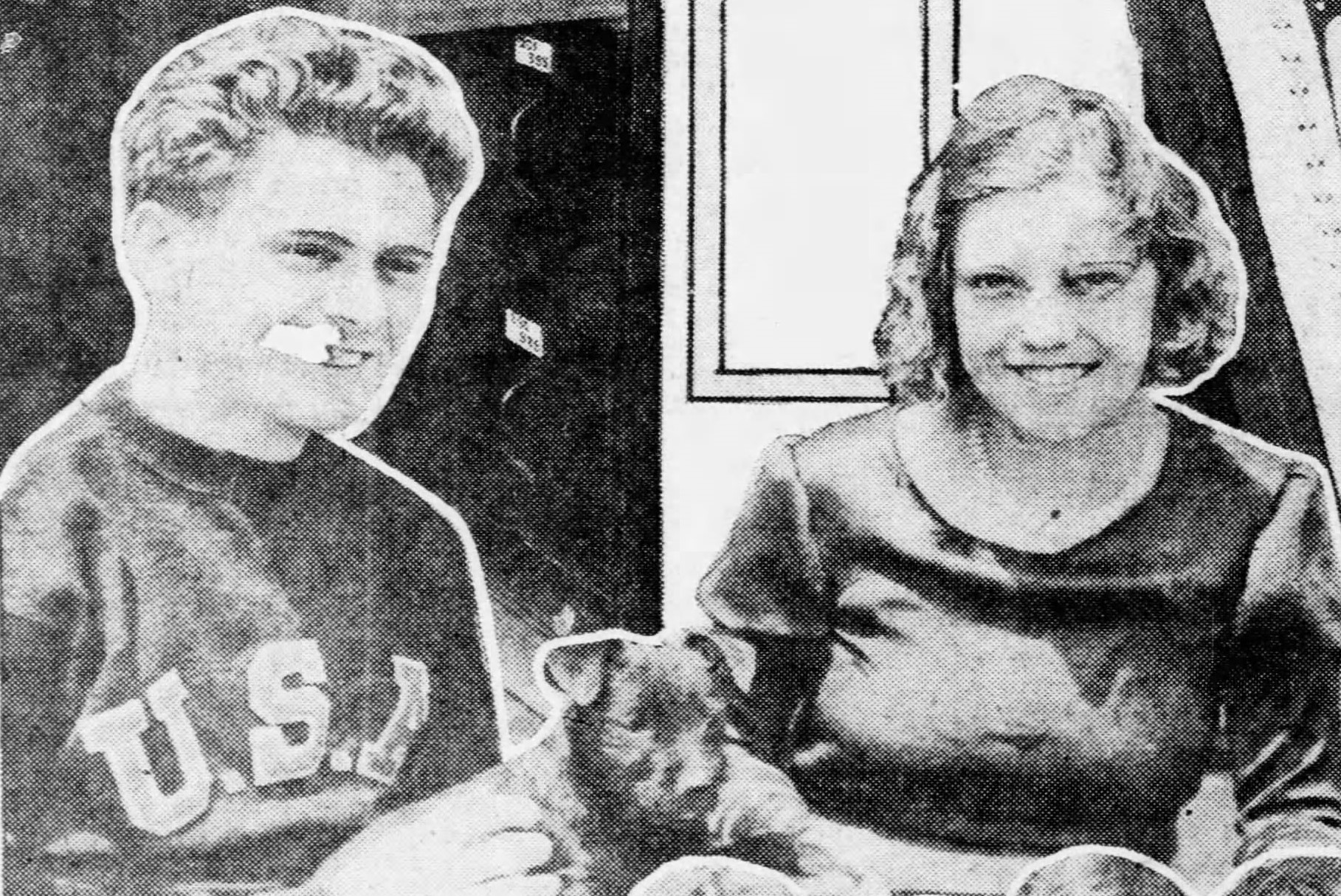
Wykoff and Agnes Weber with the 1932 Summer Olympic mascot dog "Smoky"

At the 1932 Summer Olympics, Wykoff ran the anchor leg for the American 4 × 100 m relay team, which set a new world record of 40.0 seconds. At the 1936 Summer Olympics he again finished fourth in 100 m and again anchored the American 4 × 100 m relay team to gold with a new world record of 39.8.

Following his graduation from USC in 1932 Wykoff earned a master's degree in 1936 and became a teacher and administrator. His early experience in school administration was in Carpinteria, California. He was District Superintendent for the Carpinteria Elementary School system from (at least) 1944 through 1948. Wykoff worked for the Los Angeles County school system until retiring in 1972. He died in Altadena, California, aged 70.

A slogan of Wykoff's, "Clean Speech, Clean Sport, Clean Scholarship, Clean Life", was adopted by the YMCA in 1938.

His medals can be viewed by contacting the LA84 Foundation in Los Angeles, California.
