= Gabriele Salviati =

Italian Olympic sprinter

Personal information
- Nationality: Italian
- Born: March 29, 1910 Bologna, Italy
- Died: October 16, 1987 (aged 77)
- Height: 1.68 m (5 ft 6 in)

Sport
- Country: Italy
- Sport: Athletics
- Event: Sprint
- Club: Virtus Bologna
Medal record
Bronze medal – third place	1932 Los Angeles	4x100 m relay

Gabriele Salviati (March 29, 1910 – October 16, 1987) was an Italian athlete who competed mainly in the 100 metres.

== Biography ==
Salviati competed for Italy in the 1932 Summer Olympics held in Los Angeles, California, in the 4 x 100 metre relay and won the bronze medal with his team mates Giuseppe Castelli, Ruggero Maregatti and Edgardo Toetti.

== Olympic results ==
Year	Competition	Venue	Position	Event	Performance	Notes
1932	Olympic Games	(United States) Los Angeles	3rd	4 × 100 m relay	41.2	

== See also ==
- Italy national relay team
