= Masud Minhas =

Indian field hockey player (1911–1936)

Olympic medal record

Men's field hockey

Representing India
Gold medal – first place	1932 Los Angeles	Team competition

Masud Ali Khan Minhas (1911 – 16 January 1936) was an Indian field hockey player who competed in the 1932 Summer Olympics at Los Angeles.

In 1932, he was a member of the Indian field hockey team, which won the gold medal at the Los Angeles Olympics. He played in both of India's matches in the tournament as right-half.

He was born in Sarikue, India and died of tuberculosis in Calcutta, India sometime in the late 1930s.
