= William Sullivan (field hockey) =

Indian field hockey player (1909–1981)

Medal record

Men's field hockey

Representing India
Gold medal – first place	1932 Los Angeles	Team competition

William Patrick "Pat" Sullivan (August 30, 1909 – 1981) was an Indian field hockey player who competed in the 1932 Summer Olympics.

In 1932 he was a member of the Indian field hockey team, which won the gold medal. He played one match as forward.

He was born in Lonavala, India, and died in Brent, United Kingdom.
