= Hector Dyer =

American sprinter

Medal record

Men's athletics

Representing the United States

Olympic Games
Gold medal – first place	1932 Los Angeles	4 × 100 m relay

Hector "Hec" Monroe Dyer (June 2, 1910 – May 19, 1990) was an American athlete, winner of a gold medal in 4 × 100 m relay at the 1932 Summer Olympics.

Born in Los Angeles, Hector Dyer enrolled at the Stanford University, where he was a member of Delta Kappa Epsilon Fraternity (Sigma Rho Chapter). While at Stanford he won the IC4A championships in 220 yd (200 m) in 1930.

During the 1932 Olympic trials, Dyer tied the world record of 10.4 in the 100-meter dash. He also beat the Olympic record in the 200-meter dash. At the 1932 Summer Olympics, held in Los Angeles, he ran the third leg in the American 4 × 100 m relay team, which won the gold medal with a new world record of 40.0.

In later years, Dyer worked in the oil business. He died in 1990 in Fullerton, California, aged 79. He was the grandson of William Newton Monroe.
