= Richard Carr (field hockey) =

Indian field hockey player (1911–2000)

- Richard John Carr in 1954 (Courtesy: Members of St George District Hockey Club, Sydney, Australia)

Personal information
- Full name: Richard John Carr
- Born: 21 January 1911 Jhajha, Bihar, British India
- Died: 25 April 2000 (aged 89) Sydney, Australia

Sport
- Sport: Field hockey
- Position: Right-out
National team
Years	Team	Caps	Goals
1932-1947	India	?	(?)
Medal record
Men's Field Hockey
Representing India
Olympic Games
Gold medal – first place	1932 Los Angeles	Team competition
- Updated on 31 August 2024

Richard John Carr (21 January 1911 – 25 April 2000) was an Indian field hockey player who competed in the 1932 Summer Olympics.

== Early life ==
Carr was born in Jhajha, India and was a student of the prestigious school Oak Grove School, Mussoorie, India.

== Nickname(s) ==
In India, where Carr lived up to 1948, he was nicknamed as Dickie Carr. When, he emigrated to Australia in 1948, there he was simply called Dick Carr.

== Los Angeles Olympics ==
He was a forward of the Indian field hockey team, which won the gold medal at Los Angeles. He played one match as right-out and scored one goal. He also competed in the men's 4 × 100 metres relay in the athletics programme.

== Berlin Olympics ==
Carr was selected for the Indian hockey team for the 1936 Olympics but could not get leave from his employer. Accordingly, Ahmed Sher Khan was sent in his place to Berlin.

== Emigration to Australia ==
In 1948, Carr emigrated to Australia.

== Gallery ==
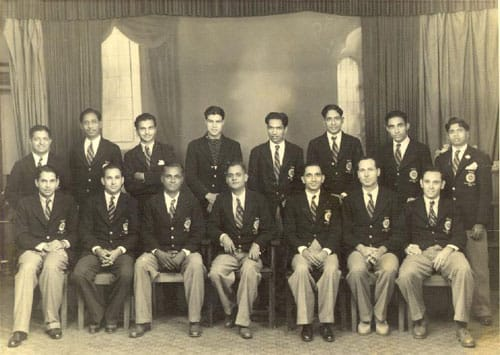
A group photograph of the Indian hockey team that visited East Africa (nowadays Kenya) during 1947–1948. Olympian Richard John Carr (Dikie Carr) is sitting sixth from left.

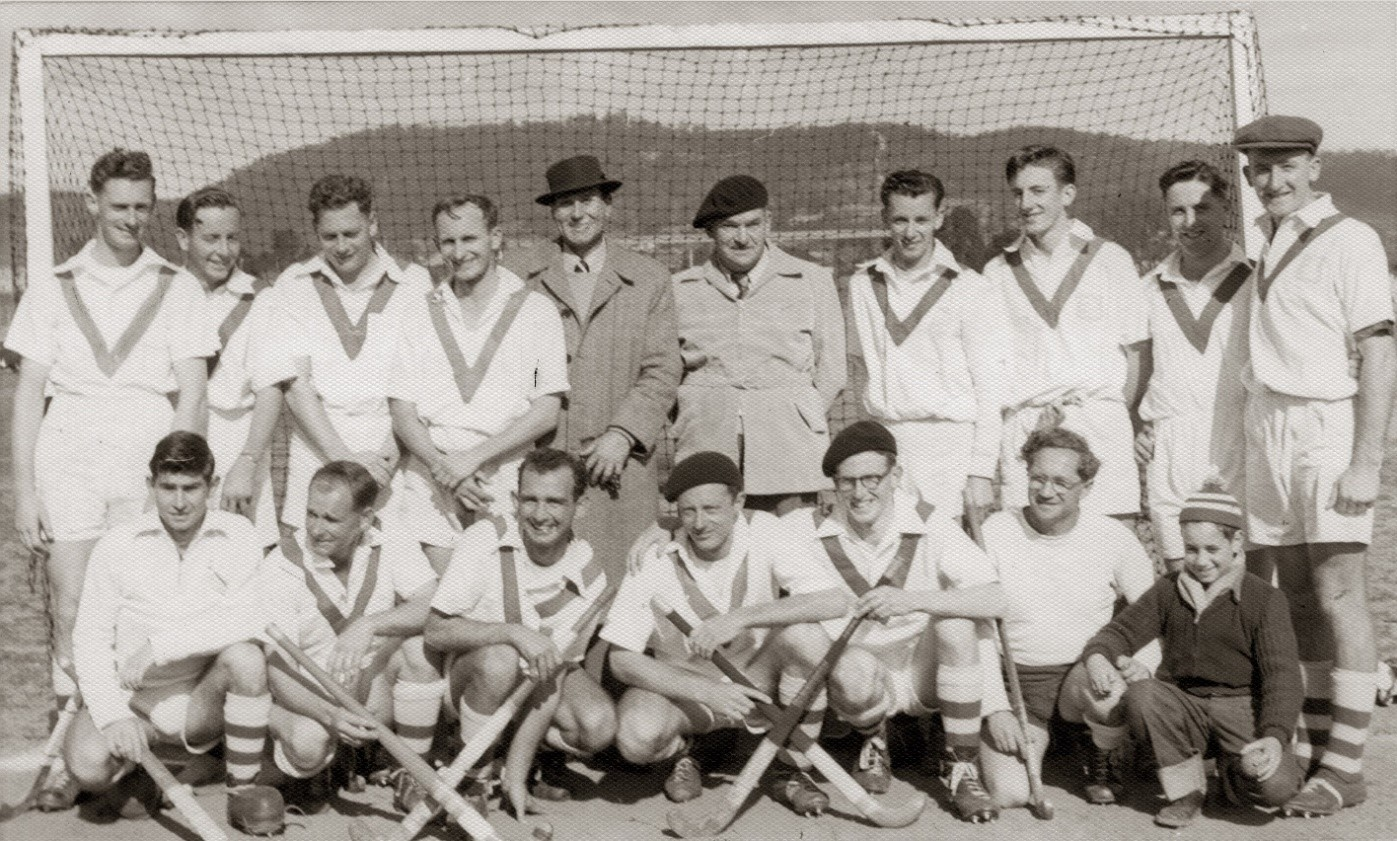
The St George District Hockey Club, Sydney, team in Lithgow, Australia, in July 1954. Standing: Captain of the team, Olympian Richard John Carr (Dick Carr), fifth from left; President of the New South Wales Hockey Association and the Australian Hockey Association, Dr Fraser, sixth from left. Sitting: Joe Crepp (goalkeeper), sixth from left; Jo Crepp's son Peter Crepp, extreme right. (Courtesy: Members of St George District Hockey Club, Sydney, Australia)
