= Ugo Frigerio =

Italian race walker (1901–1968)

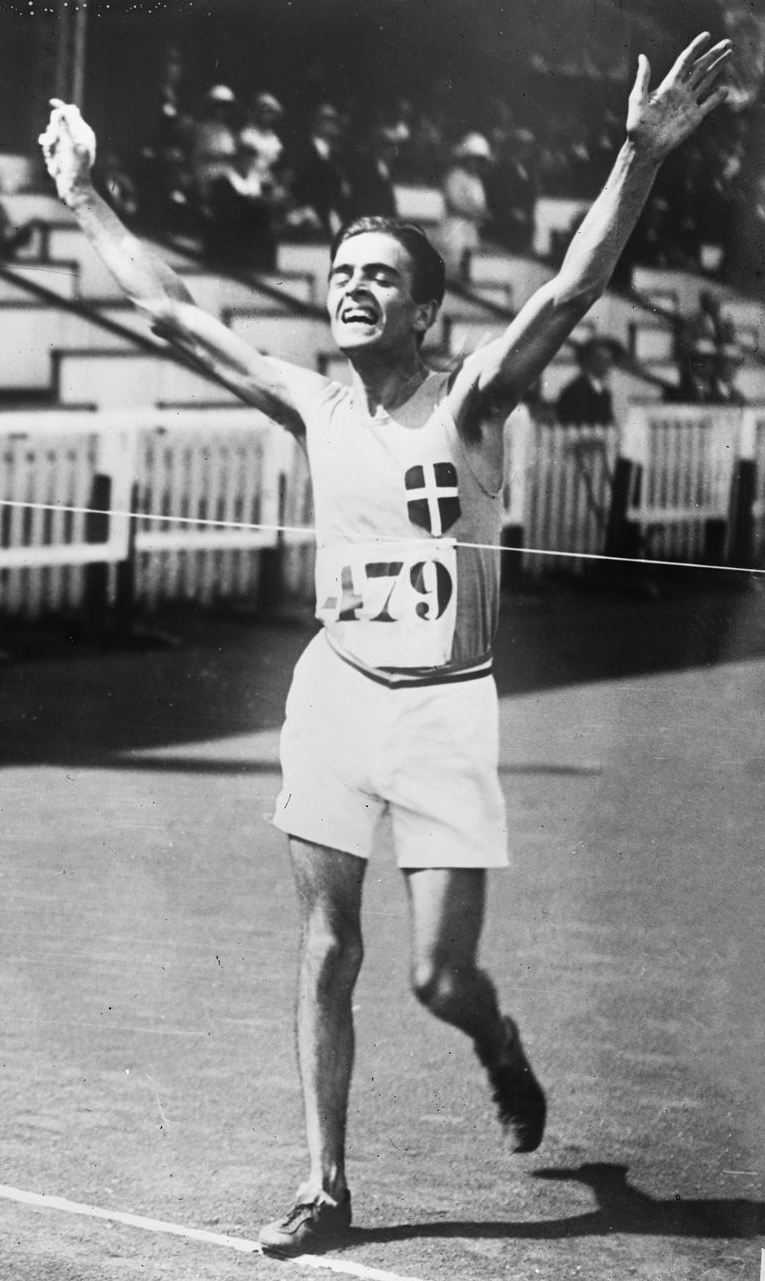
- Frigerio winning the 10 km walk at the 1920 Olympics

Personal information
- Nationality: Italian
- Born: 16 September 1901 Milan, Italy
- Died: 7 July 1968 (aged 66) Garda, Italy
- Height: 1.71 m (5 ft 7 1/2 in)
- Weight: 55 kg (121 lb)

Sport
- Country: Italy
- Sport: Athletics
- Event: Race walk
- Club: US Milanese

Achievements and titles
- Personal bests: 10 km walk – 44:38.0 (1925); 50 km walk – 4:59:06 (1932)
Medal record
Olympic Games
Gold medal – first place	1920 Antwerp	3 km walk
Gold medal – first place	1920 Antwerp	10 km walk
Gold medal – first place	1924 Paris	10 km walk
Bronze medal – third place	1932 Los Angeles	50 km walk

Ugo Frigerio (16 September 1901 – 7 July 1968) was an Italian race walker. He competed in four events at the 1920, 1924 and 1932 Olympics, ranging from 3 to 50 km, and won three gold and one bronze medals. He was the Olympic flag bearer for Italy in 1924 and 1932.

== Biography ==
Nationally Frigerio won nine race walking titles: in the 3 km (1921, 1922), 10 km (1919–1922, 1924, 1931), and one-hour walk (1920).

Before the 3 km Olympic race in 1920 in Antwerp Frigerio gave pages of sheet music that he wanted to hear to the band playing at the competition venue. During the race he would scold the conductor when the band was deviating from its tempo, and chat to the public, which eventually began to cheer him.

Frigerio won the British AAA Championships title in the 2 miles walk event at the British 1922 AAA Championships.

Frigerio semi-retired after learning that race walking was excluded from the 1928 Summer Olympics. He resumed training in 1931 to prepare for the 1932 Games, where the only walking event was 50 km, five times longer than his favourite 10 km distance. He won a bronze medal and retired for good, becoming a sports administrator. In 1934, he wrote an autobiography titled Marciando nel nome dell’Italia (Walking in the Name of Italy).

== Olympic achievements ==
Year	Competition	Venue	Position	Event	Performance	Note
1920	Olympic Games	(Belgium) Antwerp	1st	3 km walk	13:14,2	
1920	Olympic Games	(Belgium) Antwerp	1st	10 km walk	48:06.2	
1924	Olympic Games	(France) Paris	1st	10 km walk	47:49.0	
1932	Olympic Games	(United States) Los Angeles	3rd	50 km walk	4:59:06	

== See also ==
- Legends of Italian sport - Walk of Fame
- List of multiple Olympic gold medalists
- FIDAL Hall of Fame

Summer Olympics
Preceded by Nedo Nadi	Flag bearer for Italy; 1924 Paris	Succeeded by Carlo Galimberti
Preceded by Carlo Galimberti	Flag bearer for Italy; 1932 Los Angeles	Succeeded by Giulio Gaudini
