= Ruggero Maregatti =

Italian athletics competitor

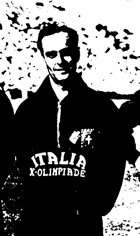

Personal information
- Nationality: Italian
- Born: 14 July 1905 Milan, Italy
- Died: 20 October 1963 (aged 58)
- Height: 1.86 m (6 ft 1 in)
- Weight: 78 kg (172 lb)

Sport
- Country: Italy
- Sport: Athletics
- Event: Sprint
- Club: AS Ambrosiana Milano

Achievements and titles
- Personal best: 100 m: 10.6 (1930)
Medal record
Bronze medal – third place	1932 Los Angeles	4x100 m relay

Ruggero Maregatti (July 14, 1905 – October 20, 1963) was an Italian athlete who competed mainly in the 100 metres.

== Biography ==
He competed for Italy in the 1932 Summer Olympics held in Los Angeles, California, in the 4x100 metre relay where he won the bronze medal with his team mates Giuseppe Castelli, Gabriele Salviati and Edgardo Toetti.

Ruggero Maregatti has 10 caps in national team from 1926 to 1932.

== Olympic results ==
Year	Competition	Venue	Position	Event	Performance	Notes
1932	Olympic Games	(United States) Los Angeles	3rd	4 × 100 m relay	41.2	

== National titles ==
Ruggero Maregatti has won 6 times the individual national championship.

- 2 wins on 100 metres (1924, 1925)
- 4 wins on 200 metres (1924, 1929, 1930, 1931)

== See also ==
- Italy national relay team
