= Richard Allen (field hockey) =

Indian field hockey player (1902–1969)

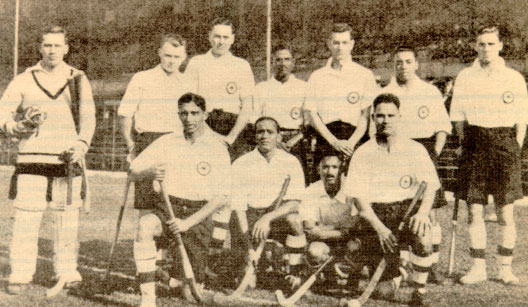
- Richard Allen is standing at extreme left in this group photo of 1928 Indian Olympic field hockey team.

Personal information
- Full name: Richard James Allen
- Born: 4 June 1902 Nagpur, British India
- Died: 1969 Bangalore, Karnataka, India
- Height: 5 ft 7.5 in (171.5 cm)

Sport
- Sport: Field hockey
- Position: Goalkeeper
Senior career
Years	Team	Caps	Goals
–	Port Commissioners	-	-
–	Bengal	-	-
National team
Years	Team	Caps	Goals
1928–1936	India		(0)
Medal record
Men's field hockey
Representing India
Olympic Games
Gold medal – first place	1928 Amsterdam	Team
Gold medal – first place	1932 Los Angeles	Team
Gold medal – first place	1936 Berlin	Team

Richard James Allen (4 June 1902 – 1969) was an Indian field hockey player who competed in the Summer Olympics in 1928, 1932, and 1936. He was born in Nagpur, India, and did his schooling at the prestigious Oak Grove School, Mussoorie and later at St. Joseph's College, Nainital.

In the 1928 Summer Olympics, he played five matches as goalkeeper, and no goals were scored against him. Four years later, he played one match against the United States as goalkeeper. The American team scored one goal against him, while he was off the field signing autographs (the final score was 24–1 in India's favour, a world record at that time). In the 1936 Summer Olympics he played four matches as goalkeeper. One goal was scored against him. This tally of conceding only two goals over three Olympic Games remains an Olympic record to this day.
