= Emmett Toppino =

American athlete

Martin Emmett Toppino
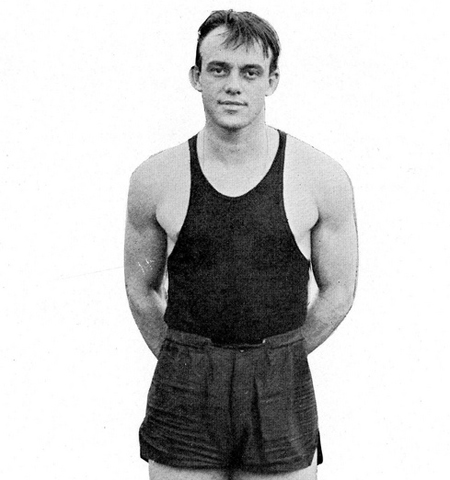
- Martin Emmett Toppino (1909–1971)

Personal information
- Born: July 1, 1909 New Orleans, Louisiana, U.S.
- Died: September 8, 1971 (aged 62) New Orleans, Louisiana, U.S.
Medal record
Men's athletics
Representing the United States
Olympic Games
Gold medal – first place	1932 Los Angeles	4 × 100 m relay

Martin Emmett Toppino (July 1, 1909 – September 8, 1971) was an American athlete, winner of a gold medal in the 4 × 100 m relay at the 1932 Summer Olympics.

At the Los Angeles Olympics, Emmett Toppino from New Orleans ran the second leg in the American 4 × 100 m relay team, which won the gold medal with a new world record of 40.0.

He was a member of the track and field team for the Loyola Wolf Pack and was a member of the Beggars Fraternity at Loyola University New Orleans.

Emmett Toppino died in New Orleans in 1971, aged 62.
