= Frank Brewin =

Indian field hockey player (1909–1976)

Olympic medal record

Men's field hockey

Representing India
Gold medal – first place	1932 Los Angeles	Team competition

Frank Gerald Singlehurst Brewin (October 21, 1909 – April 21, 1976) was an Indian field hockey player who competed in the 1932 Summer Olympics.

In 1932 he was a member of the Indian field hockey team, which won the gold medal. He played one match as back and scored one goal.

He was born in Poona, India.
