= Muhammad Aslam (field hockey) =

Indian field hockey player

Olympic medal record

Men's field hockey

Representing India
Gold medal – first place	1932 Los Angeles	Team competition

Sardar Muhammad Aslam Bagga (1910 – unknown) was an Indian field hockey player who competed in the 1932 Summer Olympics.

In 1932 he was a member of the Indian field hockey team, which won the gold medal. He played one match as back.

He was born in modern-day Lyallpur now Faisalabad, Pakistan.
