= Edgardo Toetti =

Italian sprinter (1910–1968)

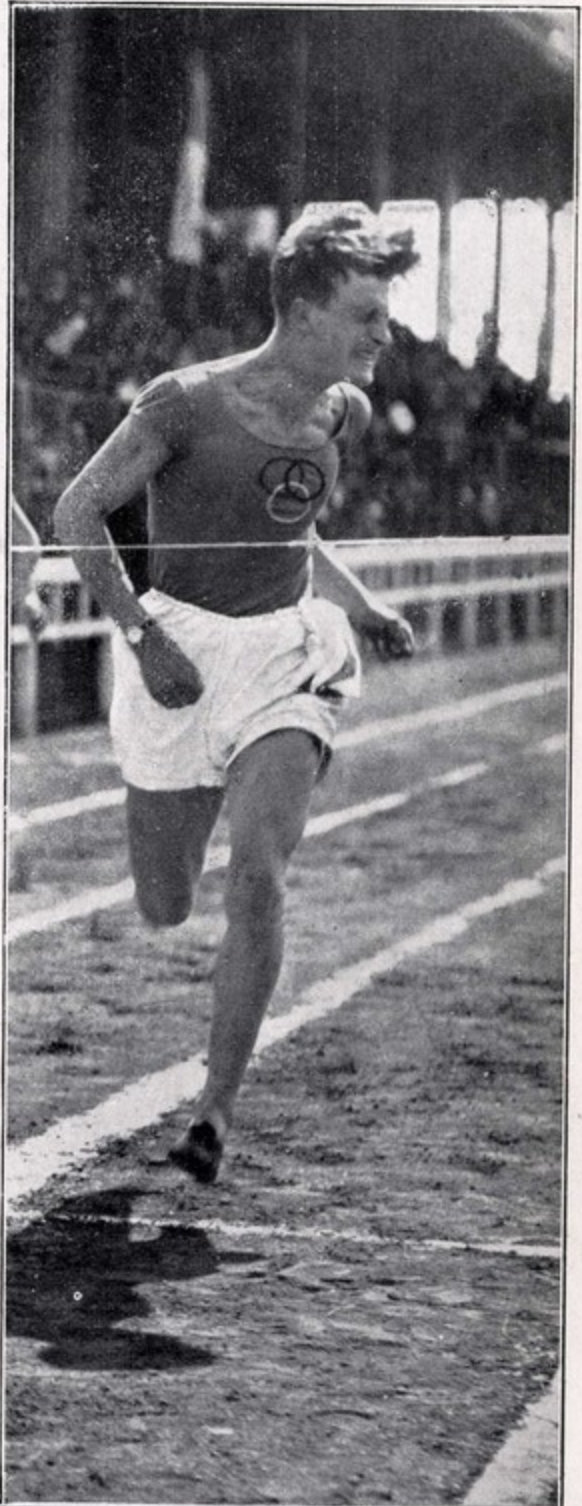
- Edgardo Toetti in 1928.

Personal information
- Nationality: Italian
- Born: 10 July 1910 Milan, Italy
- Died: 2 June 1968 (aged 57)

Sport
- Country: Italy
- Sport: Athletics
- Event: Sprint
- Club: Sport Club Italia

Achievements and titles
- Personal bests: 100 m: 10.6 (1928); 200 m: 21.8 (1931)
Medal record
Olympic Games
Bronze medal – third place	1932 Los Angeles	4x100 m relay

Edgardo Toetti (10 July 1910 – 2 June 1968) was an Italian athlete who competed mainly in the 100 metres.

== Biography ==
Toetti finished third behind Jack London in the 100 yards event at the British 1929 AAA Championships, second behind Christiaan Berger in the 100 yards event at the 1930 AAA Championships and third behind third behind Ernie Page in the 100 yards event at the 1931 AAA Championships.

He competed for an Italy in the 1932 Summer Olympics held in Los Angeles, California, in the 4 x 100 metre relay where he won the bronze medal with his teammates Giuseppe Castelli, Ruggero Maregatti and Gabriele Salviati.

== Olympic results ==
Year	Competition	Venue	Position	Event	Performance	Notes
1932	Olympic Games	(United States) Los Angeles	3rd	4 × 100 m relay	41.2	

== National titles ==
Edgardo Toetti has won nine time the individual national championship.

- 6 wins on 100 metres (1928, 1929, 1930, 1931, 1932, 1934)
- 3 wins on 200 metres (1928, 1932, 1934)

== See also ==
- Italy national relay team
- 100 metres winners of Italian Athletics Championships
