= Giuseppe Castelli =

Italian athletics competitor

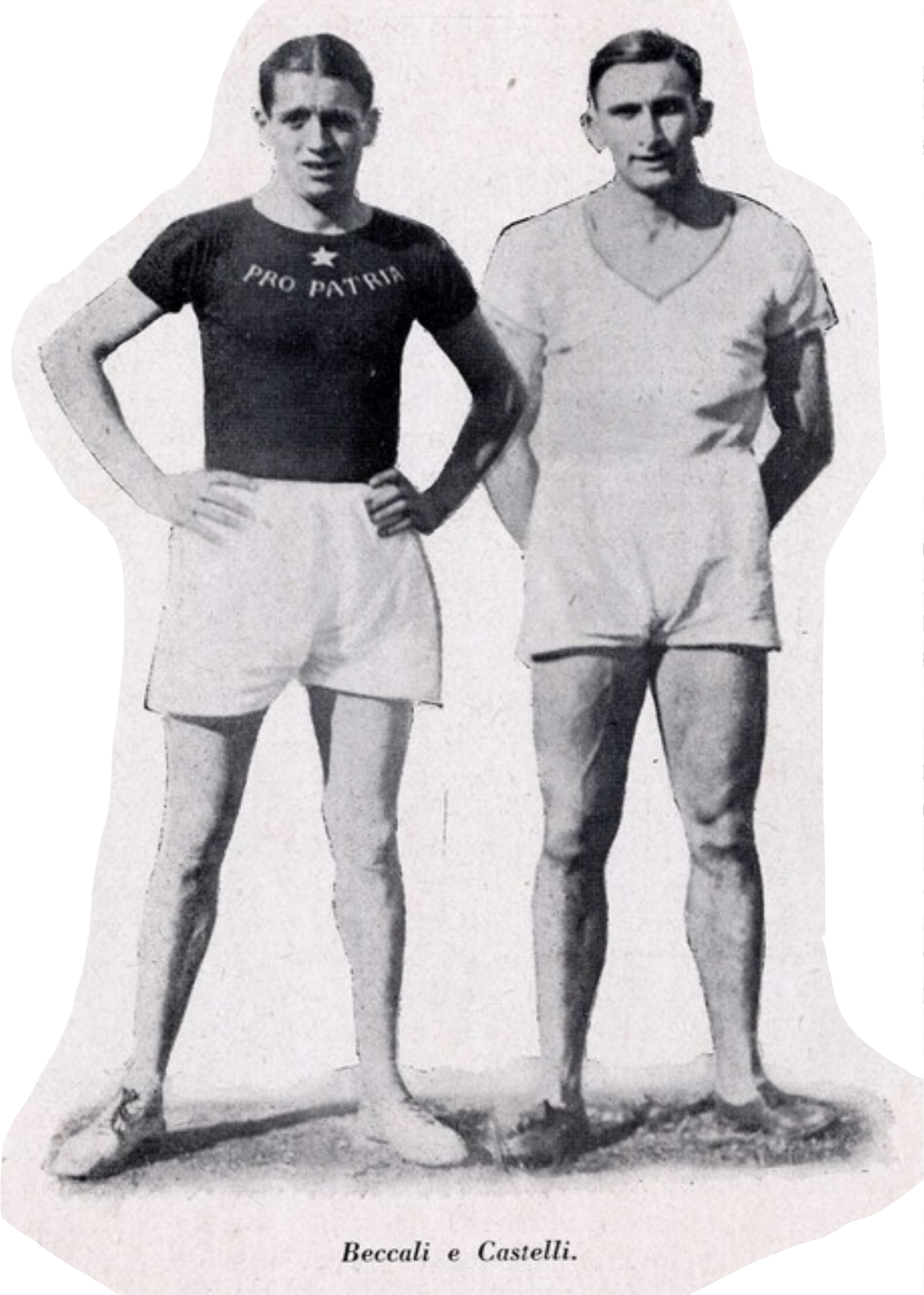
- Luigi Beccali e Giuseppe Castelli

Personal information
- Nationality: Italian
- Born: 5 October 1907 Frugarolo, Italy
- Died: 19 December 1942 (aged 35)
- Height: 1.70 m (5 ft 7 in)

Sport
- Country: Italy
- Sport: Athletics
- Event: Sprint
- Club: S. Ginnastica Torino

Achievements and titles
- Personal bests: 100 m: 10.9 (1928); 200 m: 22.4 (1928)
Medal record
Bronze medal – third place	1932 Los Angeles	4x100 m relay

Giuseppe Castelli (5 October 1907 – 19 December 1942) was an Italian athlete who competed mainly in the 100 metres.

== Biography ==
He competed for Italy in the 1932 Summer Olympics held in Los Angeles, California, in the 4 x 100 metre relay where he won the bronze medal with his teammates Ruggero Maregatti, Gabriele Salviati and Edgardo Toetti. He was killed in action during World War II.

== Olympic results ==
Year	Competition	Venue	Position	Event	Performance	Notes
1932	Olympic Games	(United States) Los Angeles	3rd	4 × 100 m relay	41.2	

== See also ==
- Italy national relay team
