= Mehar Chand Dhawan =

Indian athletics competitor

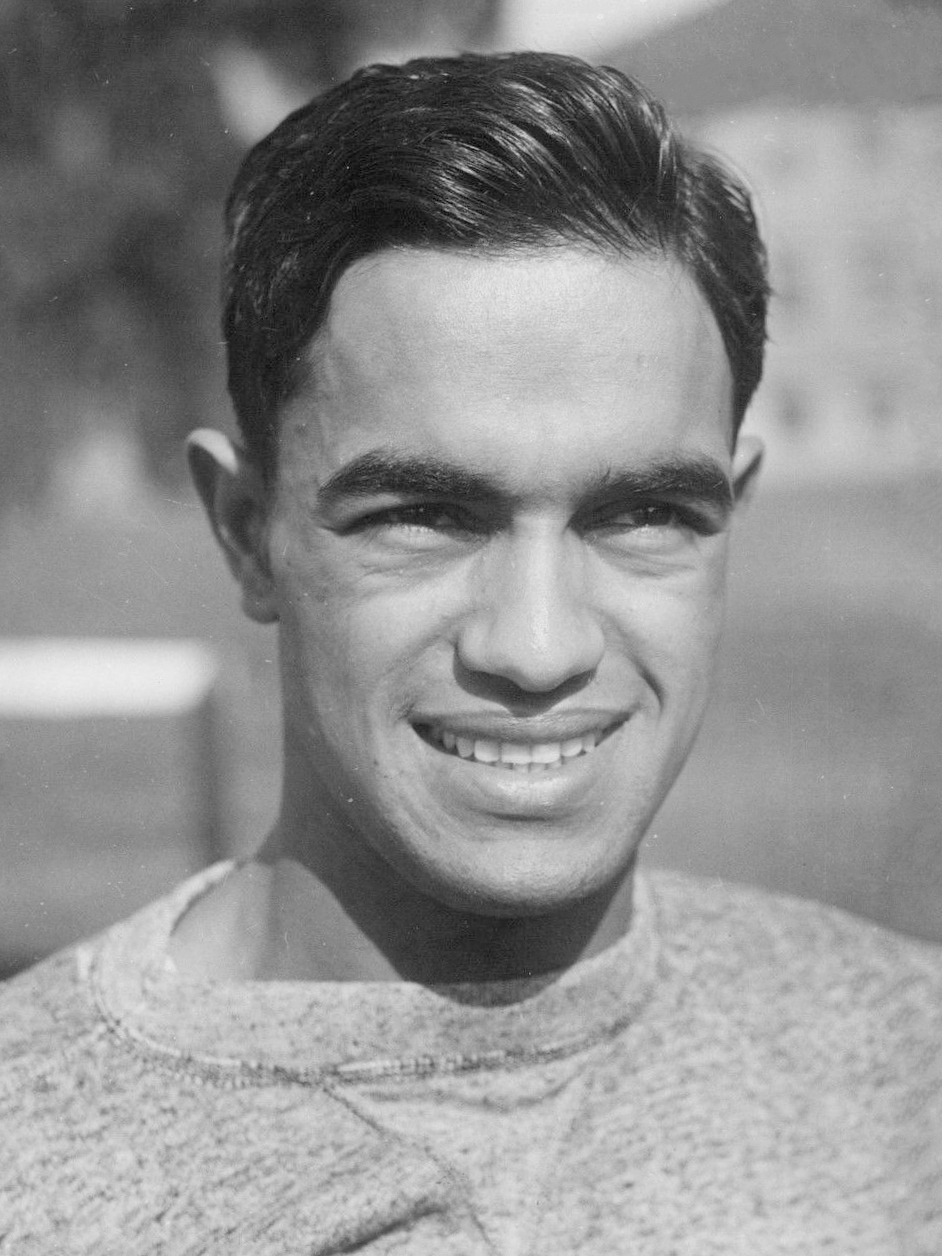
- Dhawan at the 1932 Olympics

Personal information
- Born: 3 June 1912 Shimla, India

Sport
- Sport: Athletics
- Event(s): Triple jump, 100 m

Achievements and titles
- Personal best: TJ – 14.29 m (1935)
Medal record
Men's Athletics
Representing India
Western Asiatic Games
Gold medal – first place	1934 Delhi	Hop, Step and Jump
Silver medal – second place	1934 Delhi	Javelin Throw

Mehar Chand Dhawan was an Indian sprinter and triple jumper. He placed 14th in the triple jump and was eliminated in the first round of the 4 × 100 m relay competition at the 1932 Summer Olympics.
