= Arthur Jonath =

German sprinter (1909–1963)

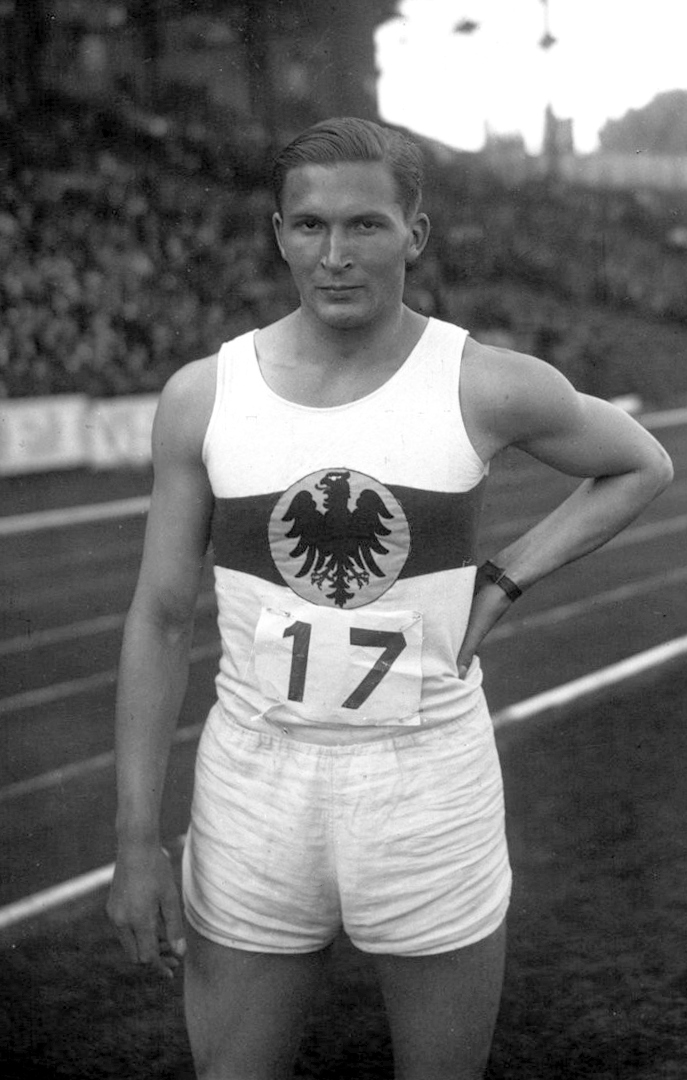
- Arthur Jonath in 1931

Personal information
- Born: 9 September 1909 Bentrop, Province of Westphalia, Prussia, German Empire
- Died: 14 April 1963 (aged 53) Neu-Isenburg, West Germany
- Height: 1.79 m (5 ft 10 in)
- Weight: 73 kg (161 lb)

Sport
- Sport: Athletics
- Events: 100 m, 200 m
- Club: TuS Bochum

Achievements and titles
- Personal bests: 100 m – 10.50 (1932); 200 m – 21.2 (1932)
Medal record
Representing Germany
Olympic Games
Silver medal – second place	1932 Los Angeles	4 × 100 m relay
Bronze medal – third place	1932 Los Angeles	100 m

Arthur Jonath (9 September 1909 – 14 April 1963) was a German sprinter. He competed at the 1932 Summer Olympics in the 4 × 100 m, 100 m and 200 m events and finished in second, third and fourth place, respectively.

Jonath was a boxer, and switched to athletics due to a hand injury. In 1931-1932 he won the German titles in both 100 m and 200 m. He set three indoor world records in the 50 m and 60 m in 1930 and 1931, and two outdoor world records in the 100 m in 1932 and 1933; he set three more world records with the German 4 × 100 m relay team.

Jonath finished third behind George Saunders in the 100 yards event at the British 1933 AAA Championships.

After the Los Angeles Games, Jonath stayed in the United States upon invitation from actresses Greta Garbo and Marlene Dietrich. He was offered American citizenship and a university education, but his stepfather brought him back to Germany. Jonath was a guest of honor at the Berlin Olympics. During World War II he fought as an SS officer on the Eastern Front; he was taken prisoner by the Soviet troops and then transferred to an American prisoner-of-war camp near Frankfurt.

After the war Jonath ran a petrol station and trained runners at FSV 1899 Frankfurt. His nephew Ulrich also became a prominent athletic coach.

Records
Preceded by —	European Record Holder Men's 100 m 5 June 1932 - 25 August 1934	Succeeded by (Netherlands) Chris Berger
