= Bob Kiesel =

American sprinter

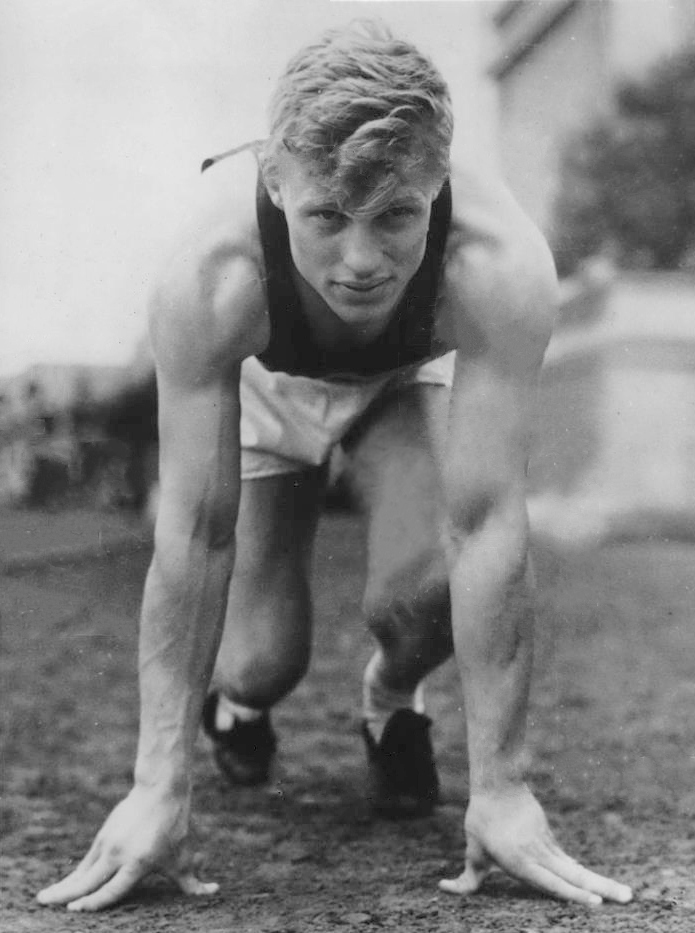
- Kiesel in 1932

Personal information
- Born: August 30, 1911 Sacramento, California, U.S.
- Died: August 6, 1993 (aged 81) Boise, Idaho, U.S.
- Height: 178 cm (5 ft 10 in)
- Weight: 70 kg (154 lb)

Sport
- Sport: Athletics
- Event: Sprint
- Club: California Golden Bears

Achievements and titles
- Personal bests: 100 m – 10.4 (1932); 200 m – 21.2 (1934)
Medal record
Representing the United States
Olympic Games
Gold medal – first place	1932 Los Angeles	4 × 100 m relay

Robert Allan Kiesel (August 30, 1911 – August 6, 1993) was an American sprinter who won a gold medal in 4 × 100 m relay at the 1932 Summer Olympics. He worked for a paint manufacturing company until 1941, then served in the U.S. Army, then spent 23 years in the family real estate and investment business in Utah, and finally settled on his farm in Idaho.
