= Nalin Malik =

Indian swimmer

Personal information
- Full name: Nalin Chandra Malik
- Born: 1910 Calcutta, British India

Sport
- Sport: Swimming

Nalin Chandra Malik (born 1910, date of death unknown) was an Indian swimmer. He competed in two events at the 1932 Summer Olympics.

Malik also worked as a trainer at a swimming club located at Rabindra Sarobar.
