= Field hockey at the 1928 Summer Olympics – Men's team squads =

The following is the list of squads that took place in the men's field hockey tournament at the 1928 Summer Olympics.

== Division A ==
=== Austria ===
The following is the Austria roster in the men's field hockey tournament of the 1928 Summer Olympics.

- August Wildam
- Arthur Winter
- Alfred Revi
- Emil Haladik
- Fritz Steiner
- Erwin Nossig
- Fritz Herzl
- Fritz Lichtschein
- Hubert Lichtneckert
- Hans Rosenfeld
- Hans Wald
- Kurt Lehrfeld
- Karl Ördögh
- Josef Berger
- Paul Massarek
- Willi Machu

=== Belgium ===
The following is the Belgium roster in the men's field hockey tournament of the 1928 Summer Olympics.

- Lambert Adelot
- Claude Baudoux
- Yvon Baudoux
- Freddy Cattoir
- Louis De Deken
- Paul Delheid
- Louis Diercxsens
- Auguste Goditiabois
- Adolphe Goemaere
- Georges Grosjean
- Joseph Jastine
- Carl Koning
- René Mallieux
- André Seeldrayers
- Étienne Soubre
- John Van Der Straeten
- Émile Vercken
- Corneille Wellens
- F. Carez
- Ch. de Keyzer
- V. de Laveleye
- Jacques Rensburg

=== Denmark ===
The following is the Denmark roster in the men's field hockey tournament of the 1928 Summer Olympics.

- Arne Blach
- Otto Busch
- Hagbarth Dahlmann
- Aage Heimann
- Niels Heilbuth
- Henning Holst
- Erik Husted
- Otto Husted
- Peter Koefoed
- Henry Madsen
- Carl Malling
- Børge Monberg
- Peter Prahm
- Aage Norsker

=== India ===
The following is the India roster in the men's field hockey tournament of the 1928 Summer Olympics.

- Richard Allen
- Major Dhyan Chand
- Maurice Gateley
- William Goodsir-Cullen
- Leslie Hammond
- Feroze Khan
- George Marthins
- Rex Norris
- Broome Pinniger
- Michael Rocque
- Frederic Seaman
- Ali Shaukat
- Jaipal Singh Munda (C)
- Sayed Yusuf
- Kher Singh Gill

=== Switzerland ===
The following is the Switzerland roster in the men's field hockey tournament of the 1928 Summer Olympics.

- Adalbert Koch
- Adolf Fehr
- Charles Piot
- Ernst Luchsinger
- Édouard Mauris
- Alfred Fischer
- Fred Jenny
- Henri Poncet
- Jean Loubert
- Jean-Jacques Auberson
- Maurice Magnin
- Max Zumstein
- Roland Olivier
- René Pellarin
- Roger Rodé
- Werner Fehr
- J. Brun
- E. Coppetti
- F. Hermenjat
- L. Joset
- A. Rhinow

== Division B ==
=== France ===
The following is the France roster in the men's field hockey tournament of the 1928 Summer Olympics.

- Georges Arlin
- Guy Chevalier
- Pierre de Lévaque
- Félix Grimonprez
- Marcel Lachmann
- Maurice Lanet
- Roger Petit-Didier
- Henri Peuchot
- Bernard Poussineau
- Pierre Prieur
- Jacques Rivière
- Jean Robin
- Robert Salarnier
- Jacques Simon
- Charles Six
- A. Bié
- M. L. Guirard
- Paul Imbault
- H. E. J. A. Reisenthel
- J. Rémusat

=== Germany ===
The following is the Germany roster in the men's field hockey tournament of the 1928 Summer Olympics.

- Bruno Boche
- Georg Brunner
- Heinz Förstendorf
- Erwin Franzkowiak
- Werner Freyberg
- Theodor Haag
- Hans Haußmann
- Kurt Haverbeck
- Aribert Heymann
- Herbert Hobein
- Fritz Horn
- Karl-Heinz Irmer
- Herbert Kemmer
- Herbert Müller
- Werner Proft
- Gerd Strantzen
- Rolf Wollner
- Heinz Wöltje
- Erich Zander
- Fritz Lincke
- Heinz Schäfer
- Kurt Weiß

=== Netherlands ===
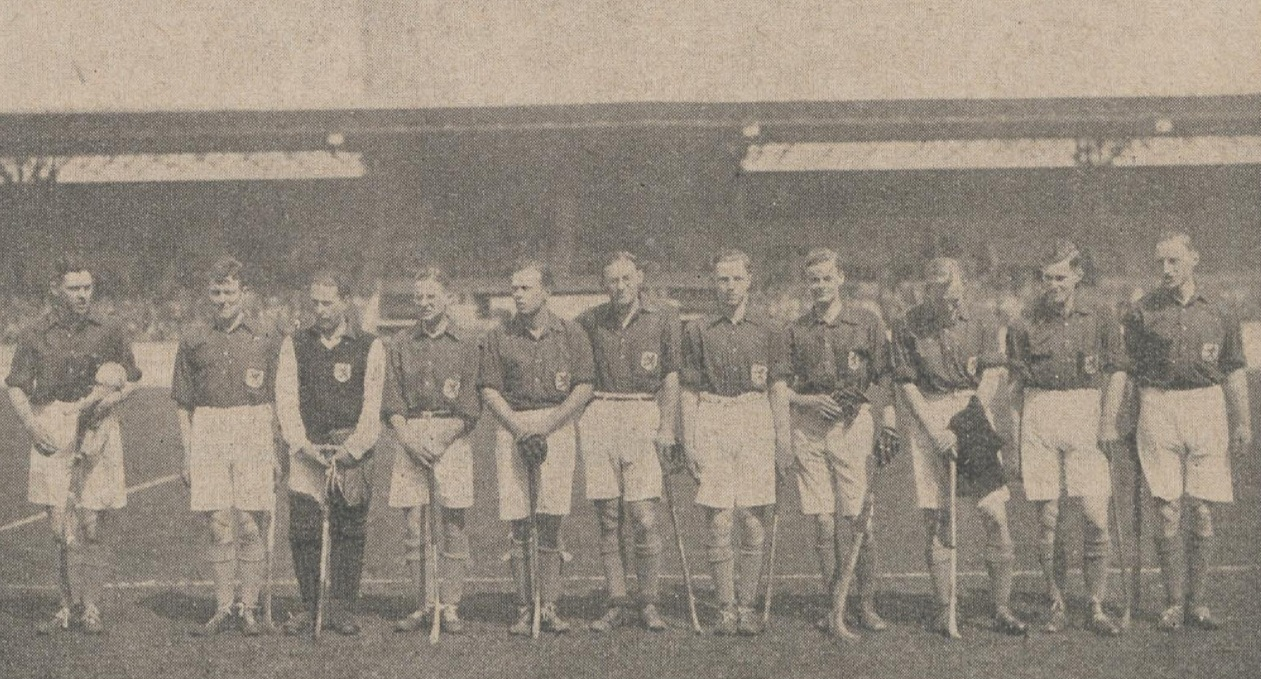
The Dutch Hockey team

The following is the Netherlands roster in the men's field hockey tournament of the 1928 Summer Olympics.

- Jan Ankerman
- Jan Brand
- Rein de Waal
- Emile Duson
- Gerrit Jannink
- Adriaan Katte
- August Kop
- Ab Tresling
- Paul van de Rovaart
- Robert van der Veen
- Haas Visser 't Hooft
- C. J. J. Hardebeck
- T. F. Hubrecht
- G. Leembruggen
- H. J. L. Mangelaar Meertens
- Otto Muller von Czernicki
- W. J. van Citters
- C. J. van der Hagen
- Tonny van Lierop
- J. J. van Tienhoven van den Bogaard
- J. M. van Voorst van Beest
- N. Wenholt

=== Spain ===
The following is the Spain roster in the men's field hockey tournament of the 1928 Summer Olympics.

- Bernabé de Chávarri
- Enrique de Chávarri
- Fernando Torres-Polanco
- Francisco Argemí
- Francisco De Roig
- Jaime Bagúña
- José María de Caralt
- José de Caralt
- José de Chávarri
- Juan Becerril
- Juan Junqueras
- Luis Isamat
- Luis Rierola
- Manuel Lobo
- Santiago Goicoechea
- José de Aguilera Alonso
- A. Heraso Lledo
