= Spain at the 1928 Summer Olympics =

- IOC code: ESP
- NOC: Spanish Olympic Committee

in Amsterdam
- Competitors: 80 men in 10 sports
- Flag bearer: Diego Ordóñez
- Medals Ranked 24th: Gold 1 Silver 0 Bronze 0 Total 1

Summer Olympics appearances (overview)
- 1900; 1904–1912; 1920; 1924; 1928; 1932; 1936; 1948; 1952; 1956; 1960; 1964; 1968; 1972; 1976; 1980; 1984; 1988; 1992; 1996; 2000; 2004; 2008; 2012; 2016; 2020; 2024

Spain competed at the 1928 Summer Olympics in Amsterdam, Netherlands. 80 competitors, all men, took part in 34 events in 10 sports.

== Medalists ==
Medal	Name	Sport	Event	Date
Gold	José Álvarez de Bohórquez, Julio García Fernández de los Ríos; José Navarro Morenés	Equestrian	Team jumping	August 12

== Boxing ==
Men's Flyweight (– 50.8 kg)

- José Villanova Pueyo

- First round — Bye
- Second round — lost to Antal Kocsis (HUN), points

== Cycling ==
One male cyclist represented Spain in 1928.

Sprint

- José Maria Yermo

== Fencing ==
Nine fencers, all men, represented Spain in 1928.

Men's foil

- Domingo García
- Fernando García
- Armando Alemán

Men's team foil

- Diego Díez, Domingo García, Juan Delgado, Félix de Pomés, Fernando García

Men's épée

- Domingo García
- Francisco González

Men's team épée

- Juan Delgado, Domingo García, Diego Díez, Félix de Pomés, Francisco González

Men's sabre

- Isidro González
- Francisco González
- Juan Jesús García

== Hockey ==
Roster

The following is the Spain roster in the men's field hockey tournament of the 1928 Summer Olympics.

- Bernabé de Chávarri
- Enrique de Chávarri
- Fernando Torres-Polanco
- Francisco Argemí
- Francisco De Roig
- Jaime Bagúña
- José María de Caralt
- José de Caralt
- José de Chávarri
- Juan Becerril
- Juan Junqueras
- Luis Isamat
- Luis Rierola
- Manuel Lobo
- Santiago Goicoechea
- José de Aguilera Alonso
- A. Heraso Lledo

Group play

Pos	Team	Pld	W	D	L	GF	GA	GD	Pts	Qualification
1	Netherlands (H)	3	2	1	0	8	2	+6	5	Gold medal match
2	Germany	3	2	0	1	8	3	+5	4	Bronze medal match
3	France	3	1	0	2	2	8	−6	2	
4	Spain	3	0	1	2	3	8	−5	1	

Source: 1928 Official Report, p. 689
(H) Hosts

17 May 1928
19:30

Germany	5–1	Spain
Hobein 6', 34'; Boche 20'; Müller 33'; Haag 41'	Report	E. de Chávarri 40'

Olympisch Stadion, Amsterdam
Attendance: 1,300
Umpires:
E. W. C. Ricketts (IND)
P. Regibo (BEL)

19 May 1928
19:00

France	2–1	Spain
Rivière 38'; Grimonprez 68'	Report	B. de Chávarri 29'

Olympisch Stadion, Amsterdam
Attendance: 500
Umpires:
C. Terrier (SUI)
C. Ch. Geyl (NED)

23 May 1928
16:45

Netherlands	1–1	Spain
Van der Veen 20'	Report	De Roig 63'

Old Stadium, Amsterdam
Attendance: 2,750
Umpires:
P. Regibo (BEL)
R. Be-Cavin (SUI)

== Swimming ==
Men

Athlete	Event	Heat		Semifinal		Final	
Athlete	Event	Time	Rank	Time	Rank	Time	Rank
José González	100 m freestyle	Unknown		Did not advance			
José Francesch	200 m breaststroke	Unknown		Did not advance			
Francisco Segalá; Estanislao Artal; Ramón Artigas; José González	4 × 200 m freestyle relay	—		11:50.6		Unknown	
