= India at the 1928 Summer Olympics =

- Flag of India
- IOC code: IND
- NOC: Indian Olympic Association

in Amsterdam
- Competitors: 21 in 2 sports
- Medals Ranked 24th: Gold 1 Silver 0 Bronze 0 Total 1

Summer Olympics appearances (overview)
- 1900; 1904–1912; 1920; 1924; 1928; 1932; 1936; 1948; 1952; 1956; 1960; 1964; 1968; 1972; 1976; 1980; 1984; 1988; 1992; 1996; 2000; 2004; 2008; 2012; 2016; 2020; 2024; 2028

Other related appearances
- Pakistan (1948–pres.); Bangladesh (1984–pres.)

India competed at the 1928 Summer Olympics in Amsterdam, Netherlands. It was the country's fourth participation in the Summer Olympics its debut at the 1900 Summer Olympics. The Indian team consisted of 21 athletes and competed in two sports. India competed in the men's field hockey event for the first time in the history of the Games, and won the gold medal. It was the country's first gold medal, and it began a streak in the sport that continued through the 1956 Games.

== Background ==
In 1927, the provisional Indian Olympic Committee was recognized by the International Olympic Committee and formally became the Indian Olympic Association. The organization was formed to promote the development of sports in India, host the national games, and select teams for the Olympics.

India competed in the 1928 Summer Olympics held in Amsterdam, Netherland. It was the country's fourth participation in the Summer Olympics after its debut in the 1900 Summer Olympics. The Indian team consisted of 21 athletes, who competed in two sports. The Indian Hockey Federation, which had been established earlier in 1925, sent the men's field hockey team to the 1928 Games for the first time.

== Medalists ==
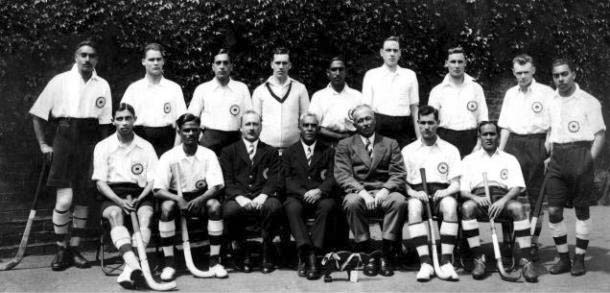
The Indian field hockey team that won the gold medal

The hockey team won India's first gold medal in the Olympics at the Games. This was the first gold medal won by any nation from Asia at the modern Olympic Games. It began a winning streak in the sport that continued through the 1956 Games.

Medal	Name	Sport	Event	Date
Gold	India men's national field hockey team: Richard Allen; Dhyan Chand; Michael Gateley; William Goodsir-Cullen; Leslie Hammond; Feroze Khan; George Marthins; Rex Norris; Broome Pinniger; Michael Rocque; Frederic Seaman; Ali Shaukat; Jaipal Singh; Sayed Yusuf	Field hockey		May 26

== Competitors ==
There were 21 athletes who took part in two sports.

Competitors representing India
Sport	Men	Women	Total
Athletics	7	0	7
Field hockey	14	0	14
Total	21	0	21

== Athletics ==
Seven athletes represented India in athletics at the Games.

Men
Track Events

Athlete	Event	Heats		Quarterfinals		Semifinals		Final	
Athlete	Event	Result	Rank	Result	Rank	Result	Rank	Result	Rank
Ronald Burns	100 m	Unknown	6	Did not advance					
Ronald Burns	200 m	Unknown	4	Did not advance					
James Hall	200 m	Unknown	4	Did not advance					
James Hall	400 m	Unknown	2 Q	Unknown	5	Did not advance			
J. Murphy	800 m	—N/a		Unknown	7	Did not advance			
Gurbachan Singh	5000 m	—N/a				Did not finish		Did not advance	
Chavan Singh	10000 m	—N/a						Did not finish	
S. Abdul Hamid	110 m hurdles	Unknown	4	—N/a		Did not advance			
S. Abdul Hamid	400 m hurdles	Unknown	6	—N/a		Did not advance			

Note: Ranks given are within the heat or particular round.

Field Events

Athlete	Event	Qualification		Final	
Athlete	Event	Distance	Position	Distance	Position
Dalip Singh	Long Jump	6.45	37	Did not advance	

== Field hockey ==
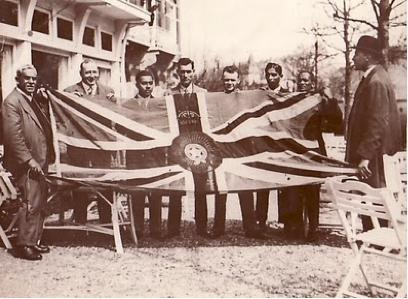
The Indian hockey players holding the flag at the Olympics

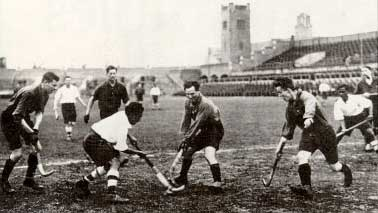
The Indian hockey team during a match at the Olympics

The Fédération Internationale de Hockey was established in 1926, and field hockey returned to the Olympic Programme for the 1928 Games after missing from the previous Games. This was the first appearance of the Indian hockey team at the Olympic Games. The Indian team, which was established only in 1926, did an international tour before the Games. During the tour, Great Britain and the constituent teams refused to play the Indian team. However, India beat Hockey Association XI consisting of multiple English internationals, and an Anglo-Scottish XI during the tour. Great Britain, who were the defending Olympic champions from the 1920 Games, withdrew their entry to the Games, probably because of the possibility of losing to India, which was still a British dependency at that time.

The Indian team won all the four matches in the preliminary round, scoring 26 goals and not conceding a single goal. In the other group, Netherlands topped the table, after a 2-1 win over Germany. The hockey team won the country's only medal, a gold, after beating Netherlands in the finals at the Olympisch Stadion.

Roster

The following is the India roster in the men's field hockey tournament of the 1928 Summer Olympics.

- Richard Allen
- Major Dhyan Chand
- Maurice Gateley
- William Goodsir-Cullen
- Leslie Hammond
- Feroze Khan
- George Marthins
- Rex Norris
- Broome Pinniger
- Michael Rocque
- Frederic Seaman
- Ali Shaukat
- Jaipal Singh Munda (C)
- Sayed Yusuf
- Kher Singh Gill

Pos	Team	Pld	W	D	L	GF	GA	GD	Pts	Qualification
1	India	4	4	0	0	26	0	+26	8	Gold medal match
2	Belgium	4	3	0	1	8	9	−1	6	Bronze medal match
3	Denmark	4	2	0	2	5	8	−3	4	
4	Switzerland	4	1	0	3	2	11	−9	2	
5	Austria	4	0	0	4	1	14	−13	0	

Source: 1928 Official Report, p. 685

17 May 1928
17:00

India	6–0	Austria
Chand 4', 6', ?', ?'; Shaukat ?'; Gateley ?'	Report

Umpires:
Ch. Roux (FRA)
F. Schiff (NED)

18 May 1928
16:30

India	9–0	Belgium
Seaman 5', 55'; Marthins 19'; Khan 28', 29', 36', ?', ?'; Chand 31'	Report

Umpires:
W. Simon (GER)
T. Evekink (NED)

20 May 1928
16:00

India	5–0	Denmark
Chand 4', 26', 51', 54'; Seaman 65'	Report

Umpires:
R. Jassoy (GER)
J. Daubresse (FRA)

22 May 1928
15:00

India	6–0	Switzerland
Marthins 6'; Chand 26', 53', 55', 65'; Gateley ?'	Report

Umpires:
P. Reinberg (GER)
M. Masip Ubis (ESP)

Gold Medal Match

26 May 1928
15:45

(gold) India	3–0	Netherlands (silver)
Chand 15', 36'; Marthins ?'	Report

Olympisch Stadion, Amsterdam
Attendance: 40,000
Umpires:
w. Simon (GER)
R. Liégeois (BEL)

== Swimming ==
Dwarka Das Mulji qualified for three swimming events. He would have become the first Indian Olympic swimmer, however, he did not start the events.
