= Prahm =

Prahm is a surname. Notable people with the surname include:

- Jean Prahm (born 1978), American bobsledder
- Louis Prahm (1912–2003), Danish field hockey player
- Peter Prahm (1908–2003), Danish field hockey player
