= Jean-Jacques Auberson =

Swiss field hockey player

Personal information
- Nationality: Swiss
- Died: September 1964 Geneva, Switzerland

Sport
- Sport: Field hockey

Jean-Jacques Auberson (died September 1964) was a Swiss field hockey player. He competed in the men's tournament at the 1928 Summer Olympics.
