= Lal Shah Bokhari =

Indian field hockey player (1906–1959)

Lal Shah Bokhari لال شاہ بخاری
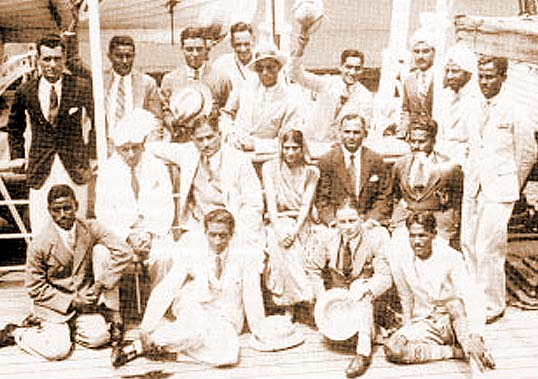
- Indian hockey team en route to Los Angeles Olympics in 1932. Captain of the team, Lal Shah Bokhari, (in turban) is sitting on extreme left chair.

Personal information
- Full name: Syed Lal Shah Bokhari
- Born: 13 January 1906 Lyallpur, Punjab, British India
- Died: 22 July 1959 (aged 53) Baghdad, Iraq
- Height: 5 ft 8 in (173 cm)

Sport
- Sport: Field hockey
- Position: Left-half
Youth career
- Years: Team
- 1921–1922: Government College, Lahore
Senior career
Years	Team	Caps	Goals
1923–1934	Government College, Lahore	-	-
National team
Years	Team	Caps	Goals
1932	India		(0)
Medal record
Men's Field Hockey
Representing British India
Olympic Games
Gold medal – first place	1932 Los Angeles	Team competition
- Updated on 4 May 2024

Lal Shah Bokhari (Urdu: لال شاہ بخاری; born 13 January 1906 – 22 July 1959) was a field hockey player who represented India. He was the captain of the 15-member Indian field hockey team in the 1932 Summer Olympics.

== 1932 Olympics ==
In 1932, he was the captain of the India men's national field hockey team, which won the gold medal at the Los Angeles Olympics. There were total three teams in the tournament and every team played two matches. He played both the matches from his team.

The Indian team was troubled by groupism (natives vs Anglo-Indians) that surfaced when Lal Shah Bokhari was named captain against the expectations of Broome Eric Pinniger. Pinniger expected this slot since he was India's vice-captain at the 1928 Summer Olympics. It appeared that Pinniger would not go with the team in protest. However, later he reconciled and accompanied the team. The team arrived in Los Angeles to a rousing greeting.

== Opts for Pakistan ==
At the time of partition of India in 1947, he was serving as Hajj Officer to the Government of India and stationed at Delhi. After partition, he opted for the newly established country Pakistan and served as a diplomat. His last posting was Pakistan's ambassador to Iraq.

== See also ==
- List of Indian hockey captains in Olympics
- Field hockey in India
- لال شاہ بخاری

Olympic Games
Preceded by Purma Bannerjee	Flagbearer for India; Los Angeles 1932	Succeeded by Dhyan Chand
