= Paul Massarek =

Austrian hockey player

Personal information
- Nationality: Austrian
- Born: 26 April 1901
- Died: 23 March 1962 (aged 60)

Sport
- Sport: Field hockey

Paul Massarek (26 April 1901 – 23 March 1962) was an Austrian field hockey player. He competed in the men's tournament at the 1928 Summer Olympics.
