= Hockey at the 1928 Olympics =

Hockey at the 1928 Olympics may refer to:

- Ice hockey at the 1928 Winter Olympics
- Field hockey at the 1928 Summer Olympics
