= National Sports Day =

Public holiday

National Sports Day is a public holiday celebrated in various countries to honour the national sports teams and sports traditions of those countries. On this day people from different age groups take a part in sports like kabaddi, marathon, basketball, hockey etc.

== National sports day by country ==
=== India ===
The National Sports Day in India is celebrated on 29 August, on the birth anniversary of hockey player Major Dhyan Chand. This day marks the birthday of Major Dhyan Chand Singh, the hockey player who won gold medals in Olympics for India in the years 1928, 1932 and 1936. He scored 400 goals in his total career, from 1926 - 1949 (according to his autobiography, Goals).

After putting his stamp on international hockey arena, and having served his country to reach of glory multiple times. He was a legendary figure in the Indian and world hockey. The most noted memorials for him were the Major Dhyan Chand Award, the highest award for lifetime achievement in sports and games in India, and the National Sports Day celebrations on his birthday. Major Dhyan chand learnt the game of hockey from his coach Pankaj Gupta. There is no one who has reached his level in hockey. The birth anniversary of hockey legend Major Dhyan Chand is on 29 August 1905.

=== Iran ===
In Iran, October 17 is known as Physical Education & Sport day, and from October 17 to 23 the week is named Physical Education & Sport Week. The main goal is presentation of importance of exercise in personal and social life of people and also has been emphasized in article III of the constitution.

=== Japan ===
Japan's Health and Sports Day (体育の日, Tai-iku no Hi) is a national holiday commemorated in October. It was first held on 10 October 1966, the second anniversary of the opening of the 1964 Summer Olympics held in Tokyo. Since 2000 it has been held on the second Monday of October.

=== Malaysia ===
National Sports Day (Malay: Hari Sukan Negara) is a national holiday in Malaysia, held annually on the second Saturday in October, with the main objective of promoting a healthy lifestyle among its population. The first National Sports Day was held in 2015.

=== Qatar ===
National Sports Day is a national holiday in Qatar, held annually on the second Tuesday in February, with the main objective of promoting fitness and a healthy lifestyle among its population through various activities. The first National Sports Day was held in 2012. For its 15th edition in 2026, the Prime Minister and Foreign Minister attended events organized by the Qatar Sports Federation for Persons with Special Needs, and diplomatic staff from Qatar's embassies and consulates around the world also marked the event. The Minister of Public Health also attended events.

=== Bahrain ===
The inaugural Bahraini Sports Day was commemorated on 7 February 2017, and since then this event is done every year in the second week of February between the dates 10-11-12-13, its about spreading different sports activities all over Bahrain by the order of the minister of ministries. Government sectors, as well as private sectors, companies, banks and, schools, contribute to the sports day by giving half duty to participate in the walkathon and activities. The main target of this day is supporting youth energies, and also to cheer up different ages to apply sports in their daily life, and moreover to have a healthy society.

=== South Korea ===
October is Sports Day (ko:스포츠의 날) in South Korea. It is not a public holiday but a commemoration day (ko:대한민국의 기념일) by Regulations on Commemoration Days.
