= Lambert Adelot =

Belgian field hockey player

Lambert Adelot (14 June 1898 – 9 December 1980) was a Belgian field hockey player who competed in the 1928 Summer Olympics and in the 1936 Summer Olympics. He was a member of the Belgian field hockey team which finished fourth in the 1928 Olympic tournament. He played all five matches as halfback. Eight years later he was part of the Belgian team which was eliminated in the first round of the 1936 Olympic tournament. He played all three matches.
