= Peter Koefoed =

Danish field hockey player

Peter Koefoed (22 April 1902 – 14 December 1983) was a Danish field hockey player who competed in the 1928 Summer Olympics. He was born in Soerabaja, Dutch East Indies and died in Grenaa.

In 1928 he was a member of the Danish team which was eliminated in the first round of the Olympic tournament after two wins and two losses. He played all four matches as back.
