= René Pellos =

French cartoonist

René Pellarin
Personal information
- Nationality: Swiss
- Born: 22 January 1900 Lyon, France
- Died: 8 April 1998 (aged 98) Mougins, France

Sport
- Sport: Field hockey

René Pellos (born René Marcel Pellarin, 22 January 1900, Lyon – 8 April 1998, Cannes) was a French artist, cartoonist and writer who worked in the Franco-Belgian bandes dessinées (BD) tradition. He also competed in the men's hockey tournament at the 1928 Summer Olympics, representing Switzerland.
