= Marcel Lachmann =

French field hockey player

Georges Marcel Lachmann (6 December 1908 – 15 December 1992) was a French field hockey player who competed in the 1928 Summer Olympics and in the 1936 Summer Olympics.

In 1928 he was part of the French field hockey team which was eliminated in the groups stage of the 1928 Olympic tournament. He played one match as halfback.

Eight years later he was a member of the French field hockey team, which finish fourth in the 1936 Olympic tournament. He played one match as halfback.

He was married to Marcelle Roques with whom he had 2 children: Jean and Francoise.
