= John Van Der Straeten =

Belgian hockey player

Personal information
- Nationality: Belgian

Sport
- Sport: Field hockey

John Van Der Straeten was a Belgian field hockey player. He competed in the men's tournament at the 1928 Summer Olympics.
