= Joseph Jastine =

Belgian field hockey player (1908–1987)

Josse Bastiné
Personal information
- Full name: Joseph Frédéric Paul Bastiné
- Nationality: Belgian
- Born: 27 April 1908 Saint-Gilles, Belgium
- Died: 31 January 1987 (aged 78) Etterbeek, Belgium

Sport
- Sport: Field hockey

Josse Bastiné (27 April 1908 – 31 January 1987) was a Belgian field hockey player. He competed in the men's tournament at the 1928 Summer Olympics.
