= Pierre Prieur (field hockey) =

French field hockey player

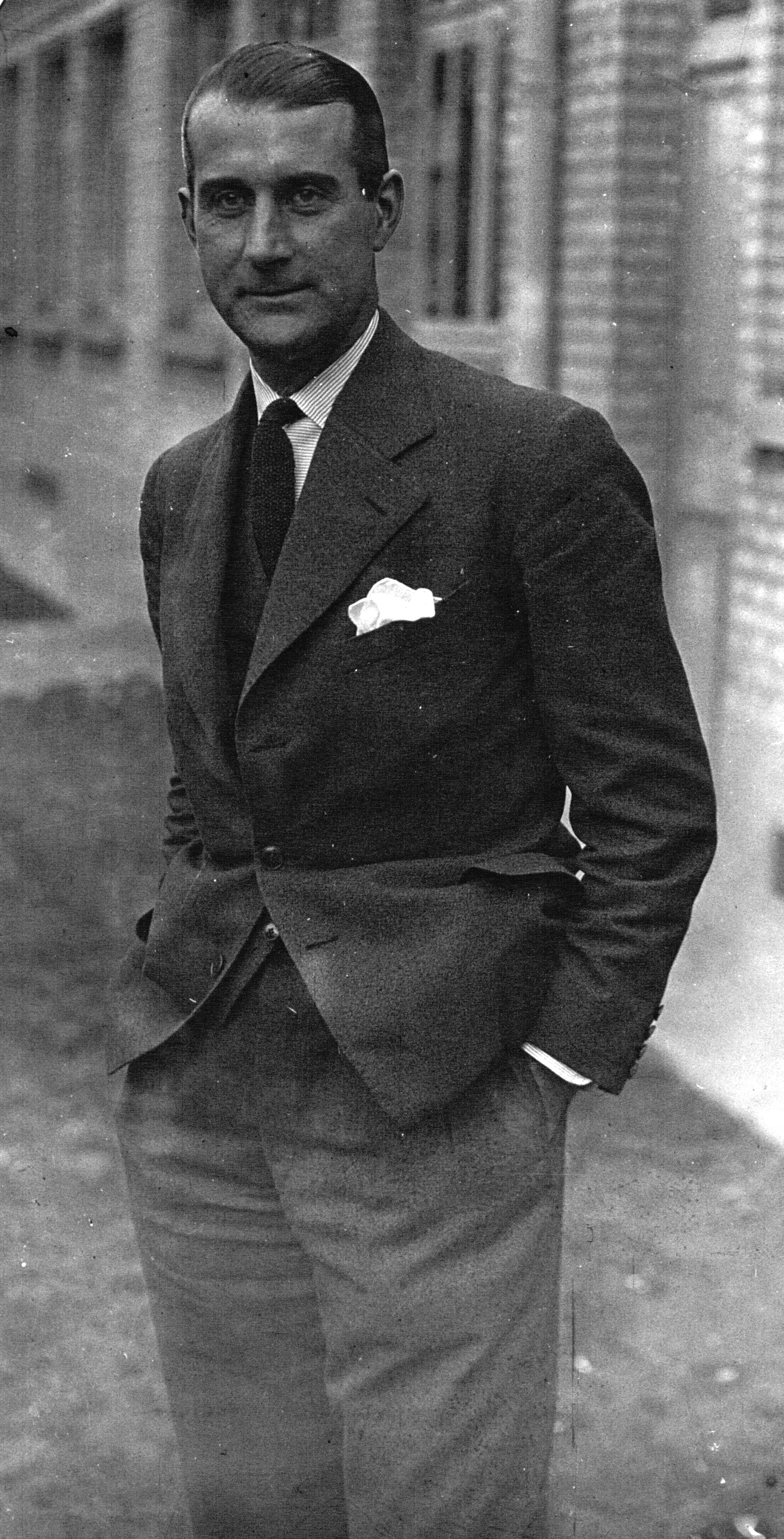
- Pierre Prieur in 1932

Personal information
- Nationality: French
- Born: 25 May 1896
- Died: 22 December 1968 (aged 72)

Sport
- Sport: Field hockey

Pierre Prieur (25 May 1896 – 22 December 1968) was a French field hockey player. He competed in the men's tournament at the 1928 Summer Olympics.
