= Louis De Deken =

Belgian hockey player

Personal information
- Nationality: Belgian
- Born: 15 May 1899
- Died: 16 December 1944 (aged 45)

Sport
- Sport: Field hockey

Louis De Deken (15 May 1899 – 16 December 1944) was a Belgian field hockey player. He competed in the men's tournament at the 1928 Summer Olympics.
