= Carlyle Tapsell =

Indian field hockey player (1909–1975)

Personal information
- Born: Carlyle Carrol Tapsell; July 24, 1909 Adra, Bengal Province, British India
- Died: September 6, 1975 (aged 66) Queensland, Australia

Sport
- Sport: Field hockey
Senior career
Years	Team	Caps	Goals
–	Bengal	-	-
National team
Years	Team	Caps	Goals
–	India		-
Medal record
Men's field hockey
Representing India
Olympic Games
Gold medal – first place	1932 Los Angeles	Team competition
Gold medal – first place	1936 Berlin	Team competition

Carlyle Carrol Tapsell (July 24, 1909 – September 6, 1975) was an Indian field hockey player who competed in the 1932 Summer Olympics and 1936 Summer Olympics. In 1932 he was a member of the Indian field hockey team, which won the gold medal. He played two matches as back. Four years later he was again a member of the Indian field hockey team, which won the gold medal. He played four matches as back. He was born in Adra, India.

== School ==
He studied in St. George's College, Mussoorie, India, which produced six Olympic hockey players (Earnest and William Goodsir-Cullen, George Marthins, Michael Gateley, Lionel Emmett, and Tapsell).
