= Claude Baudoux =

Belgian field hockey player (1898–1984)

Claudius "Claude" Baudoux (7 May 1898 – 17 November 1984) was a Belgian field hockey player who competed in the 1928 Summer Olympics. He was a member of the Belgian field hockey team which finished fourth in the 1928 Olympic tournament. He played all five matches as halfback.
