= Henri Peuchot =

French field hockey player

Personal information
- Nationality: French
- Born: 29 April 1889 Lille, Nord, France
- Died: 29 March 1978 (aged 88) Royat, Puy-de-Dôme, France

Sport
- Sport: Field hockey

Henri Peuchot (29 April 1889 – 29 March 1978) was a French field hockey player. He competed in the men's tournament at the 1928 Summer Olympics.
