= Hagbarth Dahlmann =

Danish field hockey player

Hagbarth Dahlman (né Andersen; January 15, 1901 – November 23, 1974) was a Danish field hockey player who competed in the 1928 Summer Olympics.

He was born in Copenhagen and died in Aarhus.

In 1928 he was a member of the Danish team which was eliminated in the first round of the Olympic tournament after two wins and two losses. He played all four matches as goalkeeper.
