= Georges Grosjean =

Belgian field hockey player

Georges Grojean
Personal information
- Full name: Georges Yvan Oscar Grojean
- Nationality: Belgian
- Born: 5 September 1905 Uccle, Belgium
- Died: 29 December 1968 (aged 63) Brussels, Belgium

Sport
- Sport: Field hockey

Georges Grojean (5 September 1905 – 29 December 1968) was a Belgian field hockey player. He competed in the men's tournament at the 1928 Summer Olympics.
