= Carl Koning =

Belgian field hockey player

Personal information
- Nationality: Belgian
- Born: 22 June 1897

Sport
- Sport: Field hockey

Carl Koning (born 22 June 1897, date of death unknown) was a Belgian field hockey player. He competed in the men's tournament at the 1928 Summer Olympics.
