= Auguste Goditiabois =

Belgian field hockey player

Personal information
- Nationality: Belgian
- Born: 20 November 1886
- Died: 16 November 1946 (aged 59)

Sport
- Sport: Field hockey

Auguste Goditiabois (20 November 1886 – 16 November 1946) was a Belgian field hockey player. He competed in the men's tournament at the 1928 Summer Olympics.
