= René Mallieux =

Belgian field hockey player

René Mallieux (15 November 1906 – 9 June 1995) was a Belgian field hockey player who competed in the 1928 Summer Olympics.

He was born in Liège.

Mallieux was a member of the Belgian field hockey team which finished fourth in the 1928 Olympic tournament. He played two matches as forward.
