= Robert Salarnier =

French hockey player

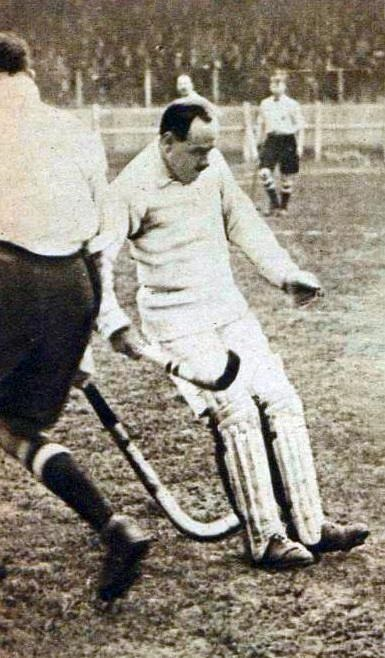
- Robert Salarnier in 1923

Personal information
- Nationality: French
- Born: 20 July 1890 Saint-Mandé, France
- Died: 10 April 1967 (aged 76) Nice, France

Sport
- Sport: Field hockey

Robert Salarnier (20 July 1890 – 10 April 1967) was a French field hockey player. He competed in the men's tournament at the 1928 Summer Olympics.
