= Georges Arlin =

French field hockey player

Personal information
- Nationality: French
- Born: 17 May 1902 Écully, France
- Died: 27 January 1992 (aged 89) Villeurbanne, France

Sport
- Sport: Field hockey

Georges Arlin (17 May 1902 – 27 January 1992) was a French field hockey player. He competed in the men's tournament at the 1928 Summer Olympics.
