= Corneille Wellens =

Belgian field hockey player

Corneille "Cornelis" Henri Albert Wellens (14 July 1905 – 9 October 1994) was a Belgian field hockey player who competed in the 1928 Summer Olympics and in the 1936 Summer Olympics.

Wellens was a member of the Belgian field hockey team which finished fourth in the 1928 Olympic tournament. He played all five matches as back.

Eight years later he was part of the Belgian team which was eliminated in the first round of the 1936 Olympic tournament. He played all three matches.

He was the captain of the national team from 1934 to 1936.

At national level he played for the clubs La Rasante (Woluwe-Saint-Lambert) and Royal Léopold Club (Uccle).

== Honours ==
Belgian Hockey League:

- 1925-26 (La Rasante)
- 1928-29 (La Rasante)
- 1929-30 (La Rasante)
- 1930-31 (La Rasante)
- 1936-37 (La Rasante)
- 1938-39 (Royal Léopold Club)

Belgian Cup:

- 1928-29 (La Rasante)
- 1929-30 (La Rasante)
- 1930-31 (La Rasante)

== Personal life ==
Wellens was born in Etterbeek on 14 July 1905. His father was a wood bulk importer in Etterbeek. He graduated as Civil Engineer from the Catholic University of Leuven.

Wellens married Marguerite du Castillon (grand-daughter of François Hoebeke, founder and owner of Top Bronnen), and was the father of banker Jean-Pierre Wellens (1935–2023), former director of ING Bank, of BBL, and of Brouwerij Haacht, president of the International Primary Market Association and co-creator of the Eurobonds.

Wellens died in Uccle on 9 October 1994, at the age of 89.
