= Freddy Cattoir =

Belgian field hockey player

Personal information
- Full name: Frédéric Philippe Louis Marie Cattoir
- Nationality: Belgian
- Born: 27 October 1906 Ixelles, Belgium
- Died: 16 February 1984 (aged 77) Uccle, Belgium

Sport
- Sport: Field hockey

Freddy Cattoir (27 October 1906 – 16 February 1984) was a Belgian field hockey player. He competed in the men's tournament at the 1928 Summer Olympics.
