= Carl Malling =

Danish field hockey player

Carl Thorwald Malling (23 May 1905 – 18 December 1993) was a Danish field hockey player who competed in the 1928 Summer Olympics and in the 1936 Summer Olympics.

He was born in Copenhagen and died in Maglegård, Gentofte.

In 1928 he was a member of the Danish team which was eliminated in the first round of the Olympic tournament after two wins and two losses. He played all four matches as back.

Eight years later he was eliminated with the Danish team in the first round of the 1936 Olympic tournament. He played one match.
