= Henry Madsen =

Danish field hockey player

Peter Henry Madsen (9 February 1900 – 12 November 1972) was a Danish field hockey player who competed in the 1928 Summer Olympics.

He was born in Helsingør and died in Copenhagen.

In 1928 he was a member of the Danish team which was eliminated in the first round of the Olympic tournament after two wins and two losses. He played one match as back.
