= Bernard Poussineau =

French field hockey player

Personal information
- Nationality: French
- Born: 28 April 1909 Paris, France
- Died: 21 March 1935 (aged 25) Roadstead of Brest, Finistère, France

Sport
- Sport: Field hockey

Bernard A. Poussineau (28 April 1909 – 21 March 1935) was a French field hockey player. He competed in the men's tournament at the 1928 Summer Olympics.

Poussineau died on 21 March 1935 when the French Naval Aviation Farman F.168 plane he was travelling on crashed into the roadstead of Brest, killing the six people on board, including Poussineau.
