= George Marthins =

Indian field hockey player (1905–1989)

Olympic medal record

Field hockey at the Summer Olympics

Representing India
Gold medal – first place	1928 Amsterdam	Team competition

George Eric McCarthy Marthins (24 December 1905 – 23 March 1989) was an Indian field hockey player who competed in the 1928 Summer Olympics as a member of the Indian field hockey team, which won the gold medal.

He studied at St. George's College, Mussoorie, India, which produced six Olympic hockey players (Earnest Goodsir-Cullen, William Goodsir-Cullen, Michael Gateley, Lionel Emmett, Carlyle Tapsell and Marthins himself).
