= José González (Spanish swimmer) =

Spanish swimmer

Personal information
- Born: 30 August 1906 Barcelona, Spain
- Died: 31 May 1997 (aged 90) Barcelona, Spain

Sport
- Sport: Swimming

José González (30 August 1906 – 31 May 1997) was a Spanish freestyle swimmer. He competed in two events at the 1928 Summer Olympics.
