= André Seeldrayers =

Belgian field hockey player

Personal information
- Nationality: Belgian
- Born: 23 January 1903

Sport
- Sport: Field hockey

André Seeldrayers (born 23 January 1903, date of death unknown) was a Belgian field hockey player. He competed in the men's tournament at the 1928 Summer Olympics, and finished in fourth place.
