= Heinz Förstendorf =

German field hockey player

Olympic medal record

Men's field hockey
Bronze medal – third place	1928 Amsterdam	Team competition

Heinz Förstendorf (28 December 1907 – 2 September 1988) was a German field hockey player who competed in the 1928 Summer Olympics. He was a member of the German field hockey team, which won the bronze medal. He played one match as forward.
