= Paul van de Rovaart =

Dutch field hockey player

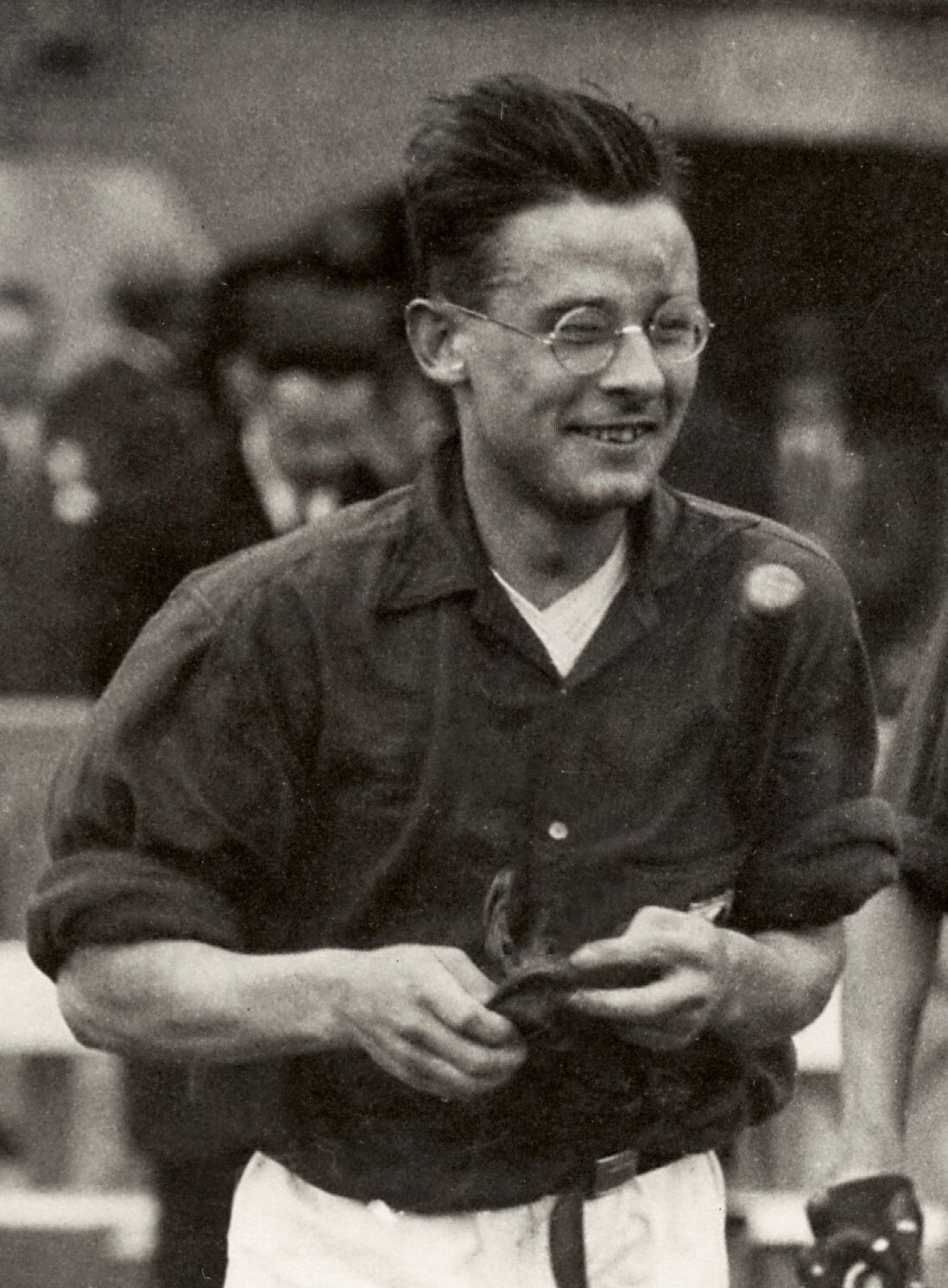
- Paul van de Rovaart in 1928

Medal record

Men's field hockey
Silver medal – second place	1928 Amsterdam	Team competition

Paulus ("Paul") van de Rovaart (24 January 1904 in Utrecht – 24 November 1995 in Ommen) was a Dutch field hockey player who competed in the 1928 Summer Olympics.

He was a member of the Dutch field hockey team, which won the silver medal. He played all four matches as forward and scored two goals.
