= Otto Muller von Czernicki =

Dutch field hockey player

Olympic medal record

Men's field hockey
Silver medal – second place	1928 Amsterdam	Team competition

Otto Ferdinand Muller von Czernicki, Jr (13 March 1909 in Magetan, Dutch East Indies – 1998) was a Dutch field hockey player who competed in the 1928 Summer Olympics. He had a professional career as agricultural engineer, was married to Lilie van Thiel (born 1913), and was the son of Otto Ferdinand Muller von Czernicki, Sr and Anna Catharina Cramer.

He was a squad member of the Dutch field hockey team, which won the silver medal in the 1928 Olympics. He was a reserve player and did not play a single match.

He played from 1926 to 1930 as back in the hockey teams of Bloemendaal, H.H.C (1930), the Netherlands National Student Hockey Team, and the Netherlands men's national field hockey team. He also played lawn tennis and rowed at WSR Argo in 1936.

After graduating in 1937 from Wageningen University with a degree in tropical agriculture, Muller von Czernicki eventually became the CEO of Rubber Cultuur Maatschappij "Amsterdam" (RCMA), now Amsterdam Commodities (Acomo), a company with thousands of employees that, until 1957 when Indonesia nationalized all plantations, primarily managed rubber and palm oil plantations.
