= Rolf Wollner =

German field hockey player

Olympic medal record

Men's field hockey
Bronze medal – third place	1928 Amsterdam	Team competition

Rolf Wollner (April 28, 1906 – July 6, 1988) was a German field hockey player who competed in the 1928 Summer Olympics.

He was a member of the German field hockey team, which won the bronze medal. He played one match as forward.
