= Jan Brand (field hockey) =

Dutch field hockey player

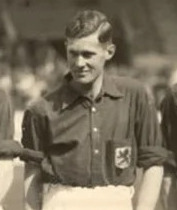
- Jan Brand in 1928

Medal record

Men's field hockey
Silver medal – second place	1928 Amsterdam	Team competition

Johannes "Jan" Willem Brand (24 June 1908 in Amsterdam – 29 June 1969 in Rotterdam) was a Dutch field hockey player who competed in the 1928 Summer Olympics.

He was a member of the Dutch field hockey team, which won the silver medal. He played all four matches as halfback.
