= Adriaan Katte =

Dutch field hockey player

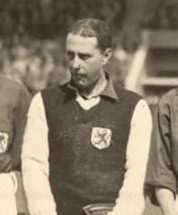
- Adriaan Katte in 1928

Medal record

Men's field hockey
| Silver medal – second place | 1928 Amsterdam | Team competition |

Adriaan Johan Louis Katte (24 June 1900 – 4 June 1991) was a Dutch field hockey player who competed in the 1928 Summer Olympics.

He was a member of the Dutch field hockey team, which won the silver medal. He played all four matches as goalkeeper.
