= Louis Prahm =

Danish field hockey player

Jean Louis Francois Philipsen Prahm (15 September 1912 – 4 December 2003) was a Danish field hockey player who competed in the 1936 Summer Olympics. Born in the Dutch East Indies.

He was the younger brother of Peter Prahm.

In 1936 he was a member of the Danish team which was eliminated in the group stage of the Olympic tournament. He played both matches as forward.
