= Werner Freyberg =

German field hockey player

Olympic medal record

Men's field hockey
Bronze medal – third place	1928 Amsterdam	Team competition

Werner Freyberg (29 July 1902 – 15 January 1973) was a German field hockey player who competed in the 1928 Summer Olympics. He was a member of the German field hockey team, which won the bronze medal. He played two matches as halfback.
