= Fernando García (fencer) =

Spanish fencer

Personal information
- Born: 10 October 1889 Madrid, Spain

Sport
- Sport: Fencing

Fernando García (born 10 October 1889, date of death unknown) was a Spanish fencer. He competed in the individual and team foil events at the 1928 Summer Olympics.
