= Ab Tresling =

Dutch field hockey player

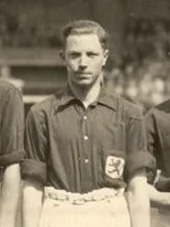
- Ab Tresling in 1928

Medal record

Men's field hockey
Silver medal – second place	1928 Amsterdam	Team competition

Albert "Ab" Willem Tresling (9 May 1909 in The Hague – 29 October 1980 in Breda) was a Dutch field hockey player who competed in the 1928 Summer Olympics.

He was a member of the Dutch field hockey team, which won the silver medal. He played all four matches as back and scored one goal.
