= Werner Proft =

German field hockey player

Olympic medal record

Men's field hockey
| Bronze medal – third place | 1928 Amsterdam | Team competition |

Werner Proft (12 August 1901 – 18 March 1989) was a German field hockey player who competed in the 1928 Summer Olympics.

He was a member of the German field hockey team, which won the bronze medal. He played three matches as back.
