= José María de Caralt =

Spanish field hockey player

Personal information
- Full name: José María de Caralt Mas; Josep Maria de Caralt i Mas
- Nationality: Spanish
- Born: 19 May 1907 Barcelona, Spain
- Died: 23 August 1981 (aged 74)

Sport
- Sport: Field hockey

José María de Caralt Mas (Note: In this Spanish name, the first or paternal surname is Caralt and the second or maternal family name is Mas.) (19 May 1907 – 23 August 1981), also known as Josep Maria de Caralt i Mas, was a Spanish field hockey player. He competed in the men's tournament at the 1928 Summer Olympics.
