= José de Chávarri =

Spanish hockey player (1897–1989)

Personal information
- Nationality: Spanish
- Born: 11 March 1897 Madrid, Spain
- Died: 21 January 1989 (aged 91) Madrid, Spain

Sport
- Sport: Field hockey

José de Chávarri (11 March 1897 – 21 January 1989) was a Spanish field hockey player. He competed in the men's tournament at the 1928 Summer Olympics.
