= Francisco Argemí =

Spanish field hockey player (1901–1971)

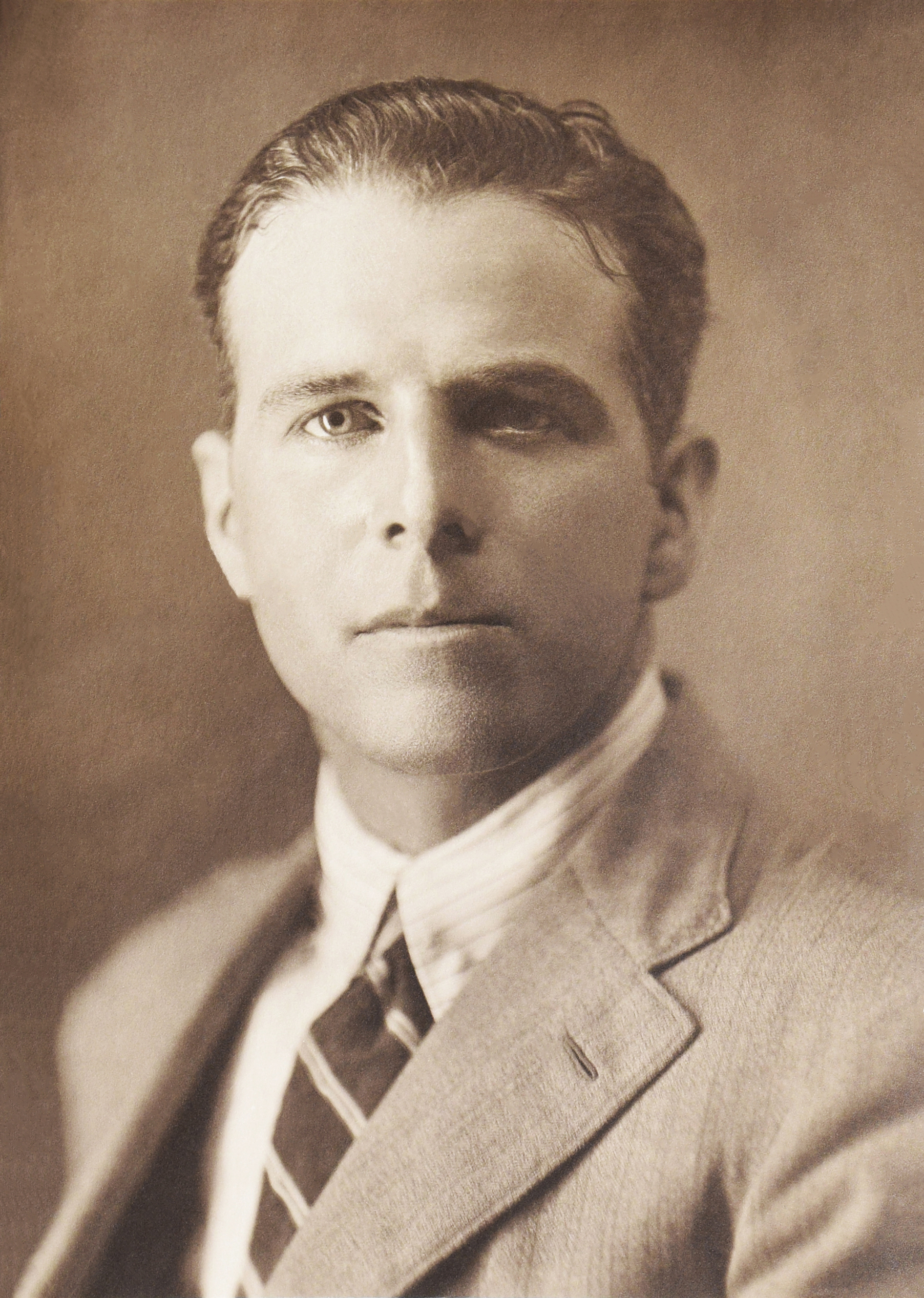

Personal information
- Nationality: Spanish
- Born: 24 March 1901
- Died: 28 July 1971 (aged 70)

Sport
- Sport: Field hockey

Francisco Argemí (24 March 1901 – 28 July 1971) was a Spanish field hockey player. He competed in the men's tournament at the 1928 Summer Olympics.
