= Niels Heilbuth =

Danish field hockey player

Niels Julius Heilbuth (October 8, 1906 – June 1, 1992) was a Danish field hockey player who competed in the 1928 Summer Olympics.

He was born in Copenhagen and died in Hørsholm.

In 1928 he was a member of the Danish team which was eliminated in the first round of the Olympic tournament after two wins and two losses. He played all four matches as forward and scored one goal.
