= Jan Ankerman =

Dutch field hockey player

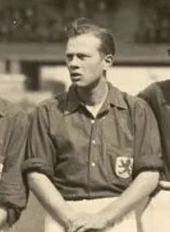
- Jan Ankerman in 1928

Medal record

Men's field hockey
Silver medal – second place	1928 Amsterdam	Team competition

Jan Geert Ankerman (March 2, 1906 in Wommels – December 27, 1942 in Rangoon, Burma) was a Dutch field hockey player who competed in the 1928 Summer Olympics. He was a member of the Dutch field hockey team, which won the silver medal. He played all four matches as halfback.

Ankerman died in a Japanese camp in Burma during World War II.
