= Georg Brunner =

German field hockey player

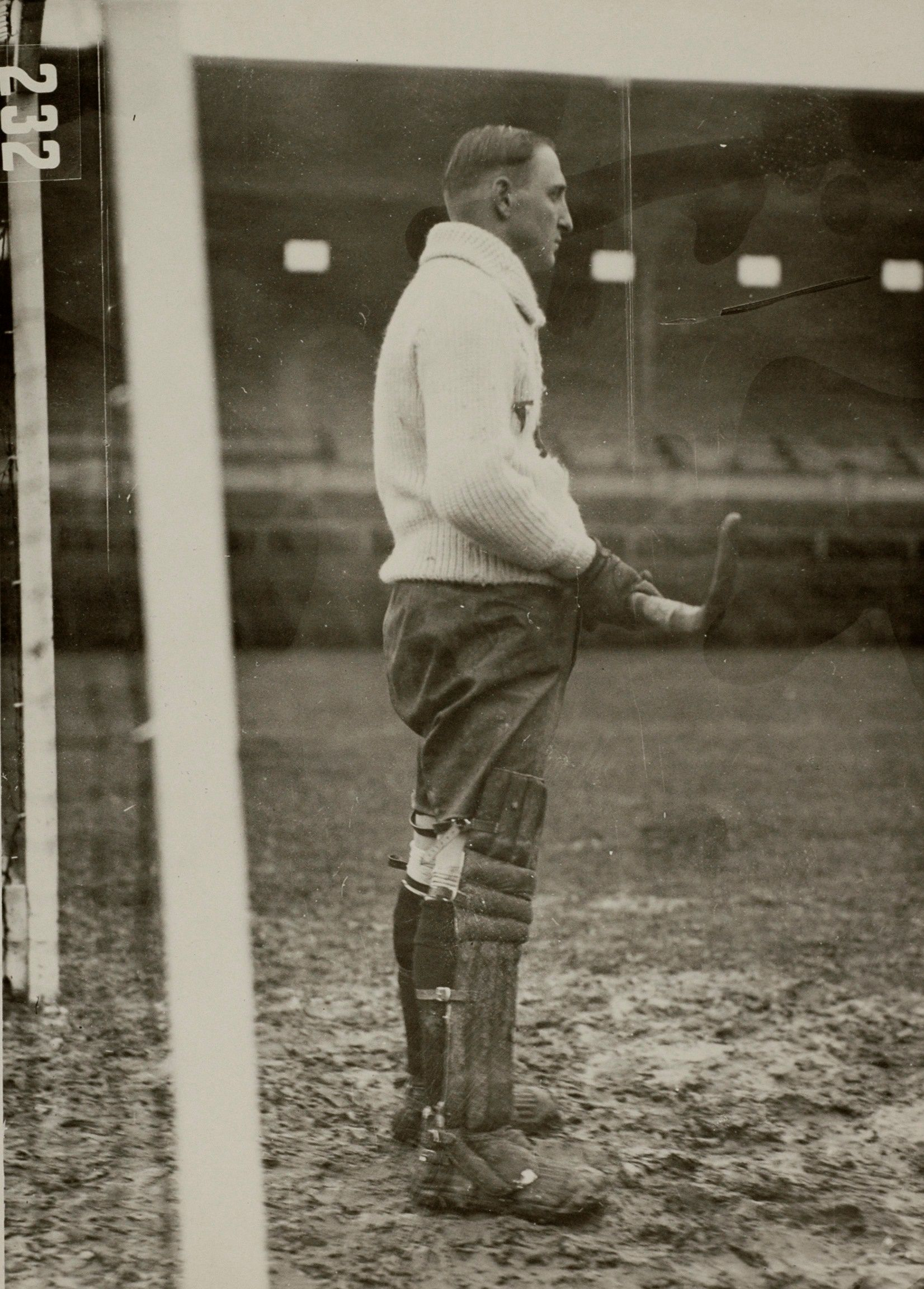

Medal record

Men's field hockey
| Bronze medal – third place | 1928 Amsterdam | Team competition |

Georg Brunner (15 December 1897 – 16 November 1959) was a German field hockey player who competed in the 1928 Summer Olympics.

He was a member of the German field hockey team, which won the bronze medal. He played all four matches as goalkeeper.
