= Fernando Torres-Polanco =

Spanish field hockey player (1898–1971)

Personal information
- Nationality: Spanish
- Born: 27 October 1898 Madrid, Spain
- Died: 30 July 1971 (aged 72) Barcelona, Spain

Sport
- Sport: Field hockey

Fernando Torres-Polanco (27 October 1898 – 30 July 1971) was a Spanish field hockey player. He competed in the men's tournament at the 1928 Summer Olympics. Spain had placed seventh overall, With Torres-Planco in their rooster.
