= Heinz Wöltje =

German field hockey player

Olympic medal record

Men's field hockey
Bronze medal – third place	1928 Amsterdam	Team competition

Heinz Wöltje (January 4, 1902 – September 26, 1968) was a German field hockey player who competed in the 1928 Summer Olympics.

He was a member of the German field hockey team, which won the bronze medal. He played three matches as back and scored one goal.
