= Peter Prahm =

Danish field hockey player

Peter Thal Philipsen Prahm (27 July 1908 – 23 May 2003) was a Danish field hockey player who competed in the 1928 Summer Olympics. He was born in the Dutch East Indies and was the older brother of Louis Prahm.

In 1928 he was a member of the Danish team which was eliminated in the first round of the Olympic tournament after two wins and two losses. He played all four matches as forward.
