= Hans Haußmann =

German field hockey player

Olympic medal record

Men's field hockey
Bronze medal – third place	1928 Amsterdam	Team competition

Hans Heinrich Haußmann (30 March 1900 – 1 September 1972) was a German field hockey player who competed in the 1928 Summer Olympics.

He was a member of the German field hockey team, which won the bronze medal. He played one match as back.
