= Louis Diercxsens =

Belgian field hockey player

Olympic medal record

Men's field hockey
Bronze medal – third place	1920 Antwerp	Team competition

Louis Jean Marie Corneille Diercxsens (28 September 1898 – 21 April 1992) was a Belgian field hockey player who competed in the 1920 Summer Olympics and in the 1928 Summer Olympics. In 1920, he was a member of the Belgian field hockey team, which won the bronze medal.

Eight years later, he finished fourth with the Belgian team at the 1928 Olympic tournament. He played all five matches as a forward and scored four goals.
