= Kurt Haverbeck =

German field hockey player

Olympic medal record

Men's field hockey
Bronze medal – third place	1928 Amsterdam	Team competition

Kurt Haverbeck (22 February 1899 – 16 March 1988) was a German field hockey player who competed in the 1928 Summer Olympics.

He was a member of the German field hockey team, which won the bronze medal. He played two matches as forward.
