= José de Caralt =

Spanish field hockey player (1907–1986)

Personal information
- Nationality: Spanish
- Born: 10 March 1907 Barcelona, Spain
- Died: 30 May 1986 (aged 79)

Sport
- Sport: Field hockey

José de Caralt (10 March 1907 – 30 May 1986) was a Spanish field hockey player. He competed in the men's tournament at the 1928 Summer Olympics.
