= Émile Vercken =

Belgian track and field athlete and field hockey player

Émile Vercken (9 February 1903 – 27 January 1943) was a Belgian track and field athlete and field hockey player who competed in the 1928 Summer Olympics. He was born in Bakhmut. He was a member of the Belgian field hockey team which finished fourth in the 1928 Olympic tournament. He played one match as forward and scored one goal. At the same Olympics he also participated as track and field athlete and was part of the Belgian relay team which was eliminated in the first round of the 4x100 metre relay event.
