= Yvon Baudoux =

Belgian hockey player (1896–1971)

Personal information
- Nationality: Belgian
- Born: 6 April 1894
- Died: 12 May 1969 (aged 75)

Sport
- Sport: Field hockey

Yvon Baudoux (6 April 1894 – 12 May 1969) was a Belgian field hockey player. He competed in the men's tournament at the 1928 Summer Olympics.
