= Santiago Goicoechea =

Spanish field hockey player (1905–1993)

Personal information
- Nationality: Spanish
- Born: 10 May 1905 Barcelona, Spain
- Died: 8 September 1993 (aged 88) Barcelona, Spain

Sport
- Sport: Field hockey

Santiago Goicoechea (10 May 1905 – 8 September 1993) was a Spanish field hockey player. He competed in the men's tournament at the 1928 Summer Olympics.
