= Jaime Bagúña =

Spanish field hockey player (1907–1994)

Personal information
- Nationality: Spanish
- Born: 23 December 1907 Barcelona, Spain
- Died: 2 December 1994 (aged 86) Barcelona, Spain

Sport
- Sport: Field hockey

Jaime Bagúña (23 December 1907 – 2 December 1994) was a Spanish field hockey player. He competed in the men's tournament at the 1928 Summer Olympics.
