= Paul Delheid =

Belgian field hockey player

Paul Charles Delheid (13 December 1909 – 6 July 1987) was a Belgian field hockey player who competed in the 1928 Summer Olympics and in the 1936 Summer Olympics. He was a member of the Belgian field hockey team which finished fourth in the 1928 Olympic tournament. He played all five matches as forward and scored one goal. Eight years later he was part of the Belgian team which was eliminated in the first round of the 1936 Olympic tournament. He played all three matches. He died in Opprebais, Walloon Brabant, Belgium.
