= Luis Isamat =

Spanish field hockey player (1900–1982)

Personal information
- Nationality: Spanish
- Born: 25 December 1900
- Died: 9 April 1982 (aged 81) Barcelona, Spain

Sport
- Sport: Field hockey

Luis Isamat (25 December 1900 – 9 April 1982) was a Spanish field hockey player. He competed in the men's tournament at the 1928 Summer Olympics.
