= Michael Gateley =

Indian field hockey player

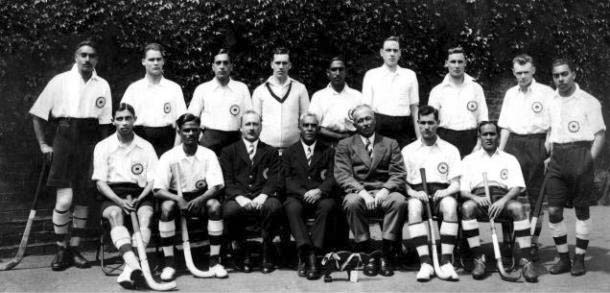
- India field hockey team at 1928 Olympics. Michael Gateley is standing eighth from left.

Personal information
- Born: 13 June 1904

Sport
- Sport: Field hockey
National team
Years	Team	Caps	Goals
1928	British India		-
Medal record
Men's Field Hockey
Representing India
Olympic Games
Gold medal – first place	1928 Amsterdam	Team competition
- Updated on 27 March 2024

Michael Anthony Gateley (13 June 1904 – ?) was an Indian field hockey player who competed in the 1928 Summer Olympics.

He remained a student of St George's College, Mussoorie, India. Five other former students of the same college, namely two brothers William Goodsir-Cullen (1928 Olympics) and Earnest Goodsir-Cullen (1936 Olympics), George Marthins (1928 Olympics), Carlyle Tapsell (1932 and 1936 Olympics) and Lionel Emmett (1936 Olympics) represented the British Indian team in hockey.

In 1928, Gateley was a member of the British Indian field hockey team which won the gold medal at Amsterdam.
