= Haas Visser 't Hooft =

Dutch field hockey player

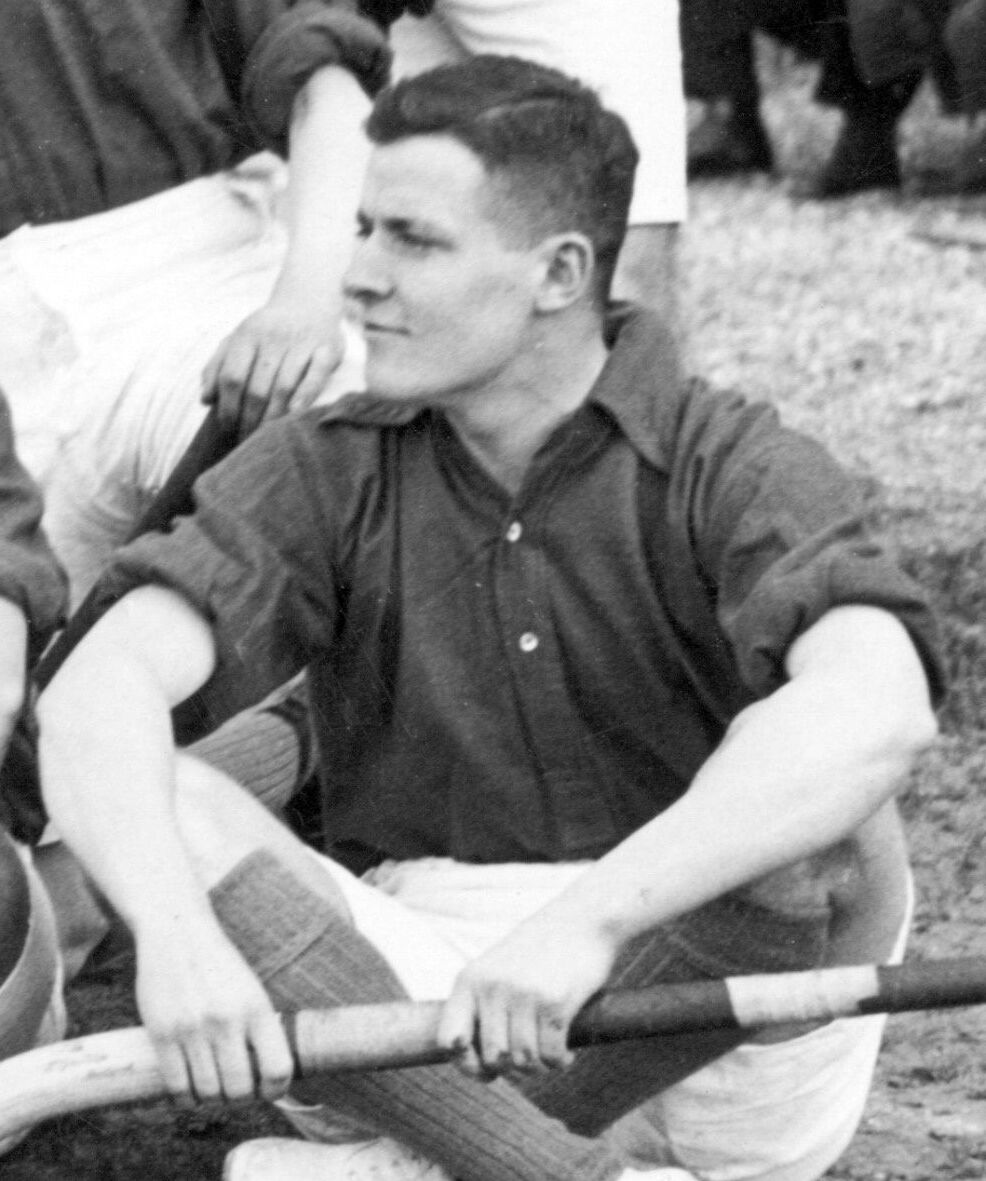
- Haas Visser 't Hooft in 1926

Medal record

Men's field hockey
Silver medal – second place	1928 Amsterdam	Team competition

Hendrik Philip "Haas" Visser 't Hooft (20 September 1905 in Haarlem – 28 July 1977 in Velp) was a Dutch field hockey player who competed in the 1928 Summer Olympics.

He was a member of the Dutch field hockey team, which won the silver medal. He played all four matches as forward.

Alongside his athletic career, Visser ’t Hooft later became a physician in Velp, Netherlands. He was also the brother of prominent theologian Willem Adolph Visser ’t Hooft, who served as the first Secretary General of the World Council of Churches from 1948 to 1966.
