= Luis Rierola =

Spanish field hockey player (1896–1970)

Personal information
- Nationality: Spanish
- Born: 1896 Barcelona, Spain
- Died: 1 September 1970 (aged 73–74) Barcelona, Spain

Sport
- Sport: Field hockey

Luis Rierola (1896 – 1 September 1970) was a Spanish field hockey player. He competed in the men's tournament at the 1928 Summer Olympics.
