= Gerrit Jannink =

Dutch field hockey player

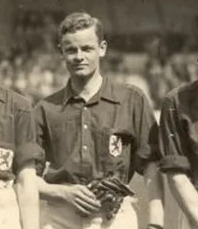
- Gerrit Jannink in 1928

Medal record

Men's field hockey
Silver medal – second place	1928 Amsterdam	Team competition

Gerrit Jan Arnold Jannink (1 December 1904 in Enschede – 7 March 1975 in Ross-on-Wye, Great Britain) was a Dutch field hockey player who competed in the 1928 Summer Olympics.

He was a member of the Dutch field hockey team, which won the silver medal. He played all four matches as forward and scored two goals.
