= Juan Becerril =

Spanish field hockey player (1903–1983)

Personal information
- Nationality: Spanish
- Born: 29 January 1903 Madrid, Spain
- Died: 6 January 1983 (aged 79) Madrid, Spain

Sport
- Sport: Field hockey

Juan Becerril (29 January 1903 – 6 January 1983) was a Spanish field hockey player. He competed in the men's tournament at the 1928 Summer Olympics.
