= August Kop =

Dutch field hockey player

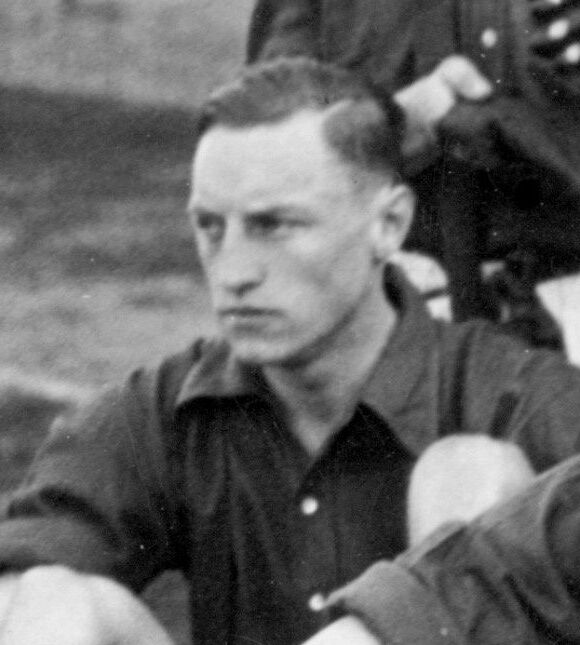
- August Kop in 1926

Medal record

Men's field hockey
Silver medal – second place	1928 Amsterdam	Team competition

August Johannes Kop (5 May 1904 in Purmerend – 30 April 1945 in Pekanbaru, Sumatra, Dutch East Indies) was a Dutch field hockey player who competed in the 1928 Summer Olympics. He was a member of the Dutch field hockey team, which won the silver medal. He played all four matches as forward.

He died in the Japanese concentration camp at Pakan Baroe building the Sumatra Railway.
