= Emile Duson =

Dutch field hockey player

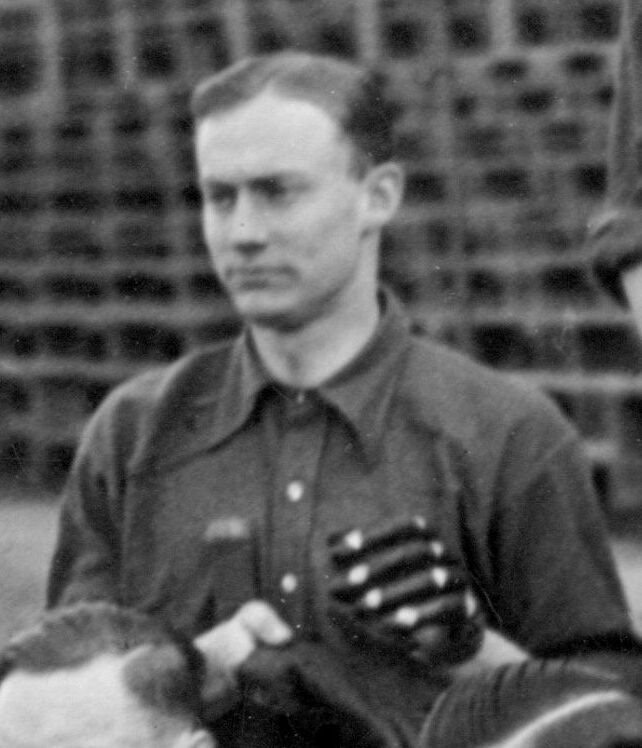
- Emile Duson in 1926

Medal record

Men's field hockey
Silver medal – second place	1928 Amsterdam	Team competition

Emile Paul Joseph Duson (December 1, 1904 in Semarang, Dutch East Indies – March 15, 1942 in Tiga Rungu, Sumatra, Dutch East Indies) was a Dutch field hockey player who competed in the 1928 Summer Olympics. He was a member of the Dutch field hockey team, which won the silver medal. He played all four matches as halfback.

He died in a Japanese concentration camp during World War II.
