= Fritz Horn =

German field hockey player

Olympic medal record

Men's field hockey
Bronze medal – third place	1928 Amsterdam	Team competition

Friedrich "Fritz" Horn (born 1909, date of death unknown) was a German field hockey player who competed in the 1928 Summer Olympics in which Germany beat Belgium 3-0 to earn the bronze medal.

He was a member of the German field hockey team, which won the bronze medal. He played two matches as forward.
