= Manuel Lobo =

Spanish field hockey player (1904–1983)

Personal information
- Nationality: Spanish
- Born: 11 May 1904 Barcelona, Spain
- Died: 17 February 1983 (aged 78) Barcelona, Spain

Sport
- Sport: Field hockey

Manuel Lobo (11 May 1904 – 17 February 1983) was a Spanish field hockey player. He competed in the men's tournament at the 1928 Summer Olympics.
