= Robert van der Veen =

Dutch field hockey player

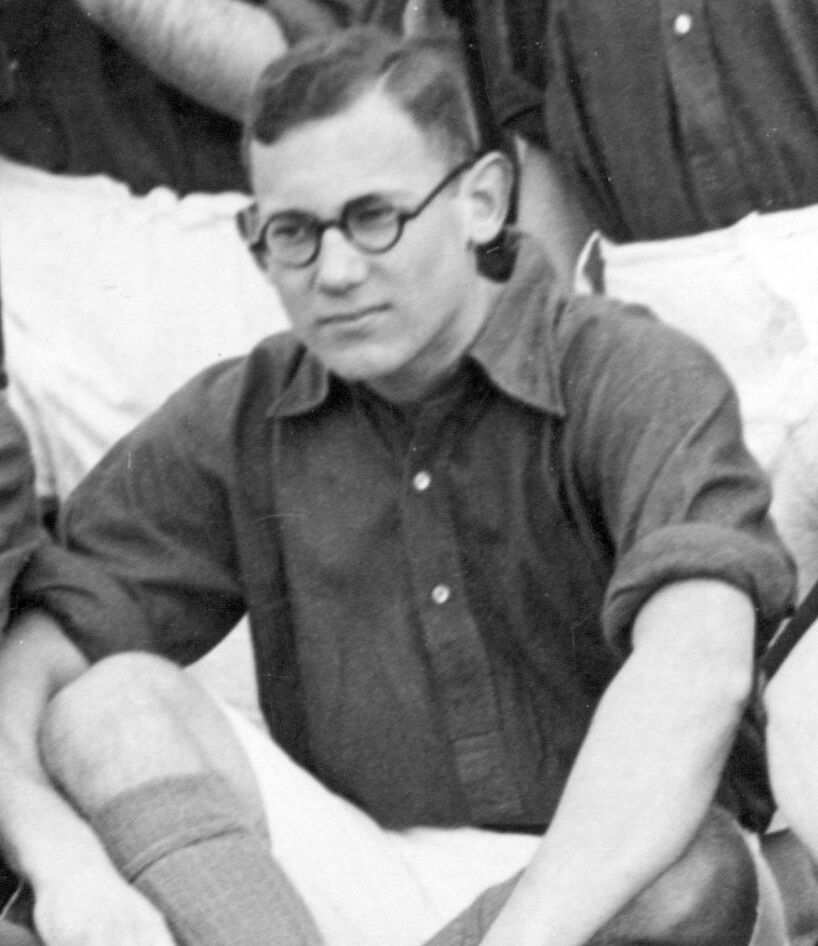
- Robert van der Veen in 1926

Medal record

Men's field hockey
Silver medal – second place	1928 Amsterdam	Team competition

Robert van der Veen (September 26, 1906 in Shanghai, Empire of China – March 18, 1996 in Jette, Belgium) was a Dutch field hockey player who competed in the 1928 Summer Olympics.

He was a member of the Dutch field hockey team, which won the silver medal. He played all four matches as forward and scored three goals.
