= Francisco De Roig =

Spanish field hockey player (1900–1953)

Personal information
- Nationality: Spanish
- Born: 22 May 1900 Barcelona, Spain
- Died: 21 July 1953 (aged 53)

Sport
- Sport: Field hockey

Francisco De Roig (22 May 1900 – 21 July 1953) was a Spanish field hockey player. He competed in the men's tournament at the 1928 Summer Olympics.
