= Félix Grimonprez =

French field hockey player

Félix Grimonprez (30 June 1910 – 26 May 1940) was a French field hockey player who competed in the 1928 Summer Olympics and in the 1936 Summer Olympics.

He was born in Lille.

In 1928 he was part of the French field hockey team which was eliminated in the groups stage of the 1928 Olympic tournament. He played all three matches as forward and scored one goal.

Eight years later he was a member of the French field hockey team, which finish fourth in the 1936 Olympic tournament. He played all five matches as halfback.

He was killed in action during World War II.
