= Bruno Boche =

German field hockey player

Olympic medal record

Men's field hockey
Bronze medal – third place	1928 Amsterdam	Team competition

Bruno "Benno" Boche (28 May 1897 in Berlin – 1 April 1972) was a German field hockey player who competed in the 1928 Summer Olympics.

He was a member of the German field hockey team, which won the bronze medal. He played three matches as a forward and scored one goal.
