= William Goodsir-Cullen =

Indian field hockey player (1907–1994)

- Born: 29 March 1907; Firozpur, British India
- Died: 15 June 1994 (aged 87); Wyoming, New South Wales, Australia
- Education: St. George's College, Mussoorie
- Relatives: Earnest Goodsir-Cullen

Olympic medal record

Field hockey at the Summer Olympics

Representing India
Gold medal – first place	1928 Amsterdam	Team competition

William James Goodsir-Cullen (29 March 1907 in Firozpur – 15 June 1994 in Wyoming, New South Wales, Australia) was an Indian field hockey player who competed in the 1928 Summer Olympics.

== Career ==
He was a member of the Indian field hockey team, which won the gold medal. He played three matches as halfback or forward.

His younger brother Earnest won the gold medal for India in the 1936 field hockey tournament.

William Goodsir-Cullen is unknown to most of today's hockey lovers. He was a great hockey personalities of the betimes era of Indian hockey. A key member of the Indian hockey team, William Goodsir-Cullen won the gold at Amsterdam in the 1928 Olympic Games. William "Willie" James Goodsir-Cullen was born on 29 March 1907 in Ferozepur District, India.

He was born to a family with a military background. His mother was a nurse in the army and his father was in British Army. From an early age, Willie and his younger brother Ernie were interested in hockey. The game soon became a passion for both the brothers. Joseph George Ulasterson was a good hockey player and had introduced hockey in Australia. This noted Australian player was a cousin brother of their mother. The stories of Ulasterson also helped a lot to increase their attraction to hockey.

The Cullen brothers from the years at St. George's College, Mussoorie, started captivating the headlines. In a span of 8 years, this college gave rise to 6 hockey Olympians. They were:

- 1928 - Willie Cullen, Michael Gateley, George Eric Marthins
- 1932 - Carlyle Tapsell
- 1936 - Ernie Cullen, Carlyle Tapsell, Lionel Emmett

In the year 1928 Willie delineated United Provinces in the inaugural National Hockey Championship. The championship was held at Calcutta (now Kolkata). He had shown his brilliant performance in the championship. Willie Cullen won a place in the Indian hockey team, which was preparing at the time for the 1928 Amsterdam Olympics for that.

His defence was attributed with the adjective 'rock-like defence' and confronting abilities proved to be a great help in stopping his opponents. This remains a key contribution to India's inaugural Olympic gold triumph.

Ernie carried on to play hockey after returning from Amsterdam, but could not get any other chance to represent the country. Ernest John Goodsir-Cullen, his younger brother, was elected for the Indian hockey team, which was played in the 1936 Berlin Olympics. In the 1936 field hockey tournament, Indian national team won the gold medal for India. Willie joined his uncle in his profession after retiring from active hockey, and thereafter also served in an oil company. Willie joined the Army, during World War II. Later he got posted to Canada. In or around 1950, Willie went to Australia and settled there. At the age of 91, he died in 1998 in New South Wales, Australia.

To show honour to Willie Cullen, his alma mater, St. George's College, Mussorie, has a 4-house system for their inter-class sports meets and the green house has been named after this Cullen brothers, is called the Cullen's' house.

External links

- William Goodsir-Cullen at Olympedia
- His Olympic Passport
- dataOlympics profile
- death notice
