= Rex Norris (field hockey) =

Indian field hockey player (1899–1980)

Olympic medal record

Field hockey at the Summer Olympics

Representing India
Gold medal – first place	1928 Amsterdam	Team competition

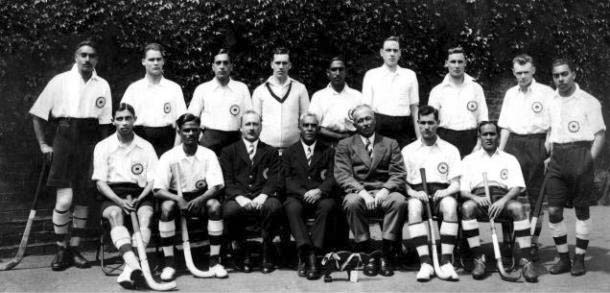
India hockey team 1928. Rex Norris is sitting at extreme left.

Reginald Alexander O. "Rex" Norris (18 July 1899 – September 1980) was an Indian field hockey player who competed in the 1928 Summer Olympics. Norris was born in an Anglo-Indian family, and grew up on a tea plantation in Chikmagalur, which was managed by his father James Norris. In 1928, he was a member of the British Indian field hockey team, which won the gold medal at the Olympic Games in Amsterdam.

Norris later became an international field hockey coach. He coached the Dutch field hockey team from 1954 to 1956, the Italian team in 1960 and the Mexican team before the 1968 Olympics. Norris' son Ron represented India as a light welterweight in the 1952 Helsinki Olympics. Norris' daughters Philomena and Wendy also represented India in field hockey.
