= Theodor Haag =

German field hockey player

Olympic medal record

Men's field hockey
Bronze medal – third place	1928 Amsterdam	Team competition

Theodor "Theo" Haag (13 March 1901 – 28 August 1956) was a German field hockey player who competed in the 1928 Summer Olympics.

He was a member and captain of the German field hockey team, which won the bronze medal. He played all four matches as forward and scored five goals.
