= Herbert Müller (field hockey) =

German field hockey player

Olympic medal record

Men's field hockey
Bronze medal – third place	1928 Amsterdam	Team competition

Herbert Müller (August 2, 1904 – December 7, 1966) was a German field hockey player who competed in the 1928 Summer Olympics. He was a member of the German field hockey team, which won the bronze medal. He played all four matches as forward and scored two goals.
