= Enrique de Chávarri =

Spanish sprinter and field hockey player

Personal information
- Nationality: Spanish
- Born: 10 January 1903 Madrid, Spain
- Died: 28 April 1993 (aged 90) Madrid, Spain

Sport
- Sport: Sprinting
- Event: 100 metres

Enrique de Chávarri (10 January 1903 – 28 April 1993) was a Spanish sprinter. He competed in the men's 100 metres at the 1928 Summer Olympics. He also played in the hockey tournament at the 1928 Summer Olympics.
