= Frederic Seaman =

Indian field hockey player (1906–2000)

- Born: Frederick Stephen Seaman; 2 January 1906; Allahabad, Uttar Pradesh, British India
- Died: 21 September 2000 (aged 94); Hershey, Pennsylvania

Medal record

Representing India

Olympic Games
Gold medal – first place	1928 Amsterdam	Team competition

Frederick Stephen Seaman (2 January 1906 – 21 September 2000) was an Indian field hockey player who won a gold medal as part of the Indian team in the 1928 Summer Olympics. Born to Thomas Henry Seaman, a police inspector, and his wife Martha Ann (O'Connor) Seaman, he later became a customs officer in British India. Frederick Seaman and his family left India after its independence in 1947, settling in Pennsylvania. He died at Hershey, Pennsylvania in 2000, age 94.
