= Michael Rocque =

Indian field hockey player (1899–1965)

Medal record

Representing India

Olympic Games
| Gold medal – first place | 1928 Amsterdam | Team competition |

Michael E. Rocque (1899 – 6 December 1965) was an Indian field hockey player who competed in the 1928 Summer Olympics.

In 1928 he was a member of the Indian field hockey team, which won the gold medal.
