= Bernabé de Chávarri =

Spanish field hockey player

Personal information
- Nationality: Spanish
- Born: 1 February 1904 Madrid, Spain

Sport
- Sport: Field hockey

Bernabé de Chávarri (1 February 1904 - 24 October 1980) was a Spanish field hockey player. He competed in the men's tournament at the 1928 Summer Olympics.
