= Sayed Yusuf =

Indian field hockey player

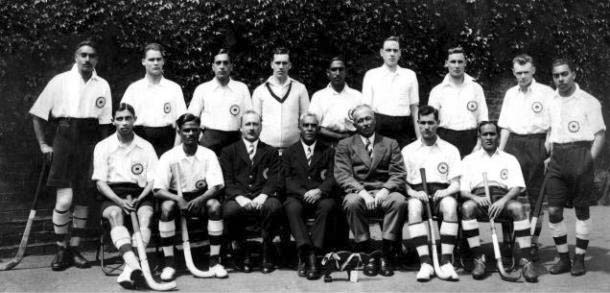
- India field hockey team at 1928 Olympics. Shahzada Muhammad Yusuf is standing third from left.

Personal information
- Full name: Shahzada Muhammad Yusuf
- Born: 1896
- Died: 9 December 1978 (aged 81–82)

Sport
- Sport: Field hockey
National team
Years	Team	Caps	Goals
1928	India		-
1934	Afghanistan	1	(0)
Medal record
Men's Field Hockey
Representing India
Olympic Games
Gold medal – first place	1928 Amsterdam	Team competition
- Updated on 30 March 2024

Sayed Muhammad Yusuf (abbr. S M Yusuf), later known as Shahzada Muhammad Yusuf (1896 – 9 December 1978) was a field hockey player who represented two countries namely India and Afghanistan in international hockey. In the 1928 Summer Olympics held at Amsterdam, he had participated as S M Yusuf.

== Entries at Olympedia ==
Yusuf has the following three entries at the website Olympedia:
19319 Sayed Yusuf
701504 Mohammad Yusuf
5000749 Sardar Mohammed Yusuf Khan

However, entry Sayed Yusuf is controversial because, according to official report of the 1928 Olympics, the Olympian had participated in those Olympics as S M Yusuf. His name Syed Yusuf appears to have been entered by Olympedia due to some other consideration such as from the Guinness Book of World Records. The valid reference can only be that of the official report of the 1928 Summer Olympics.

== India ==
He competed in the 1928 Summer Olympics at Amsterdam. When the Indian field hockey team for the 1928 Summer Olympics was selected, Yusuf was also selected in it without trials. At that time, he was in London. He studied at Fitzwilliam College, Cambridge (1923 to 1927). The Indian hockey team went to Amsterdam via London where he joined it. The Indian field hockey team won the gold medal at Amsterdam Olympics. Yusuf played four matches; one as right-out and three as left-half.

== Afghanistan ==
He was captain of the Afghanistan hockey team which took part in the Western Asiatic Games at Delhi in 1934.

He was also captain of the Afghanistan field hockey team at 1936 Summer Olympics in Berlin but remained a non-starter.

He was manager of Afghanistan field hockey team at 1948 Summer Olympics in London.

== Gallery ==
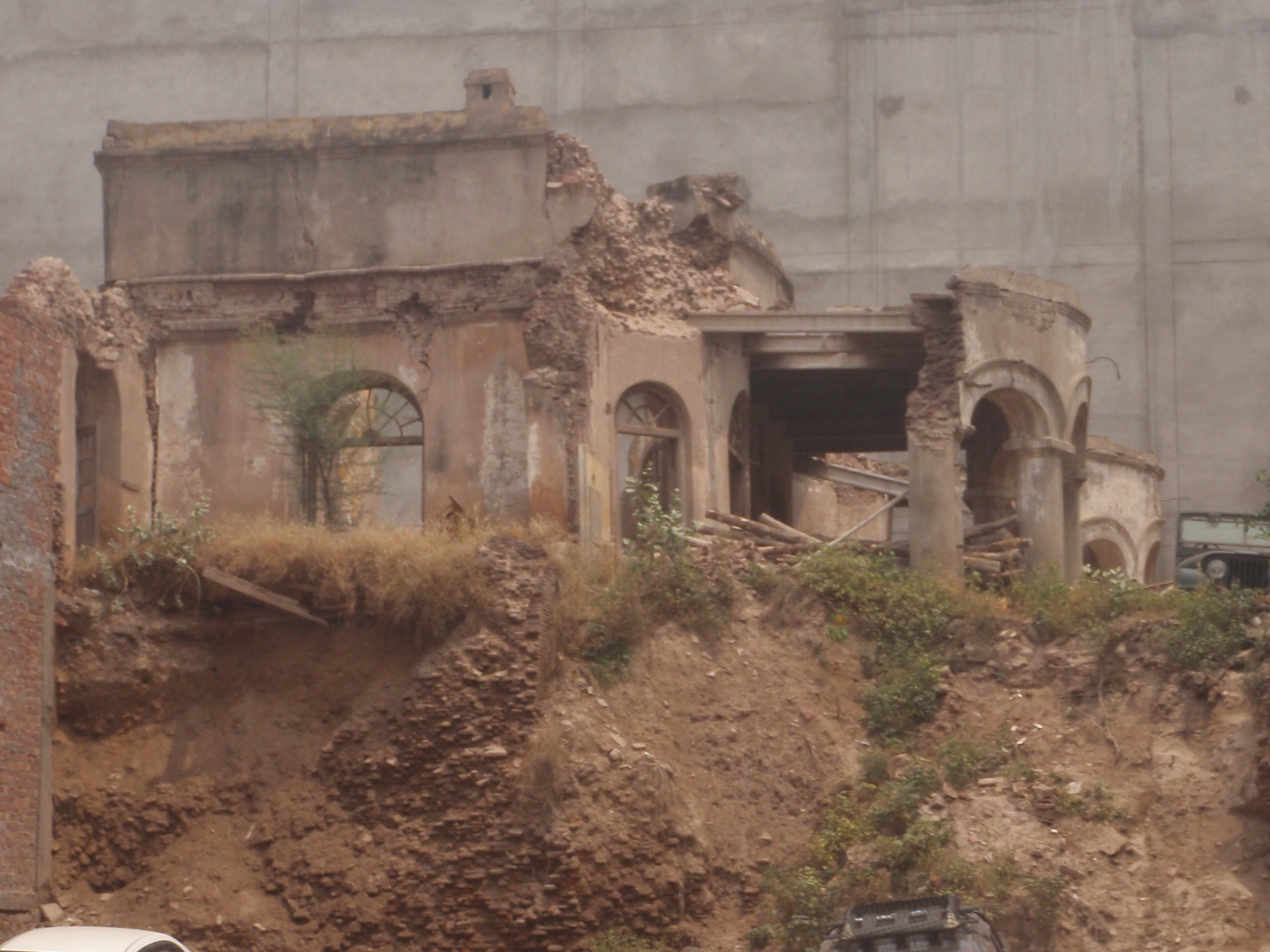
Bangla Ayub Shah in Lahore, Pakistan which once used to be the residence of Shahzada Muhammad Yusuf.

== See also ==
- List of sportspeople who competed for more than one nation
- Field hockey players who competed for more than one nation
