= Herbert Hobein =

German field hockey player

Olympic medal record

Men's field hockey
Bronze medal – third place	1928 Amsterdam	Team competition

Herbert Hobein (25 December 1906 – 16 December 1991) was a German field hockey player who competed in the 1928 Summer Olympics.

Hobein was a member of the German field hockey team, which won the bronze medal. He played three matches as forward and scored two goals.

Hobein was born on 25 December 1906 in Einbeck. He died on 16 December 1991 in Essen at the age of 84.
