= Shaukat Ali (field hockey) =

Indian field hockey player (1897–1960)

Olympic medal record

Field hockey at the Summer Olympics

Representing India
Gold medal – first place	1928 Amsterdam	Team competition

Shaukat Ali (6 October 1897 – 25 February 1960) was an Indian field hockey player who competed in the 1928 Summer Olympics.

He was a member of the Indian field hockey team, which won gold medal in the Olympic Games held at Amsterdam. He played three matches as forward and scored two goals.

After the partition of India, he migrated to Pakistan and served at the Sea Customs in Karachi.
