= Earnest Goodsir-Cullen =

Indian field hockey player (1912–1993)

Olympic medal record

Men's field hockey

Representing India
Gold medal – first place	1936 Berlin	Team competition

Earnest John Goodsir-Cullen (15 July 1912 – December 1993) was an Indian field hockey player who competed in the 1936 Summer Olympics.

In 1936, he was a member of the Indian field hockey team, which won the gold medal in Berlin. He played in all five matches as halfback.

== Personal life ==
Goodsir-Cullen was born in Kasauli, India and educated at St. George's College at Musoorie, and Madras University where he qualified as a medical doctor. During World War II he served as an officer in the Indian Army Medical Corps where he was attached to several different regiments and was posted to Iraq and Palestine on active service. In 1945, he married Captain Elsie Victoria Spratt, a QA officer in the British Army and their first son, Sean Patrick, was born in March 1946 in Poona. In 1947, the family went to live with Elsie's mother in Portstewart, County Londonderry, Northern Ireland and Ernest had to re-qualify as a doctor at Queen's University, Belfast.

After finishing his academic work in Belfast, Goodsir-Cullen took his family to London where he completed his training at the Westminster Hospital, which he also represented at hockey and, as by far the oldest player, at seven a side rugby where his pace on the wing was an asset. From London he took his family to Ipswich, Suffolk, where he had obtained a post as an assistant in a general practice. His second son, Niall Jonathan Martin, was born on 10 August 1951.

Goodsir-Cullen was contacted by a fellow graduate of Madras University whose medical practice was looking for another partner. He took his family to Middlesbrough where he worked as a GP in the practice for most of the next 35 years. His third son, Christopher Dermot, was born on 10 August 1959, coincidentally the birthday of Niall.

In 1980, Elsie died after a short illness. Two years later Goodsir-Cullen married Maud Elizabeth Lowe née Spratt, an elder sister of Elsie. In 1985 they moved to Portstewart where they were both active in golf and bowls until Ernest's death. Maud died in 2009.

His older brother William won a gold medal at the 1928 Summer Olympics as a member of Indian field hockey team.

== Playing career ==
Goodsir-Cullen continued playing hockey. At club level, he played for Portrush and Queen's University. He also played for Ulster and was asked to play at the 1952 Olympics for Ireland, 16 years after representing India in Berlin. Preparations for the Olympics clashed with Ernest's finals in Belfast, however, so he had to decline the invitation.
