= Leslie Hammond =

Indian field hockey player (1905–1955)

Olympic medal record

Field hockey at the Summer Olympics

Representing India
Gold medal – first place	1928 Amsterdam	Team competition
Gold medal – first place	1932 Los Angeles	Team competition

Leslie Charles Hammond (4 March 1905 – 26 June 1955) was an Indian field hockey player who competed in the 1928 Summer Olympics and 1932 Summer Olympics. In 1928, he was a member of the Indian field hockey team, which won the gold medal. He played three matches as back. Four years later, he was again a member of the Indian field hockey team, which won the gold medal. This time, he played one match as back. He was born in Madras, India.
