= Kehar Singh Gill =

Indian field hockey player

Olympic medal record

Field hockey at the Summer Olympics

Representing British India
Gold medal – first place	1928 Amsterdam	Team competition

Kehar Singh Gill was a British Indian field hockey player. He was part of the British India hockey team that won gold medal at the 1928 Summer Olympics.
