= Feroze Khan (field hockey) =

Field hockey player (1904–2005)

Personal information
- Born: 9 September 1904 Jalandhar, Punjab, British India
- Died: 21 April 2005 (aged 100) Karachi, Pakistan

Sport
- Sport: Field hockey
Senior career
Years	Team	Caps	Goals
–	Uttar Pradesh	-	-
–	Aligarh University	-	-
–	Bombay Customs	-	-
National team
Years	Team	Caps	Goals
1928	India		-
Medal record
Field hockey at the Summer Olympics
Representing India
Gold medal – first place	1928 Amsterdam	Field Hockey
- Updated on 27 March 2024

Feroze Khan (9 September 1904 – 21 April 2005) was a field hockey player who represented India at the Summer Olympic Games. At the time of his death, he was the world's oldest Olympic gold medal winner, following the death of US athlete James Rockefeller in 2004. Khan was part of India's Olympic hockey team at the 1928 Summer Olympics in Amsterdam, the Netherlands, who won the gold medal for the event. At the club level, Khan played for Uttar Pradesh, Aligarh University and the Bombay Customs. After his death, Roger Beaufrand of France became the oldest living Olympic gold medal winner.

Khan was a Daanishmandan Pathan. His son Farooq Feroze Khan, followed a career in the Air Force and became the only PAF officer ever to serve as Chairman Joint Chiefs of Staff Committee, Pakistan's senior military appointment.

After the creation of Pakistan, he moved to the new country, and lived in Karachi where he served as a well-respected coach. He died of natural causes at the age of 100.
