= Broome Pinniger =

Indian field hockey player (1902–1996)

Olympic medal record

Field hockey at the Summer Olympics

Representing India
Gold medal – first place	1928 Amsterdam	Team competition
Gold medal – first place	1932 Los Angeles	Team competition

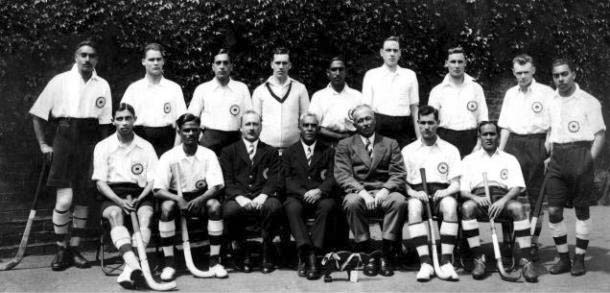
India hockey team 1928. Broome Eric Pinniger is sitting sixth from left.

Broome Eric Pinniger (28 December 1902 – 30 December 1996) was an Indian field hockey player.

== Early life ==
Pinniger was born in Saharanpur, India. He studied at Oak Grove School, Mussoorie, India.

== Participation in Olympics ==
He competed in the 1928 Summer Olympics and 1932 Summer Olympics.

In 1928, he was vice-captain of the Indian field hockey team which won the gold medal at Amsterdam. He played five matches as centre-half and scored one goal.

Four years later, he was again a member of the Indian field hockey team, which won the gold medal at Los Angeles. He played two matches as centre-half.
