= Field hockey at the 1928 Summer Olympics =

Coordinates: 52.3448°N 4.8591°E

Field hockey at the Games of the IX Olympiad
- Venues: Olympic Stadium; Old Stadion
- Dates: 17–26 May 1928
- Teams: 9

Medalists
1st place, gold medalist(s)		India
2nd place, silver medalist(s)		Netherlands
3rd place, bronze medalist(s)		Germany

The 1928 Summer Olympics saw the third field hockey tournament at Olympics. All games took place either in the new Olympisch Stadion or in the nearby Old Stadion. The field hockey tournament was held (together with football) in the first part of this Olympic games. All matches were played between Thursday, May 17 and Saturday, May 26, 1928.

The entry rules allowed one team from each country, with 22 players per team. The "Fédération Internationale de Hockey" defined the amateur status as follows: An amateur is one who has never obtained any profit by practicing the sport, neither directly or indirectly. If a player or an official accepts from club, association, or federation an amount exceeding what is strictly necessary for traveling and hotel expenses, such an amount will be regarded as profit.

Only a men's competition occurred that year, and nine nations competed: Czechoslovakia withdrew before the draw.

== Results ==
=== Divisions ===
==== Division A ====
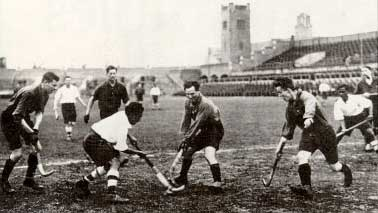
Match of the Indian hockey team

Pos	Team	Pld	W	D	L	GF	GA	GD	Pts	Qualification
1	India	4	4	0	0	26	0	+26	8	Gold medal match
2	Belgium	4	3	0	1	8	9	−1	6	Bronze medal match
3	Denmark	4	2	0	2	5	8	−3	4	
4	Switzerland	4	1	0	3	2	11	−9	2	
5	Austria	4	0	0	4	1	14	−13	0	

Source: 1928 Official Report, p. 685

17 May 1928
15:50

Switzerland	1–2	Denmark
Loubert ?'	Report	Husted 16'; Holst ?'

Umpires:
L. J. Quarles van Ufford (NED)
M. J. Vandekerckhove (BEL)

17 May 1928
17:00

India	6–0	Austria
Chand 4', 6', ?', ?'; Shaukat ?'; Gateley ?'	Report

Umpires:
Ch. Roux (FRA)
F. Schiff (NED)

18 May 1928
16:30

India	9–0	Belgium
Seaman 5', 55'; Marthins 19'; Khan 28', 29', 36', ?', ?'; Chand 31'	Report

Umpires:
W. Simon (GER)
T. Evekink (NED)

18 May 1928
19:00

Denmark	3–1	Austria
Holst 4', 6'; Heilbuth 34'	Report	Lichteneckert ?'

Umpires:
A. Broese van Croenou (NED)
R. Jassoy (GER)

20 May 1928
16:00

Belgium	3–0	Switzerland
Delheid 15'; Diercxsens 34'; Vercken 68'	Report

Umpires:
A. Broese van Croenou (NED)
F. Schiff (NED)

20 May 1928
16:00

India	5–0	Denmark
Chand 4', 26', 51', 54'; Seaman 65'	Report

Umpires:
R. Jassoy (GER)
J. Daubresse (FRA)

22 May 1928
15:00

India	6–0	Switzerland
Marthins 6'; Chand 26', 53', 55', 65'; Gateley ?'	Report

Umpires:
P. Reinberg (GER)
M. Masip Ubis (ESP)

22 May 1928
19:00

Belgium	4–0	Austria
Diercxsens ?', ?', ?'; Baudoux 68'	Report

Umpires:
E. W. C. Ricketts (IND)
B. Turnbull (IND)

24 May 1928
16:00

Denmark	0–1	Belgium
	Report	Seeldrayers 60'

Umpires:
W. Simon (GER)
R. Be-Cavin (SUI)

24 May 1928
18:00

Switzerland	1–0	Austria
Fehr ?'	Report

Umpires:
T. Evekink (NED)
P. Regibo (BEL)

==== Division B ====
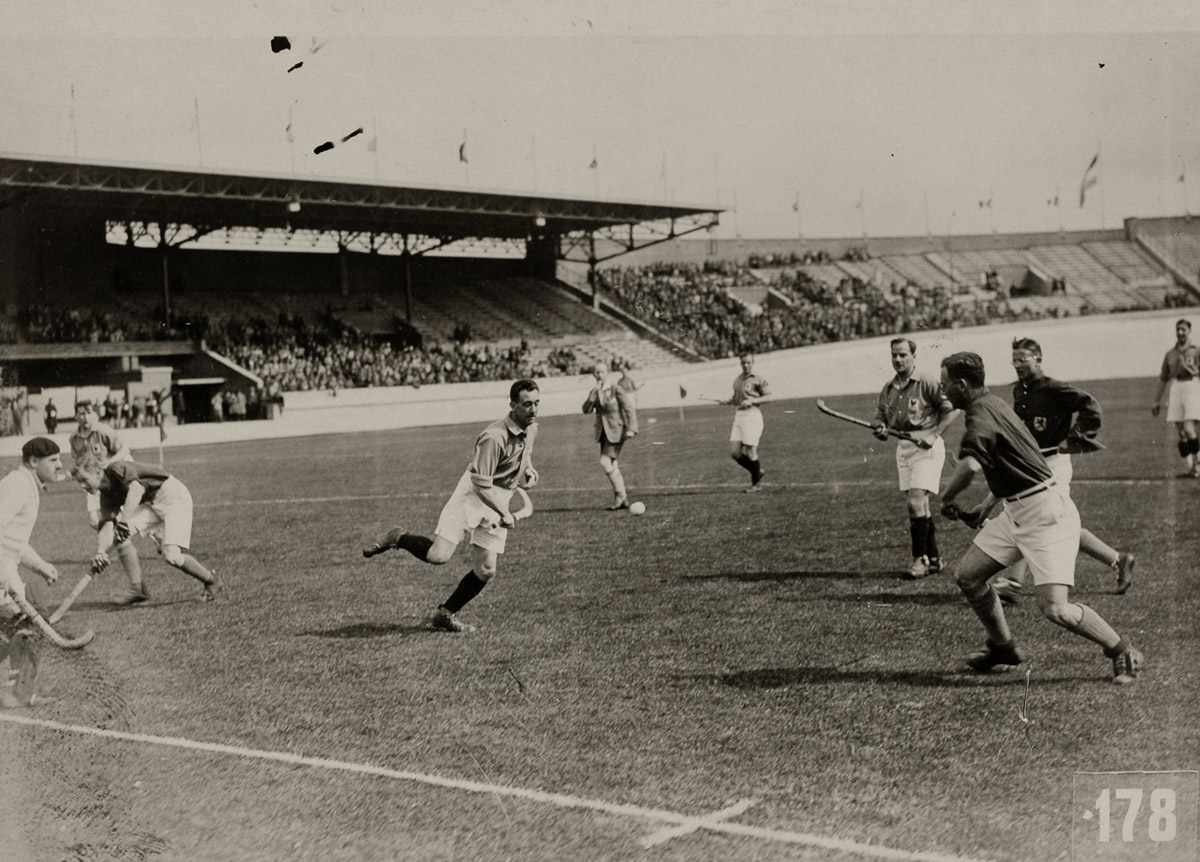
Match between France and the Netherlands

Pos	Team	Pld	W	D	L	GF	GA	GD	Pts	Qualification
1	Netherlands (H)	3	2	1	0	8	2	+6	5	Gold medal match
2	Germany	3	2	0	1	8	3	+5	4	Bronze medal match
3	France	3	1	0	2	2	8	−6	2	
4	Spain	3	0	1	2	3	8	−5	1	

Source: 1928 Official Report, p. 689
(H) Hosts

17 May 1928
15:15

Netherlands	5–0	France
Van de Rovaart 20'; Tresling 23'; Jannink 35', 37'; Van der Veen 65'	Report

Olympisch Stadion, Amsterdam
Attendance: 5,500
Umpires:
R. Liégeois (BEL)
E. de Cindric (HUN)

17 May 1928
19:30

Germany	5–1	Spain
Hobein 6', 34'; Boche 20'; Müller 33'; Haag 41'	Report	E. de Chávarri 40'

Olympisch Stadion, Amsterdam
Attendance: 1,300
Umpires:
E. W. C. Ricketts (IND)
P. Regibo (BEL)

19 May 1928
16:00

Netherlands	2–1	Germany
Van de Rovaart 20'; Van der Veen 32'	Report	Haag 7'

Olympisch Stadion, Amsterdam
Attendance: 6,000
Umpires:
R. Liégeois (BEL)
B. Turnbull (IND)

19 May 1928
19:00

France	2–1	Spain
Rivière 38'; Grimonprez 68'	Report	B. de Chávarri 29'

Olympisch Stadion, Amsterdam
Attendance: 500
Umpires:
C. Terrier (SUI)
C. Ch. Geyl (NED)

22 May 1928
16:30

Germany	2–0	France
Haag 10', 28'	Report

Old Stadium, Amsterdam
Attendance: 300
Umpires:
R. Liégeois (BEL)
E. de Cindric (HUN)

23 May 1928
16:45

Netherlands	1–1	Spain
Van der Veen 20'	Report	De Roig 63'

Old Stadium, Amsterdam
Attendance: 2,750
Umpires:
P. Regibo (BEL)
R. Be-Cavin (SUI)

== Medal round ==
=== Bronze medal match ===
26 May 1928
14:00

(bronze) Germany	3–0	Belgium
Haag ?', ?', ?'	Report

Olympisch Stadion, Amsterdam
Attendance: 23,400
Umpires:
B. Turnbull (IND)
W. C. Ricketts (IND)

=== Gold medal match ===
26 May 1928
15:45

(gold) India	3–0	Netherlands (silver)
Chand 15', 36'; Marthins ?'	Report

Olympisch Stadion, Amsterdam
Attendance: 40,000
Umpires:
w. Simon (GER)
R. Liégeois (BEL)

== Statistics ==
=== Final standings ===
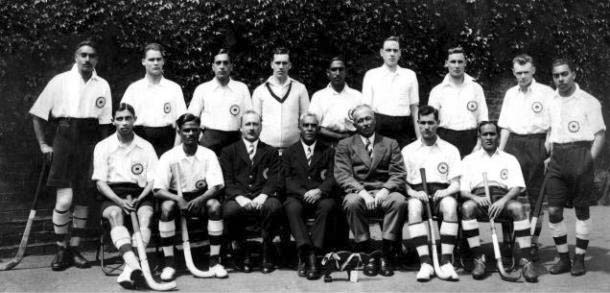
Team of India, Gold Medal winner

Rank	Team
1st place, gold medalist(s)	India
2nd place, silver medalist(s)	Netherlands
3rd place, bronze medalist(s)	Germany
4	Belgium
5	Denmark
5	France
7	Switzerland
7	Spain
9	Austria

=== Goalscorers ===
There were 69 goals scored in 18 matches, for an average of 3.83 goals per match.

15 goals

- (India) Dhyan Chand

7 goals

- (Germany) Theodor Haag

5 goals

- (India) Feroze Khan

4 goals

- (Belgium) Louis Diercxsens

3 goals

- (Denmark) Henning Holst
- (India) George Marthins
- (India) Frederic Seaman
- (Netherlands) Robert van der Veen

2 goals

- (Germany) Herbert Hobein
- (India) Michael Gateley
- (Netherlands) Gerrit Jannink
- (Netherlands) Paul van de Rovaart

1 goal

- (Austria) H. Lichtneckert
- (Belgium) Yvon Baudoux
- (Belgium) Paul Delheid
- (Belgium) André Seeldrayers
- (Belgium) Émile Vercken
- (Denmark) Niels Heilbuth
- (Denmark) Erik Husted
- (France) Félix Grimonprez
- (France) Jacques Rivière
- (Germany) Bruno Boche
- (Germany) Herbert Müller
- (India) Ali Shaukat
- (Netherlands) Ab Tresling
- (Spain) Bernabé de Chávarri
- (Spain) Enrique de Chávarri
- (Spain) Francisco de Roig
- (Switzerland) Konrad Fehr
- (Switzerland) J. Loubert

== Medal summary ==
Gold	Silver	Bronze
India; Richard Allen; Dhyan Chand; Michael Gateley; William Goodsir-Cullen; Leslie Hammond; Feroze Khan; George Marthins; Rex Norris; Broome Pinniger; Michael Rocque; Frederic Seaman; Ali Shaukat; Jaipal Singh (Captain); Shahzada Muhammad Yusuf Kehar Singh Gill	Netherlands; Jan Ankerman; Jan Brand; Rein de Waal; Emile Duson; Gerrit Jannink; Adriaan Katte; August Kop; Ab Tresling; Paul van de Rovaart; Robert van der Veen; Haas Visser 't Hooft C. J. J. Hardebeck; T. F. Hubrecht; G. Leembruggen; H. J. L. Mangelaar Meertens; Otto Muller von Czernicki; W. J. van Citters; C. J. van der Hagen; Tonny van Lierop; J. J. van Tienhoven van den Bogaard; J. M. van Voorst van Beest; N. Wenholt	Germany; Bruno Boche; Georg Brunner; Heinz Förstendorf; Erwin Franzkowiak; Werner Freyberg; Theodor Haag; Hans Haußmann; Kurt Haverbeck; Aribert Heymann; Herbert Hobein; Fritz Horn; Karl-Heinz Irmer; Herbert Kemmer; Herbert Müller; Werner Proft; Gerd Strantzen; Rolf Wollner; Heinz Wöltje; Erich Zander Fritz Lincke; Heinz Schäfer; Kurt Weiß

Note: The players above the line played at least one game in this tournament, the players below the line were probably only squad members. Nevertheless, the International Olympic Committee medal database exclusively credits them all as medalists. If or why they could have received medals is uncertain. However the National Olympic Committee of the Netherlands does not even show the Dutch players as competitors.
