= Football at the 1920 Summer Olympics – final =

1920 Summer Olympic Final
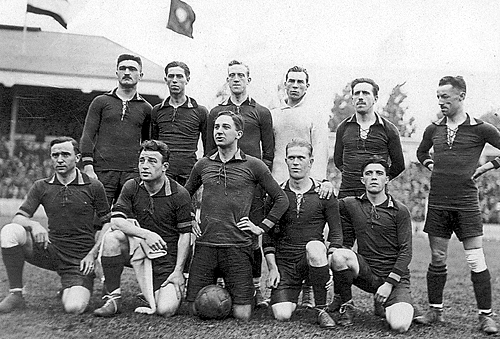
- Belgium team, winners
- Event: Football at the 1920 Summer Olympics
Belgium	Czechoslovakia
(Belgium)	(Czechoslovakia)
2	0
- Awarded
- Date: 2 September 1920
- Venue: Olympisch Stadion, Antwerp
- Referee: John Lewis (England)
- Attendance: 35,000

The 1920 Summer Olympic football gold medal match was a football match to determine the gold medal winners of men's football tournament at the 1920 Summer Olympics. The match was the third final of the men's football tournament at the Olympics, a quadrennial tournament contested by the men's national teams of the member associations of FIFA to decide the Olympic champions.

The final saw Belgium, the tournament's hosting team, play Czechoslovakia at the Olympisch Stadion in Antwerp, Belgium, on 2 September 1920.

The match is infamous for being abandoned in the 39th minute when Czechoslovakia walked off to protest the officiating after left-back Karel Steiner was sent off by English referee John Lewis for assaulting Belgian striker Robert Coppée. Belgium were declared Olympic champions, and Czechoslovakia were ejected from the competition.

== Background ==
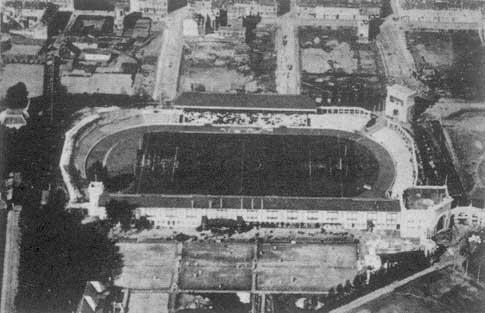
Olympisch Stadion in Antwerp hosted the final

The 1920 Olympic Games in general symbolised the return to peace after Belgium was under German occupation for four years during the First World War.

The 1920 Games held the first Olympiads to be played since 1912 in Stockholm, as the 1916 edition scheduled for Berlin was cancelled due to the war. Antwerp was awarded the Olympics unanimously in April 1919 in Lausanne, as it was the emblem of Belgian resistance during the German invasion of the country in 1914.

The defeated powers of the First World War - Germany, Austria, Hungary, the Ottoman Empire and Bulgaria - were all barred from attending the Games.

== Route to the final ==
Belgium		Round	Czechoslovakia
Opponent	Result	Main tournament	Opponent	Result
Bye		First round	Kingdom of SCS	7–0
Spain	3–1	Quarter-finals	Norway	4–0
Netherlands	3–0	Semifinals	France	4–1

Belgium received a bye in the first round. In the quarter-finals, they defeated Spain 3–1 with a Robert Coppée hat-trick. In the semifinals, Belgium beat archrivals the Netherlands 3–0 with goals from Henri Larnoe, Louis Van Hege and Mathieu Bragard.

Czechoslovkia had to play the first round, in which they vanquished 7–0 the Kingdom of SCS, and in the quarter-finals beat Norway 4–0. In the semi-finals, courtesy of three goals in the last 15 minutes of the match, they defeated France 4–1.

== Match ==
=== Summary ===
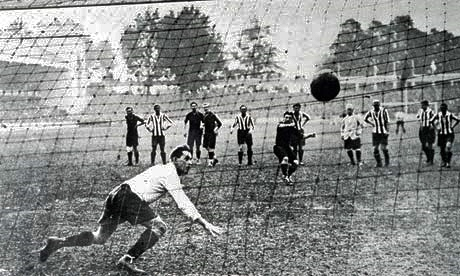
Belgian striker Robert Coppée opens the scoring of the final, with a penalty kick against goalkeeper Rudolf Klapka

The match between the two finalists was played on 2 September 1920 and was seen by 35,000 people. L'Auto's report of the following day read: "The stadium was full to bursting an hour before the match. The ticket desks were closed and a very large crowd waited in vain outside the gates" and estimated an attendance of 50,000 spectators at the Olympisch Stadion.

As the stadium was overfull, its gates had to be shut down, and thousands of people could not access. The environment with which the match began was described as "boiling". Belgium resisted to the first Czechoslovaks attacks and at the sixth minute of play, the referee awarded a penalty to the Belgians for handball; Robert Coppée gave Belgium the lead.

The decision of 65-year old English referee John Lewis to assign the penalty followed a strong protest by the Czechoslovaks because of an earlier foul on goalkeeper Rudolf Klapka. The game saw many fouls committed and the referee was described as "not up to the game." In the 30th minute, Henri Larnoe made it 2–0.

In the 39th minute, Czechoslovakia left back Karel Steiner was sent off by Lewis for assaulting Coppèe. Czech captain Karel Pešek promptly followed Steiner off the pitch in disgust, which led the other nine Czech players to walk off as well.

=== Details ===
2 September 1920
17:30

Belgium	2–0	Czechoslovakia
Coppée 6' (pen.); Larnoe 30'	Report

Olympic Stadium, Antwerp
Attendance: 35,000
Referee: John Lewis (GBR)

Belgium	Czechoslovakia

GK	Jean De Bie
RB	Armand Swartenbroeks
LB	Oscar Verbeeck
RH	Joseph Musch
CH	Emile Hanse (c)
LH	Andre Fierens
OR	Louis Van Hege
IR	Robert Coppée
CF	Mathieu Bragard
IL	Henri Larnoe
OL	Desire Bastin

GK	Rudolf Klapka
RB	Antonín Hojer
LB	Karel Steiner
RH	František Kolenatý
CH	Karel Pešek (c)
LH	Emil Seifert
OR	Josef Sedláček
IR	Antonín Janda
CF	Václav Pilát
IL	Jan Vaník
OL	Otakar Škvajn

== Aftermath ==
After the match was abandoned, celebrating Belgian spectators invaded the pitch and mocked the Czech players: the Belgian military situated inside the stadium barely managed to get the Czechs out safely. The Czechs requested the match be called off, but Belgium were declared winners, and Czechoslovkia were ejected from the competition.

The Czechoslovaks' behaviour was condemned by the International Olympic Committee (IOC) as unsporting. Three FIFA investigators were sent to report on what had happened, but the IOC's decision was confirmed.

To assign the silver and bronze medals, the IOC had decided that a knockout tournament would be played between the four teams beaten in the quarter-finals, and the winner of that tournament would play off in the semi-finals with the teams beaten in the main tournament by the gold medalists (Belgium), with the winners of these matches playing off for the medals. However, as Czechoslovakia had been ejected from the competition and Belgium had a first-round bye, the semi-finals were scratched, with Spain (the winner of the beaten quarter-finalists tournament) and the Netherlands (who had been beaten by Belgium in their semi-final) playing off for the silver and bronze medals.

Spain prevailed 3–1 over the Netherlands to win the silver medal, while the Oranje won their third consecutive bronze medal.

As of 2026, Belgium's 1920 Olympic gold medal still remains their only major trophy.
