= Netherlands national football team results (1920–1939) =

- Win Draw Loss

This is a list of the Netherlands national football team results from 1920 to 1939. Throughout this period they played in 112 matches.

The Netherlands participated in three Summer Olympics, in 1920, in 1924 and in 1928, reaching the semi-finals in 1920 where they lost to hosts and eventual champions Belgium, and in the repechage they reached the final where they disputed the silver medal against Spain (as the actual runner-up, Czechoslovakia, had been disqualified), but lost 1–3, thus winning the bronze medal for the second time. In 1924 they reached the semi-finals again, but lost again to the eventual champions Uruguay, and this time they failed to win Bronze with a 3–1 loss to Sweden, and finally, in 1928, they were knocked out again by the eventual champions Uruguay. The Netherlands also qualified through to two FIFA World Cups, the 1934 and 1938 editions, but failed to go any further than the round of 16 in both occasions.

== Results ==
=== 1920 ===
| 5 April 1920 Friendly | Netherlands | 2 – 0 | Denmark | Amsterdam, Netherlands |
| 14:30 (UTC+1:20) | B. Kessler 4' de Natris 71' | | | Stadium: Old Stadion; Attendance: 30000; Referee: Job Mutters (Netherlands) |

| 13 May 1920 Friendly | Italy | 1 – 1 | Netherlands | Genoa, Italy |
| 15:30 (UTC+2:00) | Sardi 88' | | D. Kessler 42' | Stadium: Campo Vittorio Marassi; Attendance: 12000; Referee: Eugène Stutz (Switzerland) |

| 16 May 1920 Friendly | Switzerland | 2 – 1 | Netherlands | Basel, Switzerland |
| 15:00 (UTC+2:00) | Sardi 88' | | Friederich 74'; Merkt 75' | Stadium: Landhof; Attendance: 5000; Referee: Giovanni Mauro (Italy) |

| 28 August 1920 1920 Summer Olympics, First Round | Netherlands | 3–0 | Luxembourg | Brussels, Belgium |
| 17:30 | J. Bulder 30'; Groosjohan 47', 85' | Report | | Stadium: La Butte; Attendance: 3000; Referee: Georges Hubrecht (Belgium) |

| 29 August 1920 1920 Summer Olympics, Quarter-final | Netherlands | 5–4 (a.e.t.) | Sweden | Antwerp, Belgium |
| 10:00 | Groosjohan 10', 57'; J. Bulder 44', 88' (pen.); De Natris 115' | Report | Karlsson 16', 32'; Olsson 20'; Dahl 72' | Stadium: Stadion Broodstraat; Attendance: 5000; Referee: Josef Fanta (Czechoslovakia) |

| 31 August 1920 1920 Summer Olympics, Semi-final | Belgium | 3–0 | Netherlands | Antwerp, Belgium |
| 17:25 | Larnoe 46'; Van Hege 55'; Bragard 85' | Report | | Stadium: Olympic Stadium; Attendance: 22,000; Referee: John Lewis (GBR) |

| 5 September 1920 1920 Summer Olympics, Silver medal match | Spain | 3–1 | Netherlands | Antwerp, Belgium |
| 15:00 | Sesúmaga 7', 35'; Pichichi 72' | Report | Groosjohan 68' | Stadium: Olympic Stadium; Attendance: 14,000; Referee: Paul Putz (Belgium) |

1920–1929
Win Draw Defeat
| M | Date | Opponent | Result | Event |
| 46 | 1920-04-05 | Denmark | 2–0 | Friendly |
| 47 | 1920-05-13 | Italy | 1–1 | Friendly |
| 48 | 1920-05-16 | Switzerland | 1–2 | Friendly |
| 49 | 1920-08-28 | Luxembourg | 3–0 | (Belgium) 1920 Summer Olympics |
| 50 | 1920-08-29 | Sweden | 5–4 | (Belgium) 1920 Summer Olympics |
| 51 | 1920-08-31 | Belgium | 0–3 | (Belgium) 1920 Summer Olympics |
| 52 | 1920-09-05 | Spain | 1–3 | (Belgium) 1920 Summer Olympics |
| 53 | 1921-03-26 | Switzerland | 2–0 | Friendly |
| 54 | 1921-05-08 | Italy | 2–2 | Friendly |
| 55 | 1921-05-15 | Belgium | 1–1 | Friendly |
| 56 | 1921-06-12 | Denmark | 1–1 | Friendly |
| 57 | 1921-11-13 | France | 0–5 | Friendly |
| 58 | 1922-03-26 | Belgium | 4–0 | Friendly |
| 59 | 1922-04-17 | Denmark | 2–0 | Friendly |
| 60 | 1922-05-07 | Belgium | 1–2 | Friendly |
| 61 | 1922-11-19 | Switzerland | 0–5 | Friendly |
| 62 | 1923-04-02 | France | 8–1 | Friendly |
| 63 | 1923-04-29 | Belgium | 1–1 | Friendly |
| 64 | 1923-05-10 | Germany | 0–0 | Friendly |
| 65 | 1923-11-25 | Switzerland | 4–1 | Friendly |
| 66 | 1924-03-23 | Belgium | 1–1 | Friendly |
| 67 | 1924-04-21 | Germany | 0–1 | Friendly |
| 68 | 1924-04-27 | Belgium | 1–1 | Friendly |
| 69 | 1924-05-27 | Romania | 6–0 | (France) 1924 Summer Olympics |
| 70 | 1924-06-02 | Irish Free State | 2–1 | (France) 1924 Summer Olympics |
| 71 | 1924-06-06 | Uruguay | 1–2 | (France) 1924 Summer Olympics |
| 72 | 1924-06-08 | Sweden | 1–1 | (France) 1924 Summer Olympics |
| 73 | 1924-06-09 | Sweden | 1–3 | (France) 1924 Summer Olympics |
| 74 | 1924-11-02 | South Africa | 2–1 | Friendly |
| 75 | 1925-03-15 | Belgium | 0–1 | Friendly |
| 76 | 1925-03-29 | Germany | 2–1 | Friendly |
| 77 | 1925-04-19 | Switzerland | 1–4 | Friendly |
| 78 | 1925-05-03 | Belgium | 5–0 | Friendly |
| 79 | 1925-10-25 | Denmark | 4–2 | Friendly |
| 80 | 1926-03-14 | Belgium | 1–1 | Friendly |
| 81 | 1926-03-28 | Switzerland | 5–0 | Friendly |
| 82 | 1926-04-18 | Germany | 4–2 | Friendly |
| 83 | 1926-05-02 | Belgium | 1–5 | Friendly |
| 84 | 1926-06-13 | Denmark | 4–1 | Friendly |
| 85 | 1926-10-31 | Germany | 2–3 | Friendly |
| 86 | 1927-03-13 | Belgium | 2–0 | Friendly |
| 87 | 1927-04-18 | Czechoslovakia Amateurs | 8–1 | Friendly |
| 88 | 1927-05-01 | Belgium | 3–2 | Friendly |
| 89 | 1927-06-12 | Denmark | 1–1 | Friendly |
| 90 | 1927-11-13 | Sweden | 1–0 | Friendly |
| 91 | 1927-11-20 | Germany | 2–2 | Friendly |
| 92 | 1928-03-11 | Belgium | 1–1 | Friendly |
| 93 | 1928-04-01 | Belgium | 0–1 | Friendly |
| 94 | 1928-04-22 | Denmark | 2–0 | Friendly |
| 95 | 1928-05-06 | Switzerland | 2–1 | Friendly |
| 96 | 1928-05-30 | Uruguay | 0–2 | (Netherlands) 1928 Summer Olympics |
| 97 | 1928-06-05 | Belgium | 3–1 | (Netherlands) 1928 Summer Olympics |
| 98 | 1928-06-08 | Chile | 2–2 | (Netherlands) 1928 Summer Olympics |
| 99 | 1928-06-14 | Egypt | 1–2 | Friendly |
| 100 | 1928-11-04 | Belgium | 1–1 | Friendly |
| 101 | 1928-12-02 | Italy | 3–2 | Friendly |
| 102 | 1929-03-17 | Switzerland | 3–2 | Friendly |
| 103 | 1929-05-05 | Belgium | 3–1 | Friendly |
| 104 | 1929-06-09 | Sweden | 6–2 | Friendly |
| 105 | 1929-06-12 | Norway | 4–4 | Friendly |
| 106 | 1929-11-03 | Norway | 1–4 | Friendly |
| 107 | 1930-04-06 | Italy | 1–1 | Friendly |
| 108 | 1930-05-04 | Belgium | 2–2 | Friendly |
| 109 | 1930-05-18 | Belgium | 3–1 | Friendly |
| 110 | 1930-06-08 | Hungary | 6–2 | Friendly |
| 111 | 1930-11-02 | Switzerland | 6–3 | Friendly |
| 112 | 1931-03-29 | Belgium | 3–2 | Friendly |
| 113 | 1931-04-26 | Germany | 1–1 | Friendly |
| 114 | 1931-05-03 | Belgium | 4–2 | Friendly |
| 115 | 1931-06-14 | Denmark | 2–0 | Friendly |
| 116 | 1931-11-29 | France | 3–4 | Friendly |
| 117 | 1932-03-29 | Belgium | 1–4 | Friendly |
| 118 | 1932-04-17 | Belgium | 2–1 | Friendly |
| 119 | 1932-05-08 | Irish Free State | 0–2 | Friendly |
| 120 | 1932-05-29 | Czechoslovakia | 1–2 | Friendly |
| 121 | 1932-12-04 | Germany | 2–0 | Friendly |
| 122 | 1933-01-22 | Switzerland | 0–2 | Friendly |
| 123 | 1933-03-05 | Hungary | 1–2 | Friendly |
| 124 | 1933-04-09 | Belgium | 1–3 | Friendly |
| 125 | 1933-05-07 | Belgium | 1–2 | Friendly |
| 126 | 1933-12-10 | Austria | 0–1 | Friendly |
| 127 | 1934-03-11 | Belgium | 9–3 | Friendly |
| 128 | 1934-04-08 | Irish Free State | 5–2 | (Italy) 1934 World Cup Qualifier |
| 129 | 1934-04-29 | Belgium | 2–4 | (Italy) 1934 World Cup Qualifier |
| 130 | 1934-05-10 | France | 4–5 | Friendly |
| 131 | 1934-05-27 | Italy | 2–3 | (Italy) 1934 World Cup Round of 16 |
| 132 | 1934-11-04 | Switzerland | 2–4 | Friendly |
| 133 | 1935-02-17 | Germany | 2–3 | Friendly |
| 134 | 1935-03-31 | Belgium | 4–2 | Friendly |
| 135 | 1935-05-12 | Belgium | 0–2 | Friendly |
| 136 | 1935-05-18 | England | 0–1 | Friendly |
| 137 | 1935-11-03 | Denmark | 3–0 | Friendly |
| 138 | 1935-12-08 | Irish Free State | 3–5 | Friendly |
| 139 | 1936-01-12 | France | 1–6 | Friendly |
| 140 | 1936-03-29 | Belgium | 8–0 | Friendly |
| 141 | 1936-05-03 | Belgium | 1–1 | Friendly |
| 142 | 1936-11-01 | Norway | 3–3 | Friendly |
| 143 | 1937-01-31 | Germany | 2–2 | Friendly |
| 144 | 1937-03-07 | Switzerland | 2–1 | Friendly |
| 145 | 1937-04-04 | Belgium | 2–1 | Friendly |
| 146 | 1937-05-02 | Belgium | 1–0 | Friendly |
| 147 | 1937-10-31 | France | 2–3 | Friendly |
| 148 | 1937-11-28 | Luxembourg | 4–0 | (France) 1938 World Cup Qualifier |
| 149 | 1938-02-27 | Belgium | 7–2 | Friendly |
| 150 | 1938-04-03 | Belgium | 1–1 | (France) 1938 World Cup Qualifier |
| 151 | 1938-05-21 | Scotland | 1–3 | Friendly |
| 152 | 1938-06-05 | Czechoslovakia | 3–0 | (France) 1938 World Cup Round of 16 |
| 153 | 1938-10-23 | Denmark | 2–2 | Friendly |
| 154 | 1939-02-26 | Hungary | 3–2 | Friendly |
| 155 | 1939-03-19 | Belgium | 5–4 | Friendly |
| 156 | 1939-04-23 | Belgium | 3–2 | Friendly |
| 157 | 1939-05-07 | Switzerland | 2–1 | Friendly |
