= Yugoslavia at the 1920 Summer Olympics =

- Flag of the Kingdom of Serbs, Croats and Slovenes
- IOC code: YUG
- NOC: Yugoslav Olympic Committee

in Antwerp
- Competitors: 15 in 1 sport
- Medals: Gold 0 Silver 0 Bronze 0 Total 0

Summer Olympics appearances (overview)
- 1920; 1924; 1928; 1932; 1936; 1948; 1952; 1956; 1960; 1964; 1968; 1972; 1976; 1980; 1984; 1988; 1992; 1996; 2000

Other related appearances
- Serbia (1912, 2008–); Croatia (1992–); Slovenia (1992–); Bosnia and Herzegovina (1992 S–); Independent Olympic Participants (1992 S); North Macedonia (1996–); Serbia and Montenegro (1996–2006); Montenegro (2008–); Kosovo (2016–)

Athletes from the Kingdom of Serbs, Croats and Slovenes competed at the 1920 Summer Olympics in Antwerp. It was the first Summer Olympics with Yugoslav athletes participating, appearing at every edition of the Games until Yugoslavia's dissolution in 1992. Eleven Yugoslav athletes participated in Belgium: only the football team – without the substitutes.

== Football ==
Yugoslavia competed in the Olympic football tournament for the first time. It lost both of its matches.

Team roster

- Andrija Kojić
- Nikola Simić
- Dragutin Vrđuka
- Vjekoslav Župančić
- Jaroslav Šifer
- Stanko Tavčar
- Slavin Cindrić
- Rudolf Rupec
- Dragutin Vragović
- Artur Dubravčić
- Branimir Porobić
- Emil Perška
- Ivan Granec
- Jovan Ružić
- Josip Šolc

First round

August 28, 1920

Czechoslovakia	7–0	Yugoslavia
Vanik 20' 46' 79'; Janda 34' 50' 75'; Sedláček 43'	Report

Broodstraat, Antwerp
Attendance: 600
Referee: Rafael van Praag (NED)

Consolation first round

September 2, 1920

Egypt	4–2	Yugoslavia
Abaza; Allouba; Hegazi	Report	Dubravčić; Ružić

Olympisch Stadion, Antwerp
Attendance: 500
Referee: Rafael van Praag (NED)

Final rank
14th
