= Egypt at the 1920 Summer Olympics =

Egypt's performance at the 1920 Summer Olympics

- IOC code: EGY
- NOC: Egyptian Olympic Committee

in Antwerp, Belgium 14 August–12 September 1920
- Competitors: 20 in 6 sports
- Flag bearer: Hamad Samy
- Medals: Gold 0 Silver 0 Bronze 0 Total 0

Summer Olympics appearances (overview)
- 1912; 1920; 1924; 1928; 1932; 1936; 1948; 1952; 1956; 1960–1964; 1968; 1972; 1976; 1980; 1984; 1988; 1992; 1996; 2000; 2004; 2008; 2012; 2016; 2020; 2024; 2028

Other related appearances
- 1906 Intercalated Games –––– United Arab Republic (1960, 1964)

Egypt competed at the 1920 Summer Olympics in Antwerp, Belgium.

== Athletics ==
Two athletes represented Egypt in 1920. It was the nation's debut in athletics. Neither of the two athletes were able to advance past the initial round in any of their events.

Ranks given are within the heat.

| Athlete | Event | Heats | | Quarterfinals | | Semifinals | | Final | |
| Athlete | Event | Result | Rank | Result | Rank | Result | Rank | Result | Rank |
|---|---|---|---|---|---|---|---|---|---|
| Abdel Ali Maghoub | 5000 m | N/A | | | | Unknown | 9 | did not finish | |
| Ahmed Khairy | 100 m | Unknown | 4 | did not finish | | | | | |
| Ahmed Khairy | 200 m | Unknown | 4 | did not finish | | | | | |
| Ahmed Khairy | 400 m | Unknown | 4 | did not finish | | | | | |

== Fencing ==
A single fencer represented Egypt in 1920. It was the nation's debut in the sport. Hassanein was eliminated in the quarterfinal round of each of his two events.

Ranks given are within the group.

| Fencer | Event | First round | | Quarterfinals | | Semifinals | | Final | |
| Fencer | Event | Result | Rank | Result | Rank | Result | Rank | Result | Rank |
|---|---|---|---|---|---|---|---|---|---|
| Ahmed Hassanein | Épée | 5–3 | 2 Q | 4–6 | 7 | did not advance | | | |
| Ahmed Hassanein | Foil | N/A | | 1–3 | 4 | did not advance | | | |

== Football ==
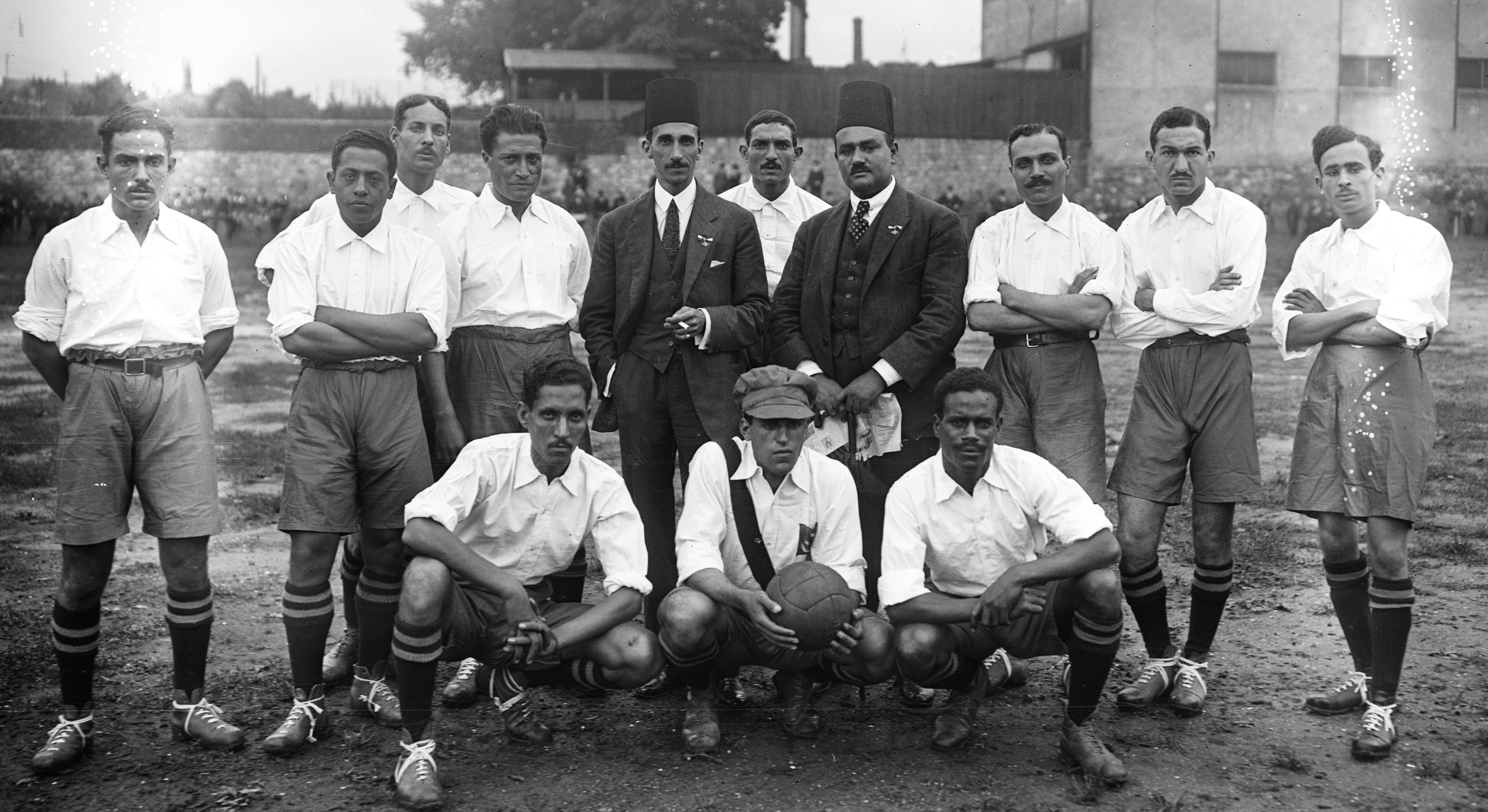
The Egyptian team in training for the tournament at Saint-Ouen-sur-Seine, 1 August 1920.

Egypt competed in the Olympic football tournament for the first time. The team lost their first match, against Italy. They also played a friendly game against Yugoslavia which they won.

Team Roster

- Kamel Taha
- Mohamed El-Sayed
- Abdel Salam Hamdy
- Riad Shawki
- Ali El-Hassany
- Gamil Osman
- Tewfik Abdullah
- Hussein Hegazi
- Hassan Allouba
- Sayed Abaza
- Zaki Osman
- Reserve: Khalil Hosni
- Reserve: Mohamed Gabr
- Reserve: Mahmoud S. Mokhtar
- Reserve: Abbas Safwat

First round

August 28, 1920

| Italy | 2–1 | Egypt |
|---|---|---|
| Baloncieri 25'; Brezzi 57' | Report | Osman 30' |

Jules Ottenstadion, Ghent
Attendance: 2,000
Referee: Paul Putz (BEL)

Friendly match

September 2, 1920

| Egypt | 4–2 | Yugoslavia |
|---|---|---|
| Abaza; Allouba; Hegazi | Report | Dubravčić; Ružić |

Olympisch Stadion, Antwerp
Attendance: 500
Referee: Rafael van Praag (ITA)

== Gymnastics ==
Two gymnasts represented Egypt in 1920. It was the nation's debut in the sport. The two Egyptian gymnasts finished in the last two places of the individual all-around.

=== Artistic gymnastics ===
| Gymnast | Event | Final | |
| Gymnast | Event | Result | Rank |
|---|---|---|---|
| Kabil Mahmoud | All-around | 63.30 | 24 |
| Ahmed Amin Tabouzada | All-around | 51.85 | 25 |

== Weightlifting ==
A single weightlifter represented Egypt in 1920. It was the nation's debut in the sport. Samy competed in the middleweight category, but did not finish the competition.

| Weightlifter | Weight class | Final | |
| Weightlifter | Weight class | Result | Rank |
|---|---|---|---|
| Ahmed Samy | 75 kg | did not finish | |

== Wrestling ==
A single wrestler competed for Egypt in 1920. It was the nation's debut in the sport. Rahmy competed in the Greco-Roman lightweight and the freestyle middleweight, losing his only match in each competition.

=== Freestyle ===
| Wrestler | Event | Round of 32 | Round of 16 | Quarterfinals | Semifinals | Finals / Bronze match | Rank |
|---|---|---|---|---|---|---|---|
| Ahmed Rahmy | Freestyle middle | Bye | Derkinderen (BEL) (L) | did not advance | | | 9 |

| Opponent nation | Wins | Losses | Percent |
|---|---|---|---|
| Belgium | 0 | 1 | .000 |
| Total | 0 | 1 | .000 |

| Round | Wins | Losses | Percent |
|---|---|---|---|
| Round of 32 | 0 | 0 | – |
| Round of 16 | 0 | 1 | .000 |
| Quarterfinals | 0 | 0 | – |
| Semifinals | 0 | 0 | – |
| Final | 0 | 0 | – |
| Bronze match | 0 | 0 | – |
| Total | 0 | 1 | .000 |

=== Greco-Roman ===
| Wrestler | Event | Round of 32 | Round of 16 | Quarterfinals | Semifinals | Finals | Rank |
| Wrestler | Event | Round of 32 | Round of 16 | Silver quarters | Silver semis | Silver match | Rank |
| Wrestler | Event | Round of 32 | Round of 16 | Bronze quarters | Bronze semis | Bronze match | Rank |
|---|---|---|---|---|---|---|---|
| Ahmed Rahmy | Lightweight | Rohon (FRA) (L) | Did not advance | did not advance | | | 18 |
| Ahmed Rahmy | Lightweight | Rohon (FRA) (L) | Did not advance | did not advance | | | 18 |
| Ahmed Rahmy | Lightweight | Rohon (FRA) (L) | Did not advance | did not advance | | | 18 |

| Opponent nation | Wins | Losses | Percent |
|---|---|---|---|
| France | 0 | 1 | .000 |
| Total | 0 | 1 | .000 |

| Round | Wins | Losses | Percent |
|---|---|---|---|
| Round of 32 | 0 | 1 | .000 |
| Round of 16 | 0 | 0 | – |
| Quarterfinals | 0 | 0 | – |
| Semifinals | 0 | 0 | – |
| Final | 0 | 0 | – |
| Silver quarterfinals | 0 | 0 | – |
| Silver semifinals | 0 | 0 | – |
| Silver match | 0 | 0 | – |
| Bronze quarterfinals | 0 | 0 | – |
| Bronze semifinals | 0 | 0 | – |
| Bronze match | 0 | 0 | – |
| Total | 0 | 1 | .000 |
