= 1920–21 in Belgian football =

Football in Belgium
- Season: 1920–21

The 1920–21 season was the 21st season of competitive football in Belgium.

== Overview ==
Daring Club de Bruxelles won the Division I. At the end of the season, only one club was relegated to the Promotion (Uccle Sport) and 3 clubs promoted to the Division I (Standard Club Liégeois, FC Malinois and SC Anderlechtois), so that the number of clubs in Division I increased from 12 to 14.

== National team ==
Date	Venue	Opponents	Score*	Comp	Belgium scorers	Match Report
August 29, 1920	Olympisch Stadion, Antwerp (H)	Spain	3-1	OQF	Robert Coppée (3)	FA website
August 31, 1920	Olympisch Stadion, Antwerp (H)	The Netherlands	3-0	OSF	Henri Larnoe, Louis Van Hege, Mathieu Bragard	FA website
September 2, 1920	Olympisch Stadion, Antwerp (H)	Czechoslovakia	2-0	OF	Robert Coppée, Henri Larnoe	FA website
March 6, 1921	Stade du Parc Duden, Brussels (H)	France	3-1	F	Mathieu Bragard (2), Louis Van Hege	FA website
May 5, 1921	Olympisch Stadion, Antwerp (H)	Italy	2-3	F	Henri Larnoe, Mathieu Bragard	FA website
May 15, 1921	Olympisch Stadion, Antwerp (H)	The Netherlands	1-1	F	Mathieu Bragard	FA website
May 21, 1921	Oscar Bossaert Stadium, Brussels (H)	England	0-2	F		FA website

* Belgium score given first

Key

- H = Home match
- A = Away match
- N = On neutral ground
- F = Friendly
- OQF = Summer Olympics quarter finals
- OSF = Summer Olympics semi-finals
- OF = Summer Olympics final
- o.g. = own goal

== Honours ==
Competition	Winner
Division I	Daring Club de Bruxelles
Promotion	Standard Club Liégeois

== Final league tables ==
=== Promotion ===
Pos	Team	Pld	Won	Drw	Lst	GF	GA	Pts	GD	Notes
1	Standard Club Liégeois	22	16	2	4	46	15	34	+31	Promoted to First Division.
2	FC Malinois	22	13	8	1	48	19	34	+29	Promoted to First Division.
3	SC Anderlechtois	22	12	5	5	63	25	29	+38	Promoted to First Division.
4	FC Liégeois	22	12	5	5	48	28	29	+20	
5	TSV Lyra	22	11	5	6	32	29	27	+3	
6	Berchem Sport	22	6	9	7	31	40	21	-9	
7	Stade Louvaniste	22	8	3	11	33	42	19	-9	
8	Tilleur FC	22	7	4	11	54	48	18	+6	
9	Léopold Club de Bruxelles	22	7	3	12	41	50	17	-9	
10	SC Courtraisien	22	6	4	12	22	42	16	-20	
11	FC de Bressoux	22	2	7	13	28	55	11	-27	
12	AEC Mons	22	3	3	16	22	75	9	-53	
