= Leo Dannin =

Danish footballer (1898-1971)

Personal information
- Date of birth: 26 March 1898
- Place of birth: Copenhagen, Denmark
- Date of death: 15 September 1971 (aged 73)
- Place of death: Frederiksberg, Denmark

International career
Years	Team	Apps	(Gls)
1920–1922	Denmark	9	(0)

Leo Dannin (26 March 1898 – 15 September 1971) was a Danish footballer who played for Kjøbenhavns Boldklub. He represented Denmark in the men's tournament at the 1920 Summer Olympics. Denmark were eliminated in the preliminary round.

== International career ==
Dannin made his debut for Denmark on 5 April 1920 in a 2–0 defeat to Netherlands. Later that year, he was part of his country's squad at the 1920 Olympic Football Tournament. Denmark was eliminated in the first round against Spain and finished as the ninth-best team of the 13 participants. (Note: 15 teams were supposed to participate in the tournament, with hosts and eventual winners Belgium receiving a bye to the second round. Czechoslovakia, the other finalists, forfeited their points due to controversy in the final. Switzerland withdrew before the tournament began.) Dannin played a total of nine times for Denmark, with his final match being played in April 1922 against the Netherlands.
