= John Lewis (referee) =

English footballer, administrator and referee

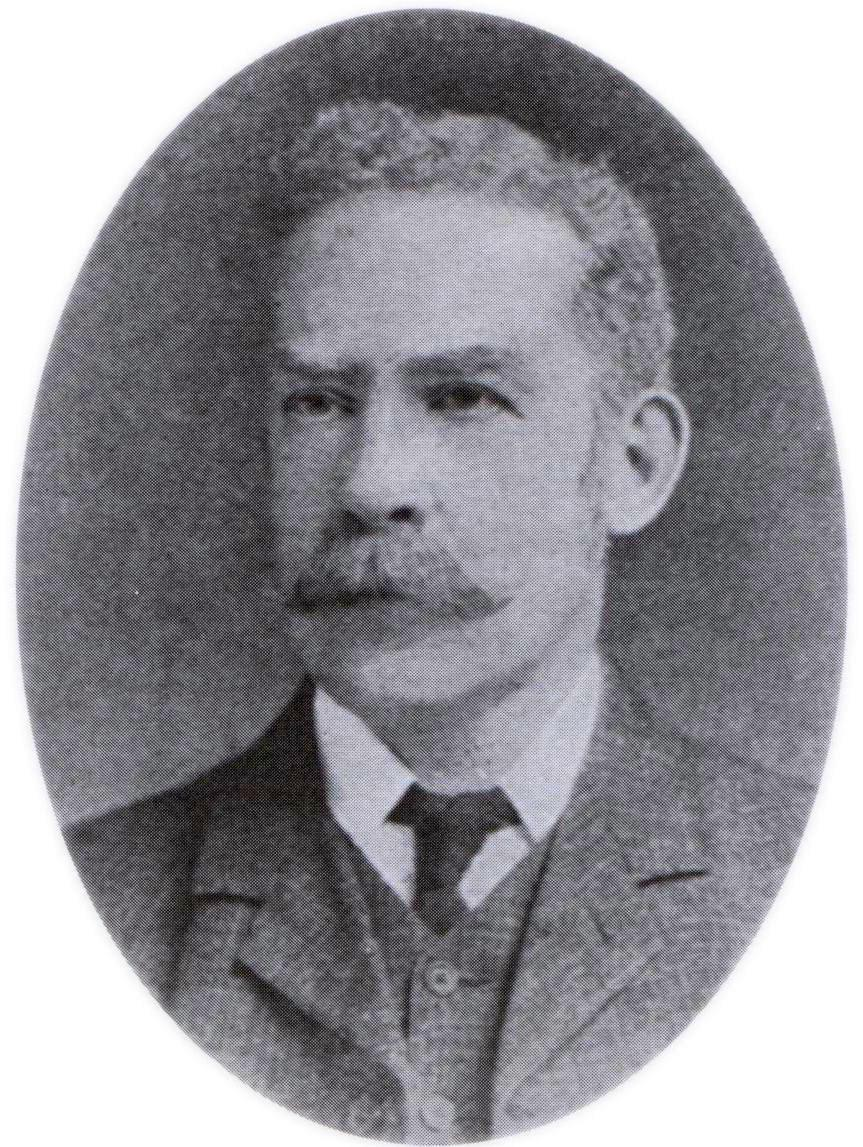

Personal information
- Date of birth: 30 March 1855
- Place of birth: Market Drayton, Shropshire
- Date of death: 13 January 1926 (age 70)

John Lewis (30 March 1855 – 13 January 1926) was an English football player, administrator and referee. He was born at Market Drayton, Shropshire, but lived most of his life in Lancashire and was primarily associated with Blackburn Rovers F.C. He was a leading referee from the earliest days of organised football, and when well into his 60s officiated in the gold medal match of the 1920 Olympic Games football tournament in Antwerp.

On 21 April 2008 it was announced that his grave at Blackburn Municipal Cemetery had been restored to its former glory, the costs having been met by Blackburn Rovers.

== Administrative work ==
Lewis was educated at Shrewsbury School where he began to play football. He was a strict teetotaller worked alongside Old Salopian Arthur Constantine in bringing about the formation of Blackburn Rovers F.C. in 1875, and actually played in the first side fielded by the club. He also contributed to the foundation of the Lancashire FA in 1878, and later became a vice-president of the Football Association and the Football League.

== Refereeing career ==
Lewis had established himself as a notable referee within the domestic game in England and earned the nickname 'Prince of Referees'. He was three times appointed the referee in the FA Cup Final (1895, 1897 and 1898).

He refereed the 1898 FA Cup Semi-finals between Southampton and Nottingham Forest; the first match ended in a 1–1 draw. The replay at Crystal Palace was played in a blizzard. After a scoreless first half (in which Joe Turner missed a penalty for Southampton), in the second half the Saints were on top when, with ten minutes left to play, referee Lewis stopped the match for a time and the players left the pitch. No sooner had the game restarted than the weather worsened but Lewis decided that the match should continue. Southampton's goalkeeper George Clawley had his eyes "choked with snow" and conceded two goals in the final minutes of the game. Despite Southampton's protests the F.A. decided that the result should stand – this was perhaps not surprising as Lewis was by then an eminent member of the F.A. board.

He was given charge of the 1908 Olympic final at White City, London between Great Britain and Denmark which passed by without incident.

== 1920 Olympic Final ==
Lewis had already refereed the semi-final between the host nation Belgium and the Netherlands on Thursday 31 August before being appointed for the final on Saturday 2 September 1920.

That Lewis was appointed match referee may be seen to be surprising in hindsight, given his age (then 65), but the Belgian national newspaper L'Action Nationale wrote an editorial on 4 September 1920 which read: "Mr. Lewis refereed the game magnificently on Thursday and yet Czechoslovakia are now disqualified".

As it transpired, the final was played in a poor spirit: with Belgium leading 2–0 in the 40th minute courtesy of a Robert Coppee penalty in the 6th minute and a Henri Larnoe goal in the 30th minute that was disputed but allowed to stand, Karel Pešek, the Czechoslovakia and Sparta Prague captain, pulled his team from the field in protest after Lewis had ejected Czech left-back Karel Steiner for assaulting Coppee. 15 minutes later, after Lewis had awarded the match and the gold medal to Belgium, the home crowd, led by Belgian soldiers, invaded the field.

The Czech delegation made the following statement in regard to their protest: "2. The majority of the decisions of the referee Mr. Lewis were distorted and it was obvious that it gave the public the wrong impression in regard to our game. Also both Belgian goals were the result of incorrect decisions of the referee and we seek a rigorous investigation on that point." They had also complained about the inclusion and performance of an English linesman, Charles Wreford-Brown, and the provocative influence of the troops lining the field.

The Czech protest was dismissed, and their team was disqualified. As a consequence, the tournament for the bronze medal was changed to one for the silver and bronze medals.

== See also ==
- Football at the 1920 Summer Olympics
