= Football at the 1920 Summer Olympics =

1920 Men's Olympic Football Tournament

Tournament details
- Host country: Belgium
- Dates: 28 August – 5 September 1920
- Teams: 15 (from 2 confederations)
- Venues: 4 (in 3 host cities)

Final positions
- Champions: Belgium (1st title)
- Runners-up: Spain
- Third place: Netherlands
- Fourth place: Italy

Tournament statistics
- Matches played: 17
- Goals scored: 70 (4.12 per match)
- Attendance: 150,600 (8,859 per match)
- Top scorer(s): (Sweden) Herbert Carlsson (7 goals)

Football was one of the 154 events at the 1920 Summer Olympics, held in Antwerp, Belgium. It was the fifth time association football was on the Olympic schedule. The tournament expanded to 15 countries, including a non-European nation (Egypt) for the first time.

As these were the first Olympics after World War I, the football teams representing the Central Powers (Germany, Austria, Hungary, Bulgaria and Turkey) were not invited. The English Football Association had also withdrawn from FIFA, together with the associations of the other UK Home Nations (Scotland, Ireland and Wales), after their demands that the federations of Germany, Austria and Hungary be expelled from that organisation were rejected: FIFA nevertheless accepted the entry of a team from Great Britain (representing the United Kingdom of Great Britain and Ireland), ruling that countries entering the Olympic Games in other sports should not be excluded from the football tournament. All of the selected players were from England and were amateurs, as the FA wanted the Olympics to remain amateur.

Britain had won the 1908 and 1912 gold medals, but were beaten by Norway 3–1 in the first round: the Norway national football team thus celebrated one of their iconic victories, alongside the elimination of Nazi Germany at the 1936 Berlin Olympics, the 1993 win over England in World Cup qualifying, and the 2–1 defeat of reigning world champions Brazil at the 1998 World Cup.

Hosts Belgium won the gold medal, with the final being abandoned in the 39th minute with Belgium leading 2–0 after Czechoslovakia – who participated in an international competition for the first time – walked off to protest the officiating: the Czechslovaks were subsequently ejected from the competition, and were not awarded the silver medal they would have been entitled had they gone on to lose the final.

As a result of Czechoslovakia's ejection and Belgium having received a first-round bye, the beaten quarter-finalists (Italy, Norway, Spain and Sweden) faced each other to determine who would play the Netherlands (who were beaten in their semifinal by Belgium), who were now assured of a medal.

The tournament ended with Belgium winning the gold medal, Spain the silver and the Netherlands the bronze.

== Venues ==
Antwerp	Football at the 1920 Summer Olympics is located in Belgium	Antwerp
Olympisch Stadion	Football at the 1920 Summer Olympics is located in Belgium	Stadion Broodstraat
Capacity: 35,000	Football at the 1920 Summer Olympics is located in Belgium	Capacity: Not known
Ghent	Football at the 1920 Summer Olympics is located in Belgium	Brussels
Jules Ottenstadion	Football at the 1920 Summer Olympics is located in Belgium	Stade Joseph Marien
Capacity: Not known	Football at the 1920 Summer Olympics is located in Belgium	Capacity: Not known

== Tournament ==
15 teams entered the competition, which was organized on a knockout basis, but Switzerland withdrew on the morning before the first round due to internal dissent: their opponent, France, was awarded a 2–0 victory.

As such, 12 teams entered the first round, with the winners joining France and hosts Belgium, who had a first-round bye, in the quarter-finals.

Norway defeated Great Britain in the first round, considered by Elo as one of the greatest football upsets of all time.

Czechoslovakia, participating in their first international tournament, made it to the final, beating Kingdom of SCS (who also played their first ever international match in the competition), Norway, and France, while Belgium, after their first-round bye, beat Spain and the Netherlands to qualify for the final.

The final was abandoned in the 39th minute and Belgium were awarded the gold medal after Czechoslovakia walked off to protest the officiating of the English referee, John Lewis, and his linesmen.

A form of the Bergvall System was used to determine the silver and bronze medals: firstly, the beaten quarter-finalists played off, and Spain emerged triumphant, overcoming Sweden 2–1 and Italy 2–0.

Under the original format, Spain would have played off against the teams beaten in the main tournament by gold medalists Belgium, with the winners of these matches playing off for silver and bronze medals. However, Czechoslovakia had been ejected from the competition, and Belgium had received a first-round bye: therefore, the semi-finals were scratched, and Spain advanced to the silver and bronze medal match against the Netherlands, who had been beaten by Belgium in their semi-final. Spain won the match 3–1.

=== Exhibition match ===
This match was not part of the tournament, but was organized after both teams were eliminated. Some sources erroneously refer to this as an eighth-place match or as part of the silver and bronze medal tournament.

3 September 1920
10:00

Egypt	4–2	(Kingdom of Yugoslavia) Kingdom of SCS
Abaza 43' (??); Allouba (??); Hegazi (??)	Report	Dubravčić (??); Ružić (??)

Olympic Stadium, Antwerp
Attendance: 500
Referee: Raphael van Praag (NED)

== Results ==
=== Original bracket ===
First round
Spain	1
Denmark	0
Sweden	9
Greece	0
Luxembourg	0
Netherlands	3
France	2
Switzerland	0
Italy	2
Egypt	1
Czechoslovakia	7
Kingdom of SCS	0
Great Britain	1
Norway	3

Quarter-finals
Belgium	3
Spain	1
Sweden	4
Netherlands (a.e.t.)	5
France	3
Italy	1
Czechoslovakia	4
Norway	0

Semi-finals
Belgium	3
Netherlands	0
France	1
Czechoslovakia	4

Final
Belgium	2
Czechoslovakia	0

==== First round ====
28 August 1920
10:00

Czechoslovakia	7–0	(Kingdom of Yugoslavia) Kingdom of SCS
Vaník 20', 46', 79'; Janda 34', 50', 75'; Sedláček 43'	Report

Stadion Broodstraat, Antwerp
Attendance: 600
Referee: Raphael van Praag (BEL)

28 August 1920
15:30

Spain	1–0	Denmark
Arabolaza 54'	Report

La Butte, Brussels
Attendance: 3,000
Referee: Willem Eymers (NED)

28 August 1920
10:00

Italy	2–1	Egypt
Baloncieri 25'; Brezzi 57'	Report	Osman 30'

Jules Ottenstadion, Ghent
Attendance: 2,000
Referee: Paul Putz (BEL)

28 August 1920
15:30

Norway	3–1	Great Britain
Gundersen 13', 51'; Wilhelms 63'	Report	Nicholas 25'

Olympic Stadium, Antwerp
Attendance: 5,000
Referee: Johannes Mutters (NED)

28 August 1920
17:30

Netherlands	3–0	Luxembourg
J. Bulder 30'; Groosjohan 47', 85'	Report

La Butte, Brussels
Attendance: 3,000
Referee: Georges Hubrecht (BEL)

28 August 1920

France	2–0 Awarded	Switzerland

28 August 1920
17:30

Sweden	9–0	Greece
Olsson 4', 79'; Karlsson 15', 20', 21', 51', 85'; Wicksell 25'; Dahl 31'	Report

Olympic Stadium, Antwerp
Attendance: 5,000
Referee: Charles Barette (BEL)

Bye: Belgium

==== Quarter-finals ====
29 August 1920
10:00

Netherlands	5–4 (a.e.t.)	Sweden
Groosjohan 10', 57'; J. Bulder 44', 88' (pen.); De Natris 115'	Report	Karlsson 16', 32'; Olsson 20'; Dahl 72'

Stadion Broodstraat, Antwerp
Attendance: 5,000
Referee: Josef Fanta (TCH)

29 August 1920
16:30

Czechoslovakia	4–0	Norway
Vaník 8'; Janda 17', 66', 77'	Report

La Butte, Brussels
Attendance: 4,000
Referee: Charles Barette (BEL)

29 August 1920
15:00

France	3–1	Italy
Boyer 10'; Nicolas 14'; Bard 54'	Report	Brezzi 33' (pen.)

Olympic Stadium, Antwerp
Attendance: 10,000
Referee: Henri Christophe (BEL)

29 August 1920
17:00

Belgium	3–1	Spain
Coppée 11', 52', 55'	Report	Arrate 62' (pen.)

Olympic Stadium, Antwerp
Attendance: 18,000
Referee: Johannes Mutters (NED)

==== Semi-finals ====
31 August 1920
15:35

Czechoslovakia	4–1	France
Mazal 18', 75', 87'; Steiner 70'	Report	Boyer 79'

Olympic Stadium, Antwerp
Attendance: 12,000
Referee: Johannes Mutters (NED)

31 August 1920
17:25

Belgium	3–0	Netherlands
Larnoe 46'; Van Hege 55'; Bragard 85'	Report

Olympic Stadium, Antwerp
Attendance: 22,000
Referee: John Lewis (GBR)

==== Gold medal match ====
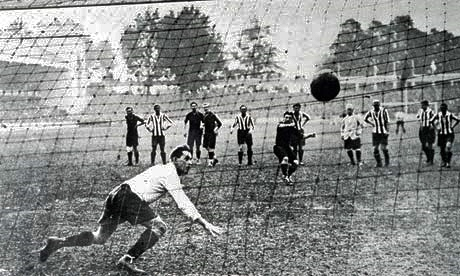
Belgian striker Robert Coppée opens the scoring of the final, with a penalty kick against goalkeeper Rudolf Klapka

The final was highly controversial, and is the only time as of 2024 that an international final has been abandoned: Belgium were awarded the gold medal after Czechoslovakia walked off the pitch in the 39th minute with Belgium leading 2–0 to protest the officiating after Czechoslovak left-back Karel Steiner was ejected for assaulting Belgian striker Robert Coppée.

The Czechoslovaks were also deeply dissatisfied with the performance of the 65-year-old English referee, John Lewis, as well as that of the English linesmen, Charles Wreford-Brown and Arthur Knight, who had allowed a contentious second Belgian goal by Henri Larnoe in the 30th minute.

Lewis, Wreford-Brown and Knight had officiated the Belgian semi-final victory over the Netherlands two days earlier, a match observed by the Czechoslovaks (it had taken place on the same day and in the same stadium as their own semi-final victory against France).

The Czechoslovaks immediately protested the result of the final, (Note: Their protests, translated from the original French, were as follows: 1. We were allocated an English linesman, which is in contradiction with the rules which state that each participating nation has the right to one of both linesman. This violation of the rules was prejudicial to us during the game, because the English linesman was not impartial and this is why we seek the cancellation of the match. Immediately after the game we brought this notice to the attention of M. Rodolphe Seeldrayers.; 2. The majority of the decisions of the referee Mr. Lewis were wrong and it was obvious that it gave the public the wrong impression about our game. Also both Belgian goals were the result of incorrect decisions of the referee and we seek a rigorous investigation on that point.; 3. During the match, Belgian soldiers were introduced to the crowd until they circled the pitch and because of their provocative presence our players were unable to play their normal game. As a result of the very regrettable incident at the end of the match when there was a pitch invasion led by the soldiers and our national flag was insulted we will not participate until we have received an apology from the (Belgian) soldiers.) but their protest was dismissed, and the Czechoslovak team was immediately ejected from the competition.

1920 Summer Olympics Football Final
2 September 1920
17:30

Belgium	2–0 Awarded	Czechoslovakia
Coppée 6' (pen.); Larnoe 30'	Report

Olympic Stadium, Antwerp
Attendance: 35,000
Referee: John Lewis (GBR)

=== Silver and bronze medal tournament ===
==== Repechage bracket ====
The original format was based on a form of the Bergvall System. After a knockout tournament between the four teams beaten in the quarter-finals, the winner of that tournament would play off with the teams beaten in the main tournament by the gold medalists (Belgium) in the semi-finals, with the winners of these matches playing off for silver and bronze medals.

However, beaten finalists Czechoslovakia had been ejected from the competition, and gold medalists Belgium had received a bye in the first round: therefore, the semi-finals were scratched, with Spain, the winner of the beaten quarter-finalists tournament, advancing to the silver and bronze medal match against the Netherlands (who had been beaten in the semifinals by Belgium).

First round
QF	Italy (a.e.t.)	2
QF	Norway	1
QF	Spain	2
QF	Sweden	1

Second round
QF	Italy	0
QF	Spain	2

Silver and bronze medal match
SF	Netherlands	1
QF	Spain	3

==== First round ====
31 August 1920
10:00

Italy	2–1 (Note: After 120 minutes expired with the score tied at 1–1, both captains and the referee agreed to play a second extra time of 2x15 minutes, meaning this match lasted 150 minutes.) (a.e.t.)	Norway
Sardi 46'; Badini 123'	Report	Andersen 41'

Stadion Broodstraat, Antwerp
Attendance: 500
Referee: Louis Fourgous (France)

1 September 1920
12:00

Spain	2–1	Sweden
Belauste 51'; Acedo 53'	Report	Dahl 28'

Stadion Broodstraat, Antwerp
Attendance: 1,500
Referee: Giovanni Mauro (Italy)

==== Second round ====
2 September 1920
12:00

Spain	2–0	Italy
Sesúmaga 43', 72'	Report

Olympic Stadium, Antwerp
Attendance: 10,000
Referee: Paul Putz (Belgium)

==== Silver and bronze medal match ====
5 September 1920
15:00

Spain	3–1	Netherlands
Sesúmaga 7', 35'; Pichichi 72'	Report	Groosjohan 68'

Olympic Stadium, Antwerp
Attendance: 14,000
Referee: Paul Putz (Belgium)

== Final ranking ==
Final positions:

Pos	Team	Pld	W	D	L	GF	GA	GD	Pts	Result
1st place, gold medalist(s)	Belgium	3	3	0	0	8	1	+7	6	
2nd place, silver medalist(s)	Spain	5	4	0	1	9	5	+4	8	
3rd place, bronze medalist(s)	Netherlands	4	2	0	2	9	10	−1	4	
4	Italy	4	2	0	2	5	7	−2	4	Eliminated in playoffs
5	Sweden	3	1	0	2	14	7	+7	2	Eliminated in playoffs
6	France	2	1	0	1	4	5	−1	2	Eliminated in playoffs
7	Norway	3	1	0	2	4	7	−3	2	Eliminated in playoffs
8	Egypt	1	0	0	1	1	2	−1	0	Eliminated in first round
9	Denmark	1	0	0	1	0	1	−1	0	Eliminated in first round
10	Great Britain	1	0	0	1	1	3	−2	0	Eliminated in first round
11	Luxembourg	1	0	0	1	0	3	−3	0	Eliminated in first round
12	(Kingdom of Yugoslavia) Kingdom of SCS	1	0	0	1	0	7	−7	0	Eliminated in first round
13	Greece	1	0	0	1	0	9	−9	0	Eliminated in first round
DSQ	Czechoslovakia	4	3	0	1	15	3	+12	6	Ejected from competition

Source: FIFA

== Medalists ==
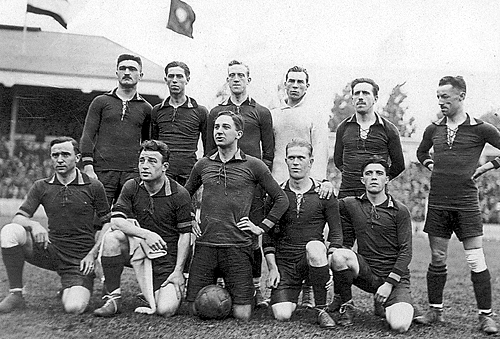
Hosts and tournament winners Belgium before the final

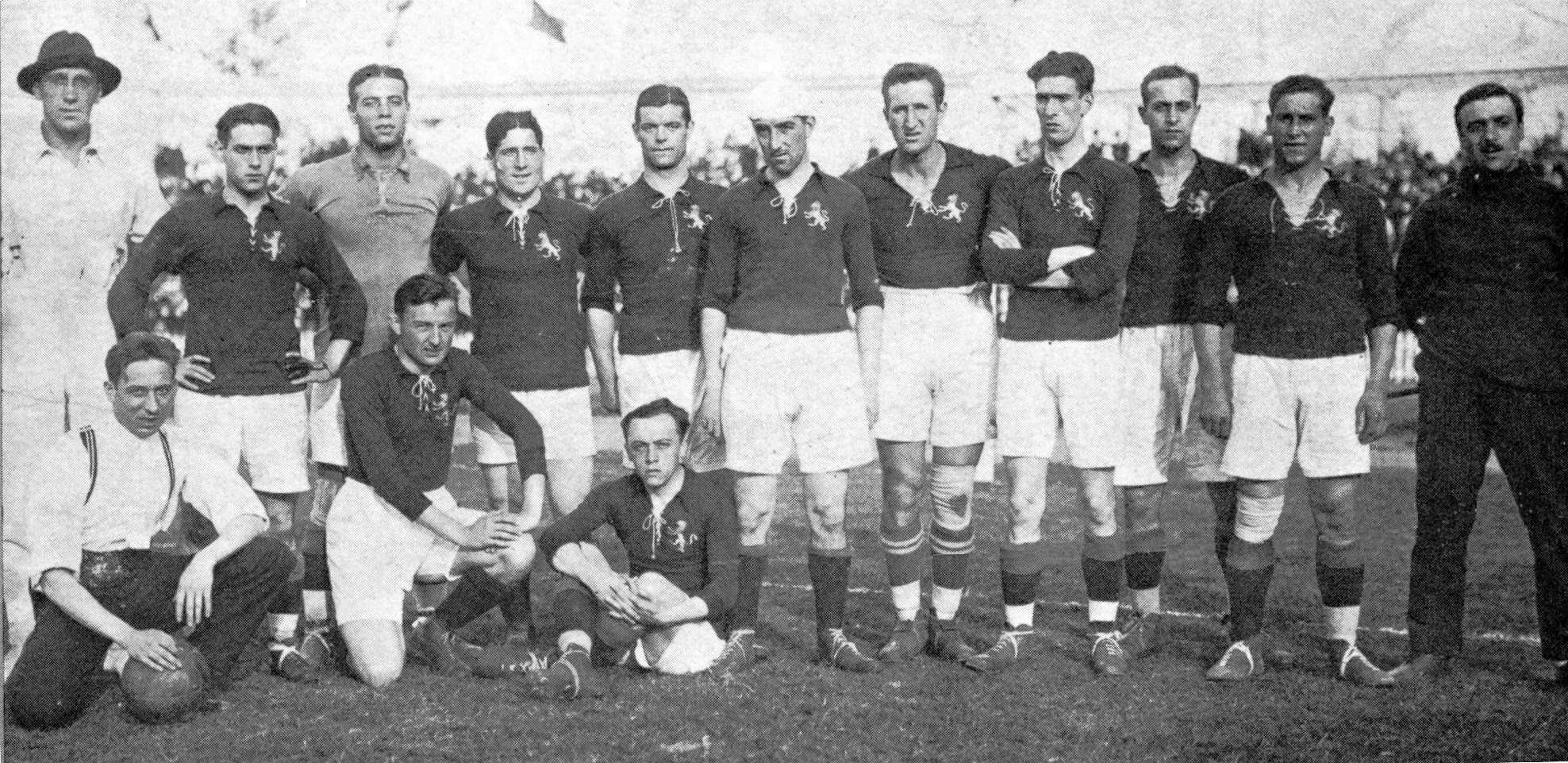
Team of Spain, silver medalist

Gold	Silver	Bronze
Belgium: Félix Balyu; Désiré Bastin; Mathieu Bragard; Robert Coppée; Jean De Bie; André Fierens; Emile Hanse; Georges Hebdin; Louis van Hege; Henri Larnoe; Joseph Musch; Fernand Nisot; Armand Swartenbroeks; Oscar Verbeeck; Coach: Raoul Daufresne	Spain: Patricio Arabolaza; Mariano Arrate; Juan Artola; José María Belauste; Sabino Bilbao; Ramón Eguiazábal; Agustín Eizaguirre; Ramón Gil; Domingo Acedo; Silverio Izaguirre; Pichichi; Luis Otero; Francisco Pagazaurtundúa; José Samitier; Agustín Sancho; Félix Sesúmaga; Pedro Vallana; Joaquín Vázquez; Ricardo Zamora; Coach: Francisco Bru	Netherlands: Arie Bieshaar; Leo Bosschart; Evert Jan Bulder; Jaap Bulder; Harry Dénis; Jan van Dort; Ber Groosjohan; Felix von Heijden; Frits Kuipers; Dick MacNeill; Jan de Natris; Oscar van Rappard; Henk Steeman; Ben Verweij; Coach: Fred Warburton

== Goalscorers ==
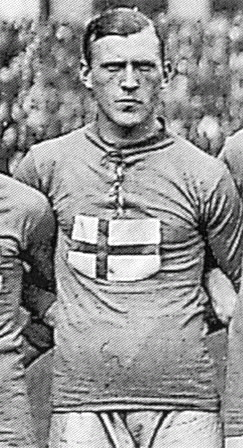
Topscorer Herbert Carlsson

7 goals

- Herbert Carlsson (Sweden)

6 goals

- (Czech Republic) Antonín Janda (Czechoslovakia)

5 goals

- Ber Groosjohan (Netherlands)

4 goals

- Robert Coppée (Belgium)
- (Czech Republic) Jan Vanik (Czechoslovakia)
- Félix Sesúmaga (Spain)

3 goals

- (Czech Republic) Otakar Mazal (Czechoslovakia)
- Jaap Bulder (Netherlands)
- Albin Dahl (Sweden)
- Albert Olsson (Sweden)

2 goals

- Henri Larnoe (Belgium)
- Sayed Abaza (Egypt)
- Jean Boyer (France)
- Guglielmo Brezzi (Italy)
- Einar Gundersen (Norway)

1 goal

- Mathieu Bragard (Belgium)
- Louis Van Hege (Belgium)
- (Czech Republic) Josef Sedláček (Czechoslovakia)
- (Czech Republic) Karel Steiner (Czechoslovakia)
- Hassan Allouba (Egypt)
- Hussein Hegazi (Egypt)
- Zaki Osman (Egypt)
- Henri Bard (France)
- Paul Nicolas (France)
- (United Kingdom) Fred Nicholas (Great Britain)
- Emilio Badini (Italy)
- Adolfo Baloncieri (Italy)
- Enrico Sardi (Italy)
- Jan de Natris (Netherlands)
- Arne Andersen (Norway)
- Einar Wilhelms (Norway)
- Domingo Acedo (Spain)
- Patricio Arabolaza (Spain)
- Mariano Arrate (Spain)
- José María Belauste (Spain)
- Pichichi (Spain)
- Ragnar Wicksell (Sweden)
- (Kingdom of Yugoslavia) Artur Dubravčić (Kingdom of SCS)
- (Kingdom of Yugoslavia) Jovan Ružić (Kingdom of SCS)
