= Olympisch Stadion =

Olympisch Stadion (Dutch, 'Olympic Stadium') may refer to:

- Olympisch Stadion (Antwerp)
- Olympic Stadium (Amsterdam)
