= Zaki Osman =

Zaki Osman may refer to:

- Zaki Osman (footballer, born 1898), Egyptian footballer
- Zaki Osman (footballer, born 1932), Egyptian footballer
