= Ben Verweij =

Dutch footballer

Personal information
- Full name: Bernard Willem Jan Verweij
- Date of birth: August 31, 1895
- Place of birth: Medan, Dutch East Indies
- Date of death: July 14, 1951 (aged 55)
- Place of death: Amsterdam, Netherlands

International career
Years	Team	Apps	(Gls)
1919–1924	Netherlands		
Medal record
Bronze medal – third place	1920 Antwerp	Football

Olympic medal record

Men's Football
Bronze medal – third place	1920 Antwerp	Team competition

Bernard ("Ben") Willem Jan Verweij (31 August 1895 in Medan, Sumatra – 14 July 1951 in Amsterdam) was a football (soccer) player from the Netherlands, who represented his home country at two consecutive Summer Olympics, starting in 1920. At his Olympic debut in Antwerp, Belgium he won the bronze medal with the Netherlands national football team, followed by a fourth place four years later in Paris, France.
