= Arie Bieshaar =

Dutch footballer (1899–1965)

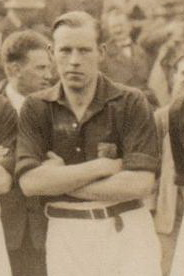
- Arie Bieshaar in 1923

Personal information
- Full name: Adrianus Gerardus Bieshaar
- Date of birth: 15 March 1899
- Place of birth: Amsterdam, Netherlands
- Date of death: 21 January 1965 (aged 65)
- Place of death: Haarlem, Netherlands
- Position: Midfielder

Youth career
- VRA

Senior career*
Years	Team	Apps	(Gls)
1917–1934	Haarlem	285	(119)

International career
1920–1923	Netherlands	4	(0)
Medal record
Men's football
Representing the Netherlands
Olympic Games
Bronze medal – third place	1920 Antwerp	Team competition
- * Club domestic league appearances and goals

Adrianus "Arie" Gerardus Bieshaar (15 March 1899 – 21 January 1965) was a football player from the Netherlands.

== Club career ==
Bieshaar played the majority of his career for Haarlem, scoring 119 goals in 285 matches.

== International career ==
He represented his native country at the 1920 Summer Olympics in Antwerp, Belgium. There he won the bronze medal with the Netherlands national football team. He earned 4 caps, scoring no goals, and played his final international match in 1923 against Germany.
