= Dick MacNeill =

Dutch footballer

Medal record

Men's Football

Representing Netherlands

Olympic Games
Bronze medal – third place	1920 Antwerp	Team competition

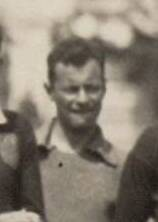
Dick MacNeill (1920)

Richard MacNeill (7 January 1898 in Pasuruan, Dutch East Indies – 3 June 1963 in Heemstede) was a football (soccer) goalkeeper from the Netherlands, who represented his home country at the 1920 Summer Olympics. There he won the bronze medal with the Netherlands national football team.

MacNeill was also known as Robert MacNeill.
