= Frits Kuipers =

Dutch footballer

Medal record

Men's Football

Representing Netherlands

Olympic Games
Bronze medal – third place	1920 Antwerp	Team competition

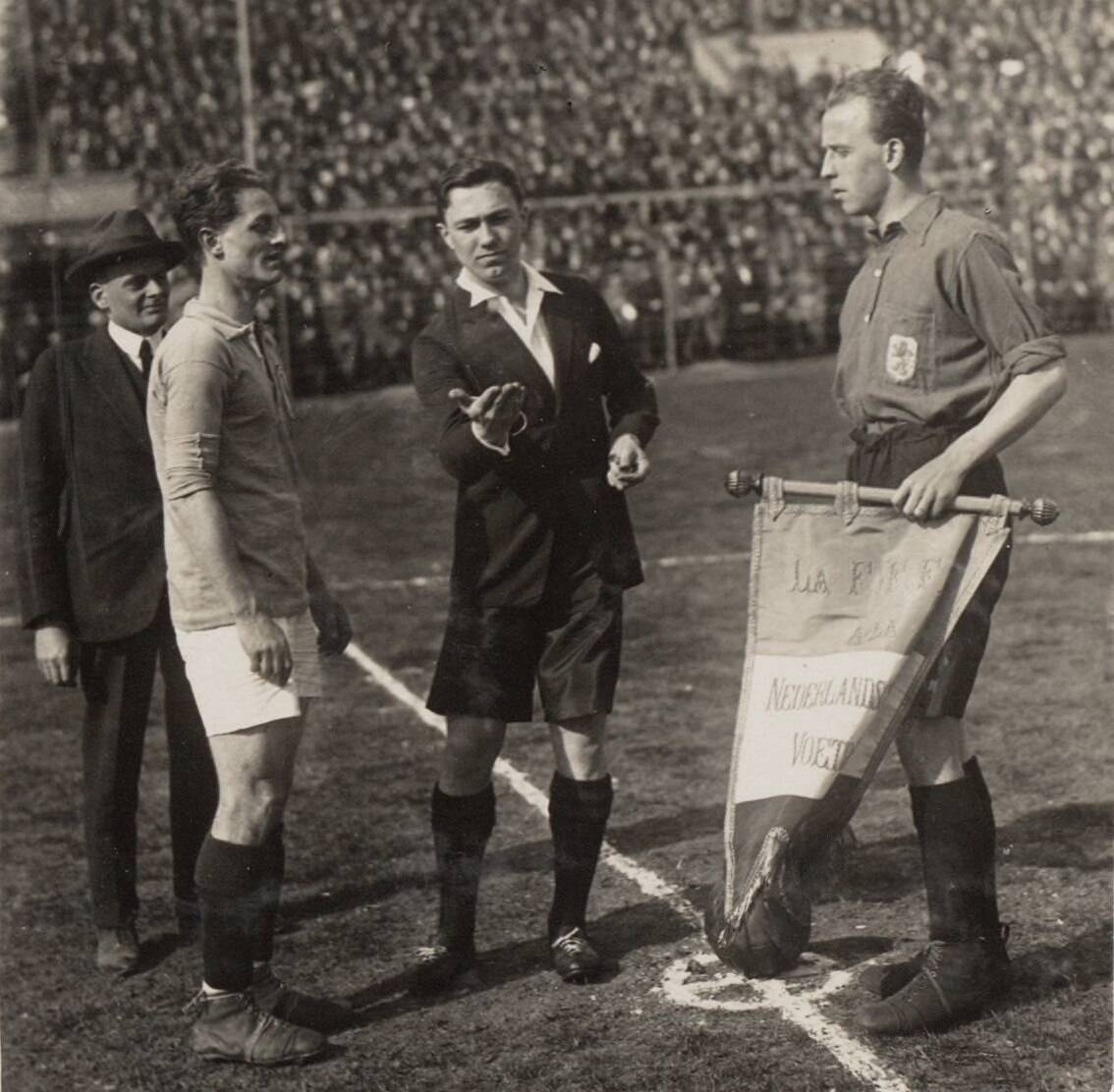
Kuipers (right, captain of the Dutch team in 1923)

Frederik "Frits" Carel Kuipers (11 July 1899 in Lent, Gelderland – 10 October 1943 in Heemstede) was a football (soccer) player from the Netherlands, who was included in the Netherlands national football team for the 1920 Summer Olympics, winning the bronze medal. In his final international match in 1923 he captained the Netherlands team. Kuipers played for Quick Nijmegen and Koninklijke HFC. He competed in rowing on national level and his profession was physician.
