= Silverio Izaguirre =

Spanish footballer

Medal record

Men's football

Representing Spain

Olympic Games
Silver medal – second place	1920 Antwerp	Team competition

Marcelino Silverio Izaguirre Sorzabalbere (also known as simply Silverio; 26 April 1898 (Note: Some sources say, he was born on 31 August 1897.) – 19 November 1935) was a Spanish football player who competed in the 1920 Summer Olympics. He was born in San Sebastián. He was a member of the Spanish team, which won the silver medal in the football tournament.

== Biography ==
Silverio played mainly for Real Sociedad, except for one season at Real Club Deportivo de Oviedo (the predecessor of the current Real Oviedo). With the San Sebastián team, he won two regional championships. He played 12 official matches and scored 2 goals.

He played for the Spain national football team. His only international match took place in Antwerp on September 2, 1920, during Spain's 2–0 victory over Italy in the Football at the 1920 Summer Olympics. During this match, Silverio, who replaced starting forward Patricio Arabolaza, was forced to replace goalkeeper Ricardo Zamora during the last quarter of an hour of the game, as Zamora had been sent off and substitutions were not allowed at that time . While playing as goalkeeper, Silverio does not concede any goals. The victory over Italy allowed the Spanish team to play in the Bronze medal playoff, which they won, earning a silver medal after Czechoslovakia withdrew from the final.

Silverio died in November 1935.
