= Henk Steeman =

Dutch footballer

Medal record

Men's football

Representing Netherlands

Olympic Games
Bronze medal – third place	1920 Antwerp	Team competition

Hermanus Hendrikus "Henk" Steeman (15 January 1894 in Rotterdam – 16 February 1979 in the Hague) was a footballer (soccer) from the Netherlands, who represented his home country at the 1920 Summer Olympics. There he won the bronze medal with the Netherlands national football team. A player of Sparta Rotterdam, Steeman obtained a total of 13 caps for the Netherlands, from 1919 to 1925.
