= Otakar Škvajn =

Czech footballer

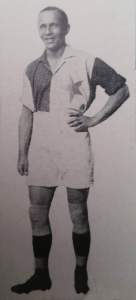
- Otakar Škvajn

Personal information
- Date of birth: 3 June 1894
- Place of birth: Kladno, Bohemia, Austria-Hungary
- Date of death: 12 September 1941 (aged 47)
- Place of death: Pardubice, Czechoslovakia

International career
Years	Team	Apps	(Gls)
1920–1921	Czechoslovakia	6	(3)

Otakar Škvajn (3 June 1894 – 12 September 1941) was a Czech footballer. He competed for Czechoslovakia in the men's tournament at the 1920 Summer Olympics.

On a club level, he played for SK Kladno, SK Židenice, Moravská Slavia Brno, SK Slavia Prague and AC Sparta Prague.

He was forced to end his active career at the age of 26 due to the knee injury. Afterwards, Škvajn began to work as a football manager, coaching i.a. SK Prostějov, SK Kladno, Pogoń Lwów and Wisła Kraków.
