= Karel Pešek =

Czech footballer and ice hockey player

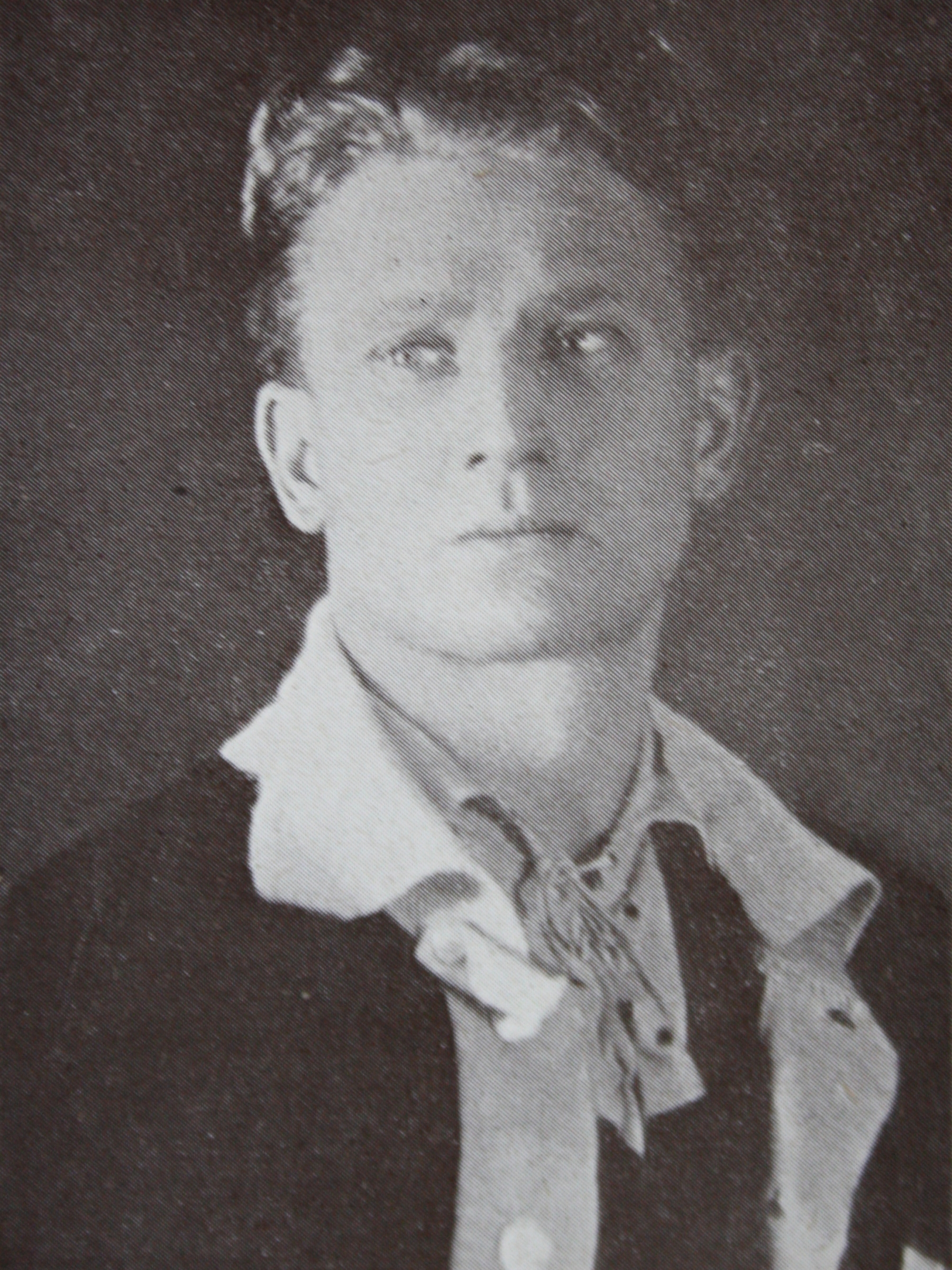

Personal information
- Date of birth: 20 September 1895
- Place of birth: Olomouc, Austria-Hungary
- Date of death: 30 September 1970 (aged 75)
- Place of death: Prague, Czechoslovakia
- Position: Midfielder

Youth career
- 1908–1912: SK Meteor Vinohrady

Senior career*
| Years | Team | Apps | (Gls) |
| 1913 | ČAFC Královské Vinohrady | | |
| 1913–1933 | Sparta Prague | | |
| 1933–1934 | SK Židenice | | |

International career
| 1920–1931 | Czechoslovakia | 44 | (1) |
- * Club domestic league appearances and goals

Olympic medal record

Men's Ice hockey
| Bronze medal – third place | 1920 Antwerp | Team competition |

Karel "Káďa" Pešek (20 September 1895 – 30 September 1970) was a Czech ice hockey and football player. He played as midfielder for Sparta Prague and the Czechoslovak football national team. He played from 1913 to 1933 (interrupted only by military service during World War I), scoring 149 goals in his club career. Pešek was voted by IFFHS (International Federation of Football History and Statistics) as the 81st greatest European footballer of the 20th century, and the third greatest Czechoslovak player of the 20th century behind Josef Bican and Josef Masopust.

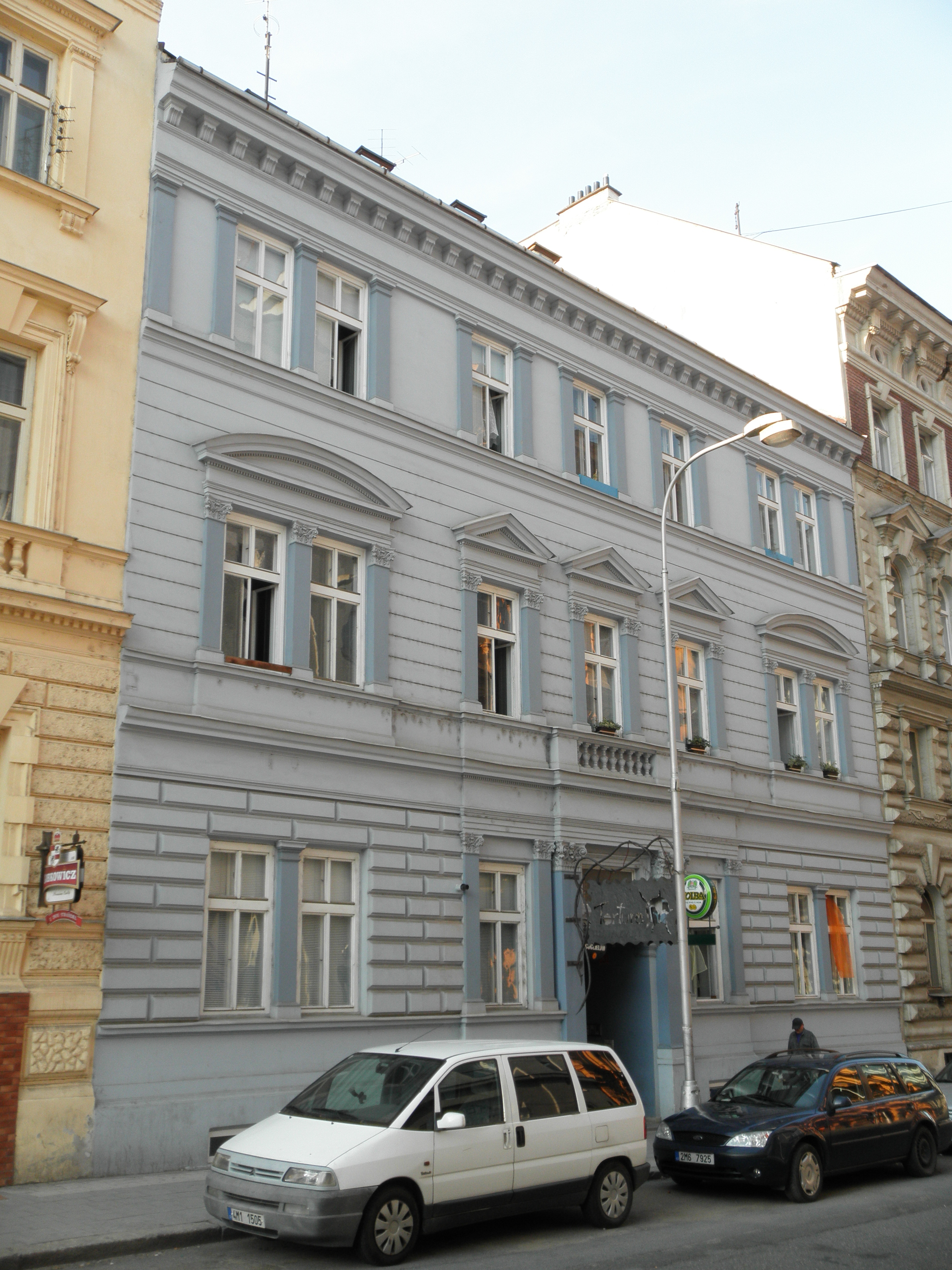
Birthplace of a Karel Pešek in Komenského street 9 in Olomouc

== Career ==
With Sparta Prague, Pešek won the Czechoslovak national title in 1919, 1922, 1926, 1927 and 1932, and also won the inaugural edition of the Mitropa Cup in 1927. Internationally, Pešek played 44 matches over a span of 11 years for the national football team, scoring one goal. He was a participant in the 1920 Olympic Games in Antwerp and 1924 Olympic Games in Paris. Of note, the Czech football team actually made the finals of the 1920 Olympic tournament (presumably guaranteeing them at least a silver medal), but were disqualified from the competition after walking out late in the first half to protest the officiating.

== Ice hockey ==
At the 1920 Olympic Games (before the existence of the dedicated Winter Olympics), Pešek also competed in ice hockey, winning the bronze medal with the Czechoslovak team. Had the Czech football team not disqualified themselves from the gold medal match in 1920, Pešek would have been the first athlete in history to medal in both a Summer and Winter Olympic sport (a feat achieved only six times since the first Olympic Games in 1896)

== Style of play ==
Pešek started his playing career as a left back, but changed to center half, a position he played for most of his career. A midsized footballer, he was not tall but particularly strong, he was an outstanding athlete (as evidenced by him playing two Olympic sports) and was known for his great physical endurance. Pešek was a complete technical footballer, a precise passer, and excellent in both defence and attack. He often increased the pace of his teams' attack and linked well with the forward line. According to Hungarian footballer Alfred Schaffer, "the advantage of his game is the huge calm in his head and legs. While another center half clings to you with a thud, Káda kicks in quite quietly and takes the ball from you".

== Life After Sports ==
Pešek retired completely from sports in 1934, working for the Czechoslovak Health Ministry until being fired in the early 1950s for not being a member of the Communist Party. He died of cardiac arrest, shortly after his 75th birthday.
