= Joseph Musch =

Belgian footballer

Olympic medal record

Men's Football
Gold medal – first place	1920 Antwerp	Team competition

Joseph B. "Prince" Musch (12 October 1893 – 25 September 1971) was a Belgian football (soccer) player who competed in the 1920 Summer Olympics. He was a member of the Belgian team, which won the gold medal in the football tournament. Joseph played for R.U. Saint-Gilloise and appeared in 258 matches, scoring 113 goals.
