= Stadion Broodstraat =

Football stadium in Antwerp, Belgium

- Interactive map of Stadion Broodstraat
- Location: Antwerp, Belgium
- Coordinates: 51°13′58″N 4°28′18″E
- Capacity: 5,350

Stadion Broodstraat was an Association football or soccer venue located in Antwerp, Belgium. The venue hosted the Royal Antwerp FC from 1908 to 1923. It served as one of the two main venues for the football tournament at the 1920 Summer Olympics, together with Antwerp's Olympisch Stadion.
