= André Fierens =

Belgian footballer

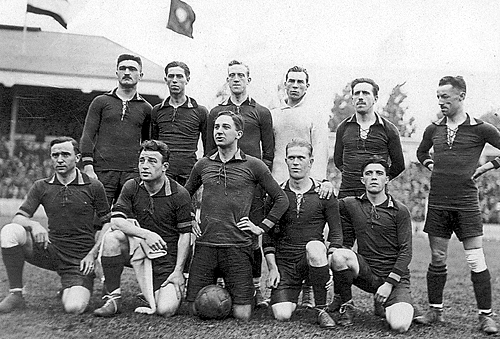
- Belgium national football team on 2 September 1920 before their match against Czechoslovakia Back row, left to right: Armand Swartenbroeks, André Fierens, Emile Hanse, Jean De Bie (goalkeeper), Joseph Musch, Oscar Verbeeck Front row, left to right: Louis Van Hege, Robert Coppée, Mathieu Bragard, Henri Larnoe, Désiré Bastin

Personal information
- Full name: Andréas J. Fierens
- Date of birth: 8 February 1898
- Place of birth: Antwerp, Belgium
- Date of death: 12 January 1971 (aged 72)

Senior career*
Years	Team	Apps	(Gls)
1919–	K. Beerschot V.A.C.	147	(15)
Total		147	(15)

International career
1920–1925	Belgium MNT	24	(0)

Managerial career
- K. Rupel Boom F.C.
- S.C. Eendracht Aalst
Medal record
Representing Belgium Olympic medal record Men's Football: Gold medal – first place / 1920 Antwerp / Team competition
Belgian First Division
Winner	1921–22 Belgian First Division	1921–22
Winner	1923–24 Belgian First Division	1923
Winner	1924–25 Belgian First Division	1924–25
Winner	1925–26 Belgian First Division	1925–26
- * Club domestic league appearances and goals

Andréas J. Fierens (8 February 1898 – 12 January 1971) was a Belgian football (soccer) player who competed in the 1920 Summer Olympics. He was a member of the Belgium team, which won the gold medal in the football tournament.
