= Eric Robertson (athlete) =

British marathoner

Personal information
- Nationality: British
- Born: 12 September 1892 St. John's, Newfoundland, Newfoundland Colony, British North America
- Died: 28 July 1975 (aged 82)
- Height: 168 cm (5 ft 6 in)

Sport
- Sport: Long-distance running
- Event: Marathon

Eric Mackenzie Robertson (12 September 1892 – 28 July 1975) was a Newfoundland marathoner, who competed at the 1920 Summer Olympics in Antwerp, Belgium for Great Britain. He was born in St. John's, Newfoundland and Labrador.

After the war, he settled in London. While working in a clothing store, some of his co-workers were members of the Polytechnic Harriers, and through them he developed his love of running. In 1920, he travelled to Antwerp to cheer on his teammates from the Harriers, who were members of the British team. However, the British team was short one person, and his teammates convinced their coach to let Robertson run in the marathon. His inexperience showed as he finished in last place, 35 minutes behind the second-to-last finisher.
