= Jan de Natris =

Dutch footballer

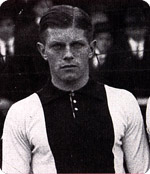

Medal record

Men's football

Representing the Netherlands

Olympic Games
Bronze medal – third place	1920 Antwerp	Team competition

Johannes Daniël de Natris (13 November 1895 – 16 September 1972) was a Dutch footballer who represented his home country at both the 1920 Summer Olympics in Antwerp, Belgium and the 1924 Summer Olympics in Paris, France.

== Career ==
In 1920, he won the bronze medal with the Netherlands national football team. De Natris obtained a total number of 23 caps for Holland in the 1920s, and played for Ajax Amsterdam, Vitesse Arnhem and De Spartaan.

== Career statistics ==
=== International ===
Netherlands national team
Year	Apps	Goals
1920	6	3
1921	4	0
1922	1	0
1924	8	2
1925	4	0
Total	23	5
