= Korfball at the 1920 Summer Olympics =

Korfball at the Games of the VII Olympiad
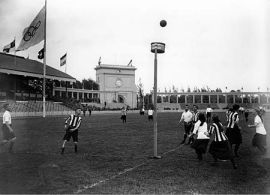
- Venue: Olympisch Stadion
- Dates: 22 August 1920
- Competitors: 27

Korfball was a demonstration sport at the 1920 Olympic Games in Antwerp. It took place at the Olympisch Stadion at 22 August 1920. It was the first appearance of korfball at the Olympic Games, and was contested by a team from South Holland and a team from Amsterdam.

== Organization ==
The idea of the exhibition match was originated by the Royal Dutch Korfball Association, which was then called the Netherlands Korfball Association (NKB). They first asked the organizing committee for the Games, in a letter written by F.W. Baron von Tuyll van Serooskerken, chairman of the Dutch Association for Physical Education. The proposal was rejected. Undeterred, another letter was written directly to the president of the organizing committee, IOC member Count Henri de Baillet-Latour. The committee accepted this proposal and left the organizing to a board consisting of N. Broekhuijsen, K.J. Heijboer and S.A. Wilson.

The cost of organizing the game was estimated at 1,400 Dutch guilders. However, mere months before the game was set to be played, only ƒ411 had been raised, and it appeared that the game may have to be canceled. A 'Korfball Day' was organized for April 18, 1920. ƒ687.15 were raised on this day, and in the end, ƒ1377.55 was raised, close enough to the goal for the game to go ahead.

== The Game ==
2 August 1920

Amsterdam	0 – 2	South Holland
	Report

Olympisch Stadion, Antwerp

The game was originally scheduled for August 1, but was later rescheduled for August 22.

The exhibition was held during the marathon, which was held in the Olympisch Stadion. The players got to the stadium a little late because their carriage driver brought them to a fairgrounds (a place that permanently hosts fairs) called 'The Olympic Games' rather than the actual Olympic Games. Still, the game started soon after the marathon got underway, and lasted until around 3:00, when the marathon was reaching its end, so as not to distract from the main event. The conditions were rainy and cold; this made the field slippery and ruled out a fast game, and jumping shots were impossible. The South Holland team won the game 2–0. After the second goal was scored, Amsterdam began to treat the game almost as a competitive match, though the point of the match was to exhibit the game of Korfball, not to win. In any event, the game was received positively, and the Belgian ambassador, Jonkheer van Vredenburgh, personally told the players after the match that he had enjoyed the game.

== Teams ==
Gender	Amsterdam	South Holland
Men	H. W. Vliegen	F. A. van Zimmeren
Men	N. Ouwehand	A. Ouwerkerk
Men	J. Brinck	N. Ragut
Men	L. Brinck	G. de Mey
Men	J. de Nie	K. Nieuwenhuizen
Men	G. Sieverts	H. van der Reyden
Women	F. Jansen	J. Schilthuizen
Women	A. van Beek	T. Buy
Women	E. Teunisse	J. Christiansen
Women	W. Stiens	N. van Noort
Women	T. Donker	S. Ballego
Women	M. Gregorius	F. Dekker
Reserves	L. van Koesveld (man)	H. J. Popp (man)
Reserves	T. Abeling (woman)	
