= Oscar Verbeeck =

Belgian footballer (1891–1971)

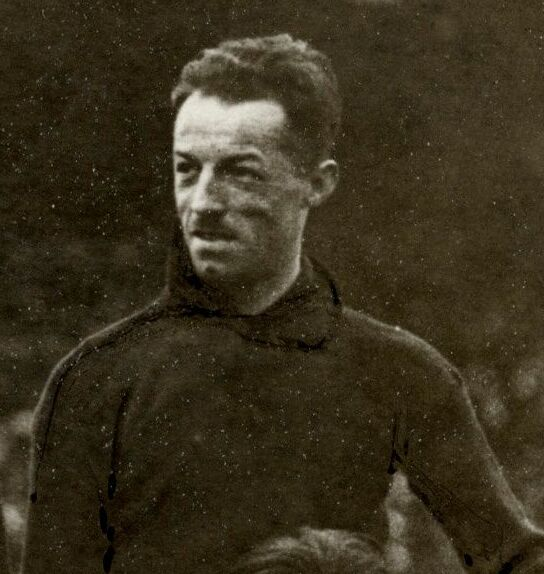

Personal information
- Date of birth: 6 June 1891
- Place of birth: Saint-Josse-ten-Noode, Belgium
- Date of death: 13 August 1971 (aged 80)
- Place of death: Brussels, Belgium
- Position: Defender

Senior career*
Years	Team	Apps	(Gls)
1908-1912	FC Brugeois		
1912-1926	Union SG		

International career
1914-1924	Belgium	27	(0)
Medal record
Olympic Games
Gold medal – first place	Antwerp 1920	Team
- * Club domestic league appearances and goals

Oscar Verbeeck (6 June 1891 – 13 August 1971) was a Belgian football player who played in the early part of the 20th century. His greatest success came in 1920 when he played a part in the Belgium team that won the gold medal in the football tournament of that year's Summer Olympics in Antwerp.

== Career ==
Born in Saint-Josse-ten-Noode, Belgium on 6 June 1891, Verbeeck began playing football for FC Brugeois in the Belgian First Division in 1908, playing four seasons with the club before moving to Union SG in 1912, who he would continue to play for until his retirement in 1926, albeit interrupted by World War I. With Union SG, he won two Belgian Cups in 1913 and 1914, as well as two league titles in 1912-13 and 1922-23.

Verbeeck earned 27 caps for the Belgium national team between 1914 and 1924. This total included four appearances in the Olympic Games: three appearances in Belgium's home gold medal win at the 1920 Summer Olympics in Antwerp, and one appearance at the 1924 Summer Olympics in Paris as the Belgium side lost their first match of the tournament 8-1 to Sweden.

Verbeeck's younger brother Théo was also an important name in Belgium football, as one of the first chairmen of RSC Anderlecht.

== Honours ==
Union SG

- Belgian First Division: 1912–13, 1922–23
- Belgian Cup: 1913, 1914

Belgium

- Olympic Gold Medal: 1920
