= Rudolf Klapka =

Czech footballer

Personal information
- Date of birth: 24 February 1895
- Place of birth: Žižkov, Austria-Hungary
- Date of death: 11 September 1951 (aged 56)
- Position: Goalkeeper

Senior career*
Years	Team	Apps	(Gls)
1918–1922	FK Viktoria Žižkov		

International career
1920	Czechoslovakia	4	(0)
- * Club domestic league appearances and goals

Rudolf Klapka (24 February 1895 – 11 September 1951) was a Czech footballer, who represented Czechoslovakia at the 1920 Summer Olympics.

Klapka played in the goalkeeper position for FK Viktoria Žižkov when he was selected for the first Czechoslovak team who would represent the country at the Summer Olympics in Antwerp, the country's first ever match was against Yugoslavia which they won 7–0, the next day they played Norway and Klapka again did not concede as they won 4–0, Klapka conceded his first goal in the semi-final match against France which they won 4–1. In the final against the hosts Belgium, Klapka conceded two goals in the first 30 minutes and then after 40 minutes Klapka and his team walked off in protest due to poor refereeing after a defender was sent-off, so the team were disqualified and did not receive a medal.
