= Karel Steiner =

Czechoslovak footballer (1895–1934)

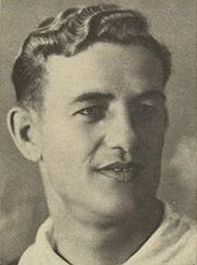

Personal information
- Date of birth: 26 January 1895
- Place of birth: Prague, Austria-Hungary
- Date of death: 29 April 1934 (aged 39)

International career
Years	Team	Apps	(Gls)
1920–1930	Czechoslovakia	14	(3)

Karel Steiner (26 January 1895 – 29 April 1934) was a Czechoslovak footballer. He competed in the men's tournament at the 1920 Summer Olympics. On a club level, he played for FK Viktoria Žižkov and AC Sparta Prague.
