= Enrico Sardi =

Italian footballer (1891–1969)

Personal information
- Date of birth: 1 April 1891
- Place of birth: Genoa, Italy
- Date of death: 4 July 1969 (aged 78)
- Place of death: Taranto, Italy
- Position: Forward

Senior career*
Years	Team	Apps	(Gls)
1908–1913	Andrea Doria	61	(36)
1913–1924	Genoa	105	(81)
1924–1925	Novese	?	(?)
1925–1927	Savona	8	(6)
1930–1931	Derthona	1	(0)

International career
1912–1920	Italy	7	(4)

Managerial career
- 1928–1929: Rapallo Ruentes
- 1931–1932: Taranto
- * Club domestic league appearances and goals

Enrico Sardi (Italian pronunciation: [enˈriːko ˈsardi]; 1 April 1891 – 4 July 1969) was an Italian footballer who played as a forward.

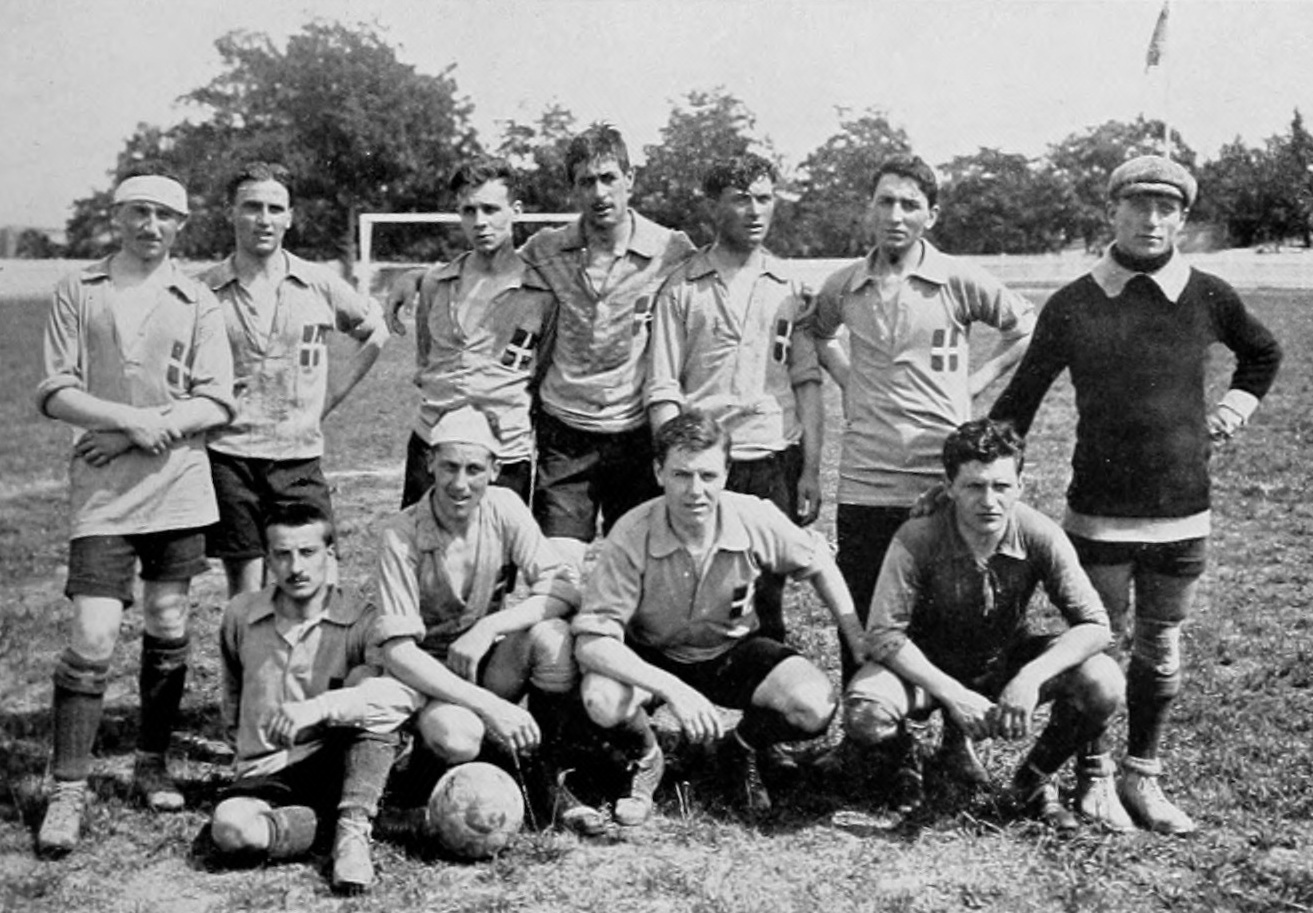
Italy squad at the 1912 Summer Olympics

He competed at the 1912 Summer Olympics and the 1920 Summer Olympics with Italy.
