= Ber Groosjohan =

Dutch footballer

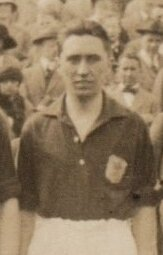

Personal information
- Full name: Bernardus Groosjohan
- Date of birth: 16 June 1897
- Place of birth: Rotterdam, Netherlands
- Date of death: 5 August 1971 (aged 74)
- Place of death: Rotterdam, Netherlands
- Position: Striker

Senior career*
Years	Team	Apps	(Gls)
1913–1915	Sparta		
1915–1925	VOC Rotterdam		

International career
1920–1924	Netherlands	14	(5)
- * Club domestic league appearances and goals

Olympic medal record

Men's football

Representing the Netherlands
Bronze medal – third place	1920 Antwerp	Team competition

Bernardus ("Ber") Groosjohan (16 June 1897 in Rotterdam – 5 August 1971 in Rotterdam) was a football (soccer) player from the Netherlands, who represented his native country at the 1920 Summer Olympics in Antwerp and the 1924 Summer Olympics in Paris. In Antwerp Groosjohan won the bronze medal with the Netherlands national football team. He was capped 14 times in total by his country.

During his club career, Groosjohan was the captain of Rotterdam outfit VOC.
