= Josef Fanta (referee) =

Czech football manager and referee (1889–1960)

Personal information
- Date of birth: 29 December 1889
- Place of birth: Karlín, Czechoslovakia
- Date of death: 19 October 1960 (aged 70)

Senior career*
Years	Team	Apps	(Gls)
1919–1920	Úředníci Karlín		

Managerial career
- 1920: Czechoslovakia
- 1922–1923: Czechoslovakia
- 1930–1932: Czechoslovakia
Refereeing career
Domestic
Years	League	Role
International
Years	League	Role
1920	FIFA listed	Referee
- * Club domestic league appearances and goals

Josef Fanta (29 December 1889 – 19 October 1960) was a Czech football manager, official and referee. He oversaw the Czechoslovakia national team on three occasions between 1920 and 1932. He officiated one match at the 1920 Olympic Games in Antwerp.

== Sporting career ==
=== Refereeing and managerial career ===
Born in Karlín on 29 December 1889, Fanta was a member of the Czechoslovak selection committee that participated at the 1920 Olympic Games in Antwerp, where he worked not only as a referee, officiating one quarter-final between the Netherlands and Sweden on 29 August, which ended in a 5–4 victory for the Dutch, but also as Czechoslovakia's coach, leading his side to the gold medal match, which ended in a controversial 2–0 loss to the hosts Belgium, but he did not receive a silver medal because they were disqualified following their withdrawal from the tournament. (Note: Some sources wrongly claim that the coach of Czechoslovakia was the Scotsman Johnny Madden, who had overseen the Czech team at the 1919 Interallied Games in Paris; in reality, however, he had no official function at the 1920 Olympics, although he did attend them in a private capacity.) In his managerial debut, Czechoslovakia claimed its biggest-ever win, a 7–0 trashing of Yugoslavia.

Fanta took over the Czechoslovakia national team on a further two occasions, between June 1922 and October 1923, in which he oversaw 7 matches, and again in the early 1930s, in which he oversaw 22 matches for a total of 33 at the helm of Czechoslovakia, winning 18, drawing 6, and losing 9.

=== Chairmanship ===
In 1921, Fanta was elected chairman of the Central Bohemian County, an organization that was made up of the biggest Prague clubs, and whose championship was the de facto highest competition in Czechoslovakia. A few years later, in 1926–27, he also became the chairman of the Czechoslovak Football Association, earning the nickname "Iron Robe" due to his very authoritative style. His preference for the clubs in Prague and the surrounding area led to dissatisfaction of the clubs from other regions, whose representatives managed to force Fanta's dismissal at the general meeting in 1936.

== Death ==
Fanta died on 19 October 1960, at the age of 70.
