= Hassan Allouba =

Egyptian footballer (born 1959)

Personal information
- Full name: Hassan Ali Allouba
- Place of birth: Asyut, Egypt
- Date of death: 3 January 1959

Senior career*
Years	Team	Apps	(Gls)
- Tersana SC

International career
1920	Egypt		
- * Club domestic league appearances and goals

Hassan Ali Allouba (died 3 January 1959) was an Egyptian footballer. He competed in the men's tournament at the 1920 Summer Olympics.
