= Robert Coppée =

Belgian footballer (1895–1970)

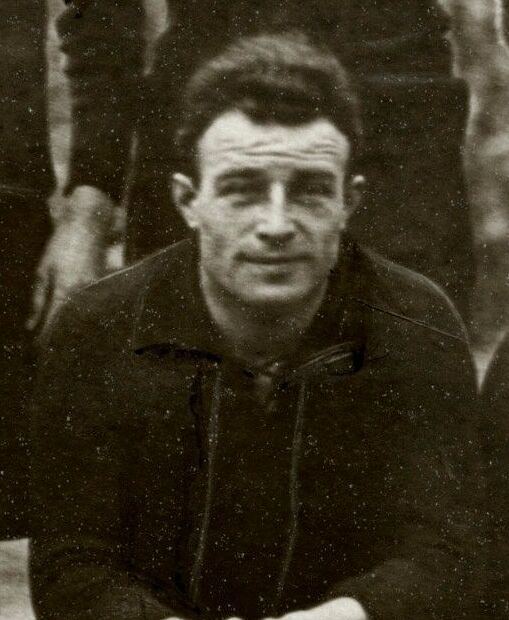
- Coppée in 1922

Personal information
- Full name: Robert Victor Joseph Coppée
- Date of birth: 23 April 1895
- Place of birth: Haine-Saint-Pierre, Belgium
- Date of death: 1 January 1970 (aged 74)
- Position: Forward

International career
Years	Team	Apps	(Gls)
1919–1924	Belgium	15	(9)
Medal record
Men's football
Representing Belgium
Olympic Games
Gold medal – first place	1920 Antwerp	Team

Robert Victor Joseph Coppée (23 April 1895 – 1970) was a Belgian footballer. Playing as a forward, he was a member of the Belgium national team. He represented his country at the Olympics in 1920 and 1924, winning the gold medal for football in the former tournament and scoring four times in three matches, including a hat-trick against Spain.

== Career statistics ==
=== International ===
Appearances and goals by national team and year
National team	Year	Apps	Goals
Belgium	1919	1	0
Belgium	1920	5	6
Belgium	1921	3	0
Belgium	1922	2	1
Belgium	1923	1	1
Belgium	1924	3	1
Total		15	9

== Honours ==
Belgium

- Summer Olympics gold medal: 1920
