= Zaki Osman (footballer, born 1898) =

Egyptian footballer (1898–1985)

Personal information
- Date of birth: 1898
- Date of death: 28 September 1985 (aged 86–87)

Senior career*
| Years | Team | Apps | (Gls) |
- Al Ahly

International career
| 1920 | Egypt | 2 | (1) |
- * Club domestic league appearances and goals

Zaki Osman (1898 – 28 September 1985) was an Egyptian footballer. He competed in the men's tournament at the 1920 Summer Olympics.
