= Jan Vaník =

Czech footballer

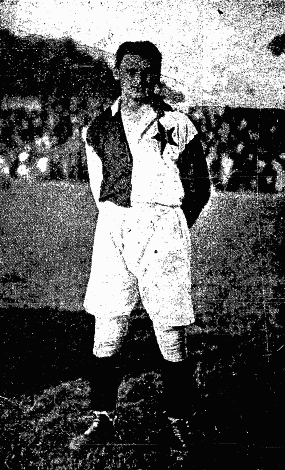
- Jan Vaník in 1922

Personal information
- Date of birth: 7 May 1891
- Place of birth: Prague, Austria-Hungary
- Date of death: 14 June 1950 (aged 59)
- Position: Forward

Youth career
- 1907–1908: SK Letná
- 1908–1910: SK Bubeneč

Senior career*
Years	Team	Apps	(Gls)
1910–1916	Sparta Prague		
1916–1926	Slavia Prague		

International career
1917	Austria	2	(0)
1920–1925	Czechoslovakia	12	(10)
- * Club domestic league appearances and goals

Jan Vaník (7 May 1891 – 12 June 1950) was a footballer who appeared for both the Austria and Czechoslovakia national teams. He competed in the men's tournament at the 1920 Summer Olympics. On a club level, he played for AC Sparta Prague and SK Slavia Prague, becoming the top goalscorer of the Czechoslovak First League in the 1925 season.

== Club career ==
Jan Vaník was very interested in the education of young football players and already at Sparta Prague, he took care of the junior side through his own initiative. Later, when he had retired, he helped lead courses for youth leaders. J. Šoltys, J. Čapek, A. Šimperský and J. Čtyřoký, among others, owed their growth to his activities. Also, he helped develop Frantisek Planicka. In 1918 Jan scored a total of 28 goals including friendlies. In 1920, Jan scored a total of 54 goals including friendlies. In 1921, Jan scored a total of 36 goals including friendlies.

== Career statistics ==
Appearances and goals by club, season, and competition. Official and unofficial games are included in this table.
Club	Season	Czech League		Bohemian Championship		Cup		Friendlies		Total	
Club	Season	Apps	Goals	Apps	Goals	Apps	Goals	Apps	Goals	Apps	Goals
Sparta Prague	1910	0	0	0	0	0	0	0	0	0	0
Sparta Prague	1911	0	0	0	0	0	0	0	47	0	47
Sparta Prague	1912	0	0	0	0	0	0	52	73	52	73
Sparta Prague	1913	0	0	0	0	0	0	0	92	0	92
Sparta Prague	1914	0	0	0	0	1	0	42	84	43	84
Sparta Prague	1915	3+	7+	0	0	0	0	25	54	28	64
Sparta Prague	1916	0	0	0	0	0	0	35	92	35	92
Slavia Prague	1917	3+	6+	1+	1+	0	0	17+	29+	21+	36+
Slavia Prague	1918	6+	16+	0	0	1+	2+	8+	25+	33+	44+
Slavia Prague	1919	6+	9+	0	0	0	0	17+	27+	23+	36+
Slavia Prague	1920	3+	4+	0	0	0	0	2+	50	5+	54
Slavia Prague	1921	0	0	0	0	0	0	0	36	0	36
Slavia Prague	1922	0	13	0	0	3+	1+	20+	22+	23+	36+
Slavia Prague	1923	0	0	0	0	2+	3+	19+	27+	21+	30+
Slavia Prague	1924	0	0	0	0	0	0	0	0	0	0
Slavia Prague	1925	8	13	3	6	0	0	3+	9+	14+	28+
Slavia Prague	1926	0	0	0	0	0	0	0	0	0	0
Slavia Prague	Total	29+	68+	4+	7+	7+	6+	240+	646+	280+	727+
