= Mathieu Bragard =

Belgian footballer (1895–1952)

Olympic medal record

Men's Football
Gold medal – first place	1920 Antwerp	Team competition

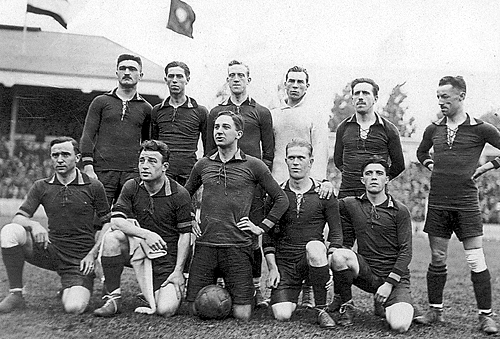

Mathieu Nicolas Bragard (10 March 1895 – 19 July 1952) was a Belgian football player who competed in the 1920 Summer Olympics. He was a member of the Belgian team, which won the gold medal in the football tournament.
