= Josef Sedláček =

Czech footballer

Personal information
- Date of birth: 15 December 1893
- Place of birth: Vienna, Austria-Hungary
- Date of death: 15 January 1985 (aged 91)

International career
Years	Team	Apps	(Gls)
1917	Austria	1	(1)
1920–1926	Czechoslovakia	13	(6)

Josef Sedláček (15 December 1893 – 15 January 1985) was a footballer who appeared for both the Austria and Czechoslovakia national teams. He competed at the 1920 Summer Olympics and the 1924 Summer Olympics. On a club level, he played for AC Sparta Prague.
