= Antonín Janda =

Czech footballer

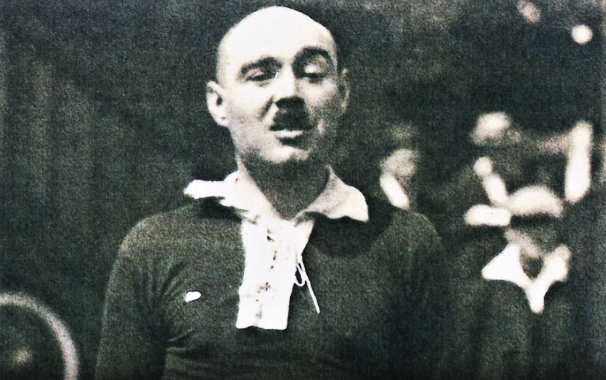
- Antonín Janda c. 1920s

Personal information
- Full name: Antonín Janda-Očko
- Date of birth: 21 September 1892
- Place of birth: Prague, Austria-Hungary
- Date of death: 21 January 1960 (aged 67)
- Position: Forward

Senior career*
Years	Team	Apps	(Gls)
1908-1916	Praha VII	100+	(100+)
1916-1924	AC Sparta Prague	330	(284)

International career
1920–1923	Czechoslovakia	10	(12)
- * Club domestic league appearances and goals

Antonín Janda-Očko (21 September 1892 – 21 January 1960) was an international footballer who played for Czechoslovakia and Sparta Prague as a forward.

== International career ==
Janda played 10 times for his home country, and in his participation with the Czechoslovak Olympic team at the 1920 Summer Olympics football tournament he was notable for having scored two hat-tricks and appearing in the final. However, he did not win a medal; after the dismissal of his team-mate Karel Steiner in that final against Belgium, Janda and the other discontented Czechoslovaks left the pitch in the 40th minute, ultimately causing the Czechoslovaks to get disqualified.

== See also ==
- List of footballers who achieved hat-trick records
