= Artur Dubravčić =

Croatian footballer

Personal information
- Date of birth: 15 September 1894
- Place of birth: Vrbovsko, Kingdom of Croatia-Slavonia, Austria-Hungary
- Date of death: 13 March 1969 (aged 74)
- Place of death: Zagreb, SR Croatia, SFR Yugoslavia
- Position: Midfielder

Senior career*
Years	Team	Apps	(Gls)
- Olimpija Karlovac
1920-1925	Concordia Zagreb		

International career
1920–1924	Kingdom of SCS	9	(1)
- * Club domestic league appearances and goals

Artur Dubravčić (15 September 1894 – 13 March 1969) was a Croatian-Yugoslavian footballer.

== Club career ==
When Dubravčić was still in high school in Karlovac, he was one of the founders and first players of the ŠK Olimpija Karlovac football club, which was established in 1908. During World War I he moved to Zagreb and joined local side Concordia, where he spent most of his professional career.

== International career ==
Dubravčić made history by being the first captain of Yugoslavia national football team in the team's inaugural match, a 7–0 defeat versus Czechoslovakia on 28 August 1920, at the 1920 Summer Olympics, and he also scored their first ever goal (against Egypt, five days later). He went on to appear and captain the team nine times in Yugoslavia's first 10 matches in the period between 1920 and 1924.

== Post-playing career ==
After retiring from football he worked as a football referee, sports journalist for Sportske novosti and correspondent for Politika, and a football official. He had died suddenly in 1969, just days before he was supposed to be given a life achievement award as part of Football Association of Yugoslavia's 50th anniversary celebration.
