= Henri Larnoe =

Belgian footballer

Olympic medal record

Men's Football
Gold medal – first place	1920 Antwerp	Team competition

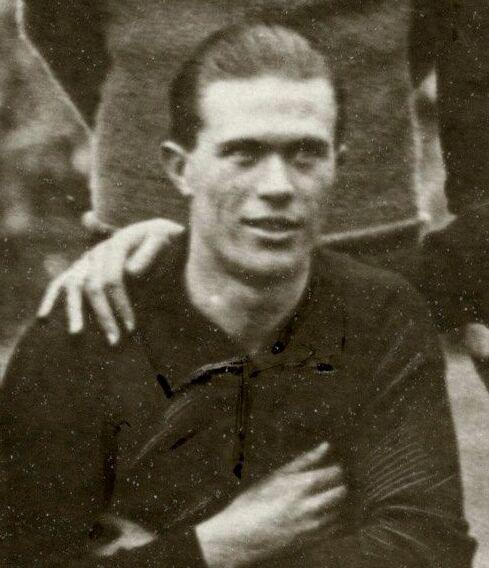
Henri Larnoe (1922)

Alfons Henri "Rik" Larnoe (18 May 1897 – 24 February 1978) was a Belgian football player who competed in the 1920 Summer Olympics. He was a member of the Belgian national team, which won the gold medal in the football tournament.
