= Olympisch Stadion (Antwerp) =

Stadium at Antwerp, Belgium

Coordinates: 51°11′06″N 4°22′56″E

- Het Kiel
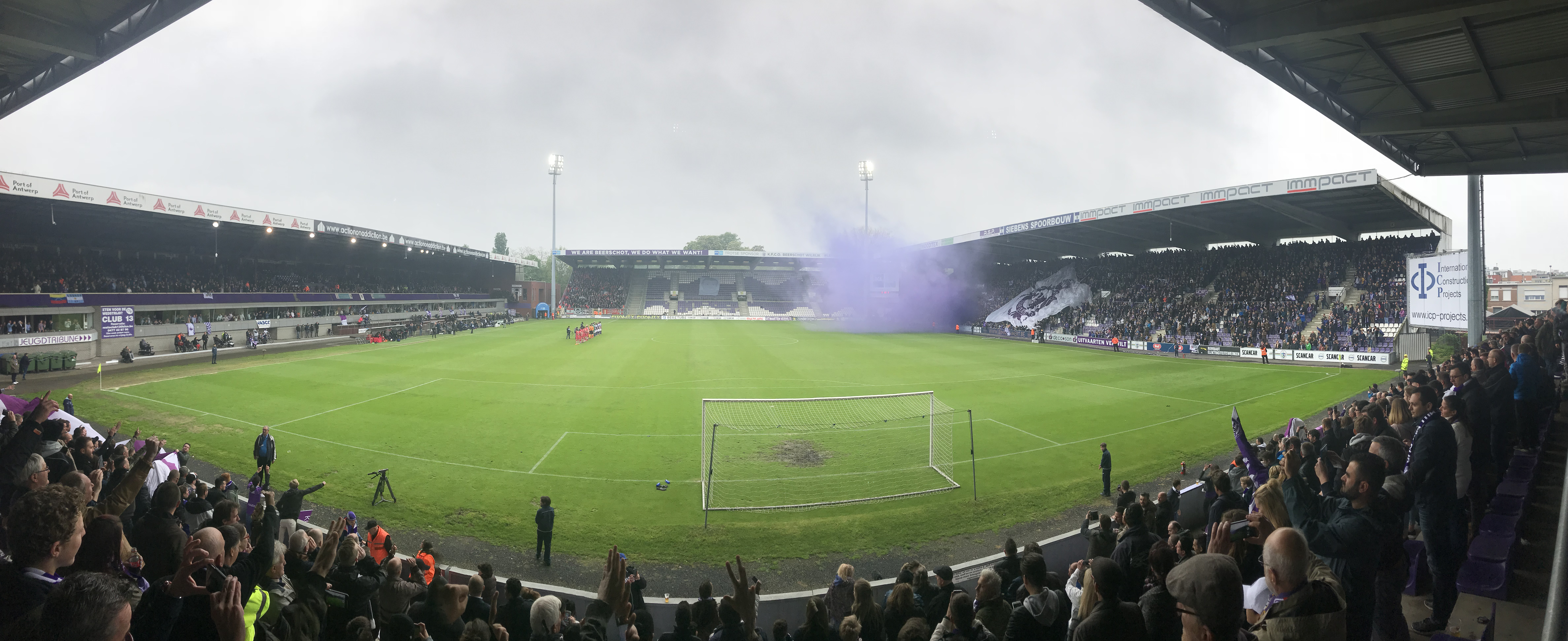
- Interactive map of Olympisch Stadion
- Location: Antwerp, Belgium
- Capacity: 12,771
- Surface: Grass

Construction
- Opened: 1920
- Renovated: 2000, 2012, 2018, 2025

Tenant
- Beerschot

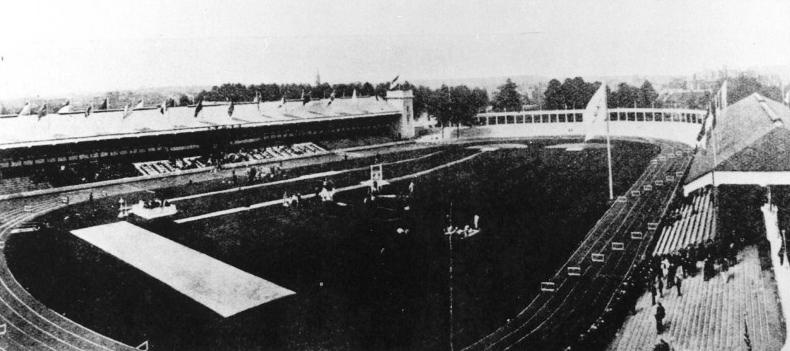
Olympisch Stadion in 1920

The Olympisch Stadion (Dutch pronunciation: [oːˈlɪmpiˌstaːdijɔn]) or Kielstadion (pronounced [ˈkilstaːdijɔn]) was built as the main stadium for the 1920 Summer Olympics in Antwerp. For those games, it hosted the athletics, equestrian, field hockey, football, gymnastics, modern pentathlon, rugby union, tug of war, weightlifting and korfball (demonstration) events. Following the Olympics it was converted to a football stadium. Its current tenant is K Beerschot VA, a Belgian football club. There are no remnants of the Olympic athletics track.

It is possible that Archibald Leitch was involved in the design of the stadium having made several visits prior to the Games.

Preceded by Stockholms Olympiastadion; Stockholm	Summer Olympic Games; Main Venue; 1920	Succeeded by Stade de Colombes; Paris
Preceded by Stockholms Olympiastadion; Stockholm	Olympic Athletics competitions Main Venue; 1920	Succeeded by Stade de Colombes; Paris
Preceded by Stockholms Olympiastadion; Stockholm	Summer Olympic Games; Men's Football final 1920	Succeeded by Stade de Colombes; Paris
