= 1920 Summer Olympics =

Multi-sport event in Antwerp, Belgium

Games of the VII Olympiad
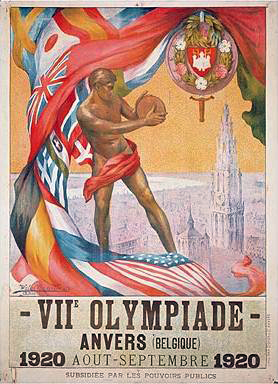
- Poster for the 1920 Summer Olympics
- Location: Antwerp, Belgium
- Nations: 29
- Athletes: 2,626 (2,561 men, 65 women)
- Events: 162 in 22 sports (28 disciplines)
- Opening: 14 August 1920
- Closing: 12 September 1920
- Opened by: King Albert I
- Stadium: Olympisch Stadion

The 1920 Summer Olympics (French: Jeux olympiques d'été de 1920; Dutch: Olympische Zomerspelen van 1920; German: Olympische Sommerspiele 1920), officially known as the Games of the VII Olympiad (French: Jeux de la VII^{e} olympiade; Dutch: Spelen van de VIIe Olympiade; German: Spiele der VII. Olympiade) and commonly known as Antwerp 1920 (French: Anvers 1920; Dutch and German: Antwerpen 1920), were an international multi-sport event held in 1920 in Antwerp, Belgium.

In March 1912, during the 13th session of the IOC, Belgium's bid to host the 1920 Summer Olympics was made by Baron Édouard de Laveleye, president of the Belgian Olympic Committee and of the Royal Belgian Football Association. No fixed host city was proposed at the time.

The 1916 Summer Olympics, to have been held in Berlin, capital of the German Empire, were cancelled due to World War I. When the Olympic Games resumed after the war, Antwerp was awarded the hosting rights to the 1920 Summer Games as a tribute to the Belgian people. The aftermath of the war and the Paris Peace Conference affected the Olympic Games not only due to new states being created but also by sanctions against the nations that lost the war and were blamed for starting it. Hungary, Germany, Austria, Bulgaria, and the Ottoman Empire were banned from competing in the Games. Soviet Russia had just emerged from the Civil War and chose not to attend the Games. Germany did not return to Olympic competition until 1928 and instead hosted a series of games called Deutsche Kampfspiele, starting with the Winter edition of 1922 (which predated the first Winter Olympics).

The United States won the most gold and overall medals at the 1920 Summer Games.

== Host city selection ==
In March 1912, during the 13th session of the IOC, the bid on behalf of Belgium to host the 1920 Summer Olympics was made by Baron Édouard de Laveleye, president of the Belgian Olympic Committee and of the Royal Belgian Football Association. No fixed host city was proposed at the time.

The organizing committee was created on 9 August 1913. It had four presidents:

- Édouard de Laveleye, president of the Belgian Olympic Committee
- Henri de Baillet-Latour, member of the IOC
- Robert Osterrieth, president of the Royal Yacht Club of Belgium
- Charles Cnoops, vice-president of the Belgian Fencing Association

Among the 22 vice presidents of the committee were people with a military or industrial background and further people from sports organizations, like Paul Havenith, president of the football and athletics club K. Beerschot V.A.C., and Nicolaas Jan Cupérus, president of the Belgian Gymnastics Federation.

The first action of the committee was to send an official letter to the IOC in Paris, confirming Antwerp as the city for the Belgian Olympic bid. With Antwerp confirmed as the Olympic Games host, Belgium began reconstructing the Beerschot Stadium into the Olympisch Stadion. Construction on the new Olympic stadium began in July 1919 and finished in May 1920.

In 1914, a 109-page brochure was created to promote the idea of Antwerp as a host city for the Olympics: Aurons-nous la VIIème Olympiade à Anvers? (Will we have the 7th Olympiad at Antwerp?). It was sent to all IOC members and was used during the 6th Olympic Congress in Paris in 1914, where the candidacies of Amsterdam (which would eventually host the 1928 Summer Olympics), Antwerp, Budapest, and Rome (which would eventually host the 1960 Summer Olympics) were discussed. Despite a slight preference at the time for Budapest, no final choice was made, and the outbreak of World War I soon afterwards prevented any further progress.

In 1915, Lyon made a bid for the 1920 Games, but after some discussion, they agreed to support Antwerp and postpone their bid until 1924 if Antwerp was liberated in time to organize the Games. The support for Belgium by cousin country France, then the leading country of the IOC, also meant that Amsterdam and Budapest (in an enemy state) had no chance for the 1920 games against Antwerp.

New candidacies from American cities did not have that disadvantage, and bids were received from Cleveland, Philadelphia, and Atlanta (which would eventually host the 1996 Summer Olympics), while Cuba also submitted a bid for Havana.

However, shortly after the armistice in November 1918, the IOC decided to award Antwerp their first preference if they were still willing to host the 1920 Games. In March 1919, the Belgian Olympic Committee decided to go ahead with the organization of the Games: on 5 April 1919, at a meeting in Lausanne, Antwerp was officially declared the host city for the games of the VIIth Olympiad.

== Organization ==
The 1920 Summer Games organizers had very little time to prepare. The time between the IOC's decision of choosing Antwerp as the host city and the opening ceremony was 1 year, 4 months, and 9 days, making this the shortest time for a host city to plan and organize an Olympic edition.

An executive committee was established on 17 April 1919, with Henri de Baillet-Latour as chairman and Alfred Verdyck, the secretary of the Belgian Union of Football Clubs, as general secretary. Seven commissions were created to deal with finances, accommodation, press relations, propaganda, schedules, transport, and festivities. Finances and scheduling proved to be the two hardest parts to tackle: the program of events was not published until February 1920, six months before the official start of the Games.

Between 23 and 30 April 1920, an ice hockey tournament marked the early start of the Games. Held in the "Palais de Glace" or Ice Palace in Antwerp, it was the first time that ice hockey was an Olympic sport.

The first stone of the new Olympisch Stadion was laid on 4 July 1919 by Jan De Vos, mayor of Antwerp, and inaugurated less than a year later on 23 May 1920 with a gymnastics demonstration.

When the Olympic Games began, the stadium was still unfinished, with some events being built over fortifications and others using existing locations. The athletes' quarters were crowded, and athletes slept on folding cots.

The nautical stadium, or Stade Nautique d'Antwerp, was built at the end of the Jan Van Rijswijcklaan, using the city ramparts there as a spectator's stand. Other events, like shooting, boxing, and equestrian sports, were held at pre-existing locations in and around Antwerp and as far away as Ostend.

The number of spectators was low throughout Antwerp's Summer Olympics because few people could afford tickets. In the closing days of the Olympic Games, students were allowed to attend the event for free. After the conclusion of the Olympic Games, Belgium recorded a loss of more than 600 million francs.

== Highlights ==
- The Olympic Games, being a symbol of peace and global solidarity, shone in Antwerp. These Olympics were the first in which the Olympic Oath was voiced, the first in which doves were released to symbolize peace, and the first in which the Olympic flag was flown to display the unity of the world's continents through its 5 rings.
- The United States won 41 gold, 27 silver, and 27 bronze medals. Sweden, Great Britain, Finland, and Belgium rounded out the five most successful medal-winning nations, while France and Belgium fielded the most athletes, with the United States ranking third in that statistic.
- The Games also featured a week of winter sports, with figure skating appearing for the first time since the 1908 Olympics and ice hockey making its Olympic debut.
- Nedo Nadi won five gold medals in the fencing events.
- At the age of 72, Sweden's 100-metre running deer double-shot event champion Oscar Swahn, who had participated in the 1908 and 1912 Games, came in second in the team event to become the oldest Olympic medal winner ever.
- 23-year-old Paavo Nurmi won the 10,000 m and 8,000 m cross-country races, took another gold in team cross country, and won a silver in the 5,000 m run. His contributions to Finland broke a record in track and field with nine medals.
- Duke Kahanamoku retained the 100 m swimming title he had won before the war.
- The sailing events were among some of the strangest moments in Olympic history:
  - there were originally 16 events scheduled but there were no entrants for the 9-metre, 1907 rating class nor the 8.5-metre 1919 rating class
  - the 12-foot dinghy event took place in two different countries. The final two races in the event were independently held in the Netherlands, on its own accord, supposedly because the only two competitors in the event were Dutch.
- Sport shooter Guilherme Paraense won Brazil's very first gold medal at the Olympic Games.
- The United States sent a women's swimming team for the first time, and the Americans won seven out of nine available swimming medals.

== Sports/Events ==
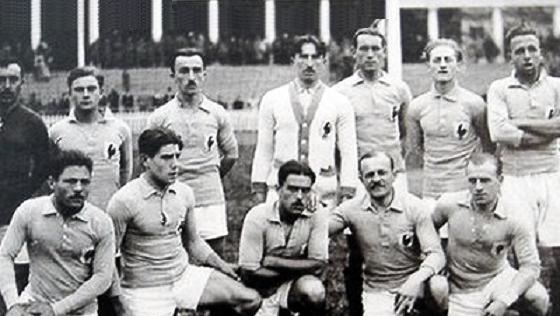
The France national football team at the 1920 Olympics.

There were 162 events in 28 disciplines that were part of the Olympic program in 1920. The number of events in each discipline is noted in parentheses.

- Aquatics
  - Diving (5)
  - Swimming (10)
  - Water polo (1)
- Archery (10)
- Athletics (29)
- Boxing (8)
- Cycling
  - Road (2)
  - Track (4)
- Equestrian
  - Dressage (1)
  - Eventing (2)
  - Jumping (2)
  - Vaulting (2)
- Fencing (6)
- Field hockey (1)
- Figure skating (3)
- Football (1)
- Gymnastics (4)
- Ice hockey (1)
- Modern pentathlon (1)
- Polo (1)
- Rowing (5)
- Rugby union (1)
- Sailing (14)
- Shooting (21)
- Tennis (5)
- Tug of war (1)
- Weightlifting (5)
- Wrestling (10)

Korfball was a demonstration sport. Women's water polo was a demonstration sport.

== Venues ==
The 1920 Summer Olympics featured seventeen sports venues. This marked the first time that the football tournament was spread throughout the country, which has mostly been the case since.

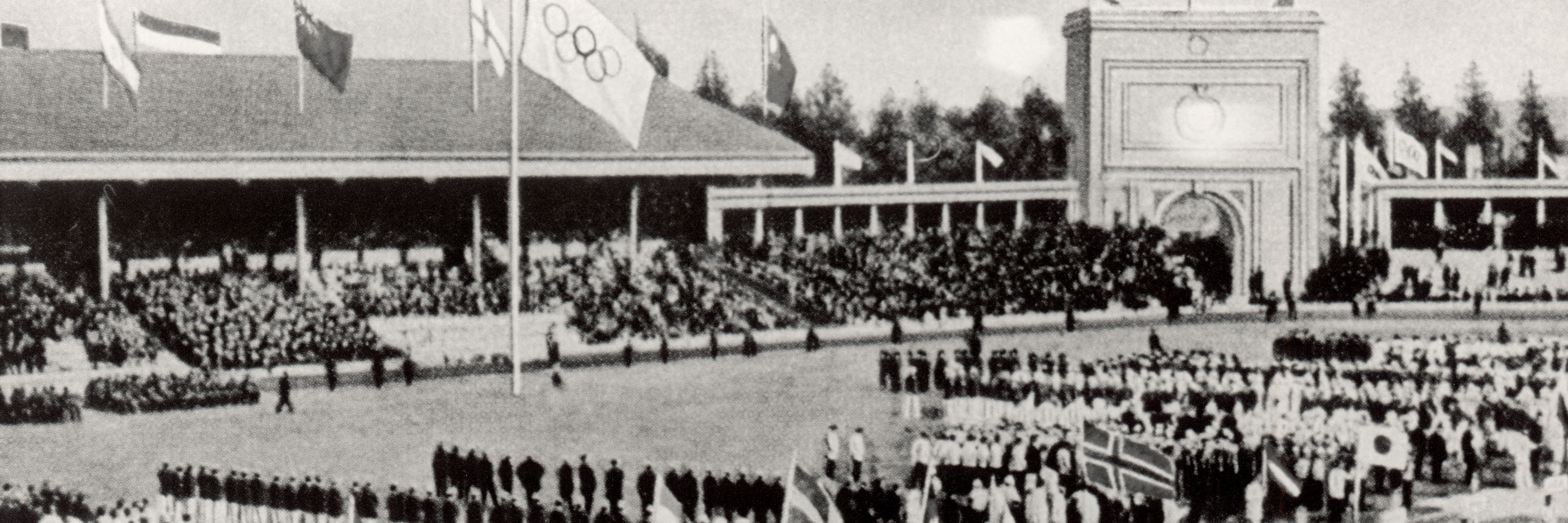
Photograph of the games at Antwerp, Belgium, 1920.

Venue	Sports	Capacity	Ref.
Antwerp	Cycling (road)	Not listed.	
Antwerp Zoo	Boxing, Wrestling	Not listed.	
Beerschot Tennis Club	Tennis	Not listed.	
Beverloo Camp	Shooting (pistol/rifle)	Not listed.	
Brussels–Scheldt Maritime Canal	Rowing	Not listed.	
Buiten Y (Amsterdam)	Sailing (12 foot dinghy)	Not listed.	
Gardens of the Egmont Palace (Brussels)	Fencing	Not listed.	
Hoogboom Military Camp	Shooting (trap shooting, running target)	Not listed.	
Jules Ottenstadion (Ghent)	Football (Italy-Egypt match).	Not listed.	
Nachtegalen Park	Archery	Not listed.	
Olympisch Stadion	Athletics, Equestrian, Field hockey, Football (final), Gymnastics, Modern pentathlon, Rugby union, Tug of war, Weightlifting	30,000	
Ostend	Polo, Sailing	Not listed.	
Palais de Glace d'Anvers	Figure skating, Ice hockey	Not listed.	
Stade Joseph Marien (Brussels)	Football	Not listed.	
Stade Nautique d'Antwerp	Diving, Swimming, Water polo	Not listed.	
Stadion Broodstraat	Football	Not listed.	
Vélodrome d'Anvers Zuremborg	Cycling (track)	Not listed.	

== Participating nations ==
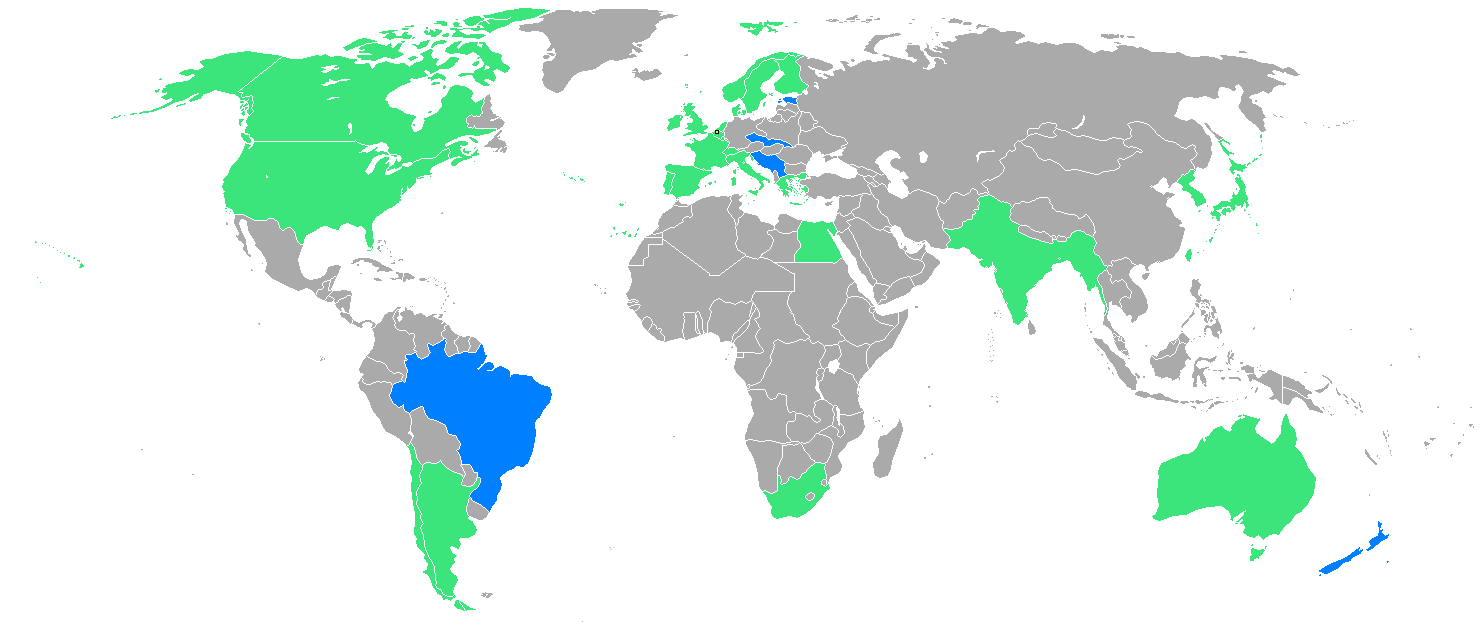
Participants in the 1920 games, with the nations in blue participating for the first time.

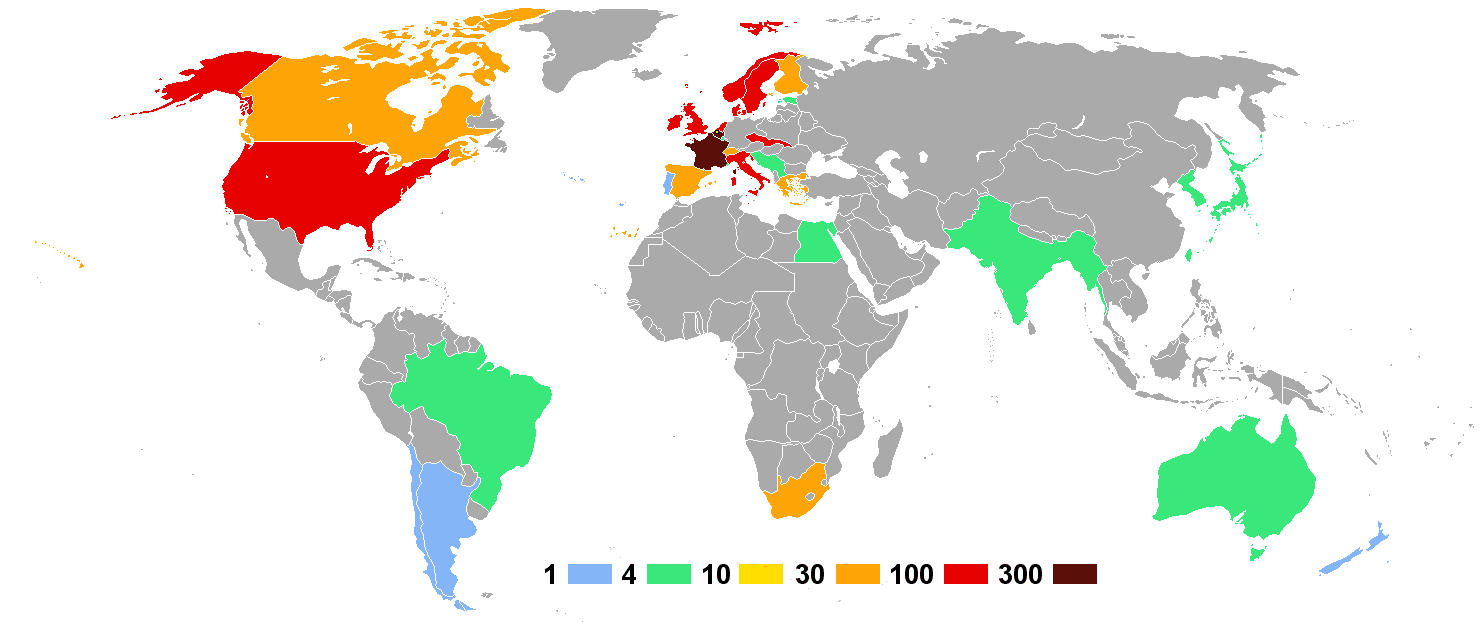
Number of athletes

A total of 29 nations participated in the Antwerp Games, only one more than in 1912, as Germany, Austria, Hungary, Bulgaria, and Turkey were not invited, having lost World War I and sanctioned for starting it. From the newly created European states, only Estonia took part, as Czechoslovakia succeeded Bohemia and the Kingdom of Serbs, Croats, and Slovenes succeeded Serbia, with both nations having sent athletes prior to World War I (in the case of Bohemia, as part of the Austrian Empire). Soviet Russia was busy with the Polish-Soviet War and therefore was unable to form an Olympic team (Poland, in turn, had never participated in the games before, only doing so in later editions). Brazil and Monaco competed as nations at the Olympic Games for the first time. New Zealand, which had competed as part of a combined team with Australia in 1908 and 1912, competed on its own for the first time. The games marked the return of Argentina and India to the competitions.

At the time, Australia, New Zealand, Canada, India, and South Africa were all part of the British Empire. Egypt was a British protectorate (a state not part of the British Empire but nonetheless administered by the United Kingdom).

Participating National Olympic Committees
- Argentina (1)
- Australia (13)
- Belgium (336) (host)
- Brazil (19)
- Canada (53)
- Chile (2)
- Czechoslovakia (121)
- Denmark (154)
- Egypt (22)
- Estonia (14)
- Finland (63)
- France (304)
- Great Britain (235)
- Greece (57)
- India (5)
- Italy (174)
- Japan (15)
- Luxembourg (25)
- Monaco (4)
- Netherlands (113)
- New Zealand (4)
- Norway (194)
- Portugal (13)
- South Africa (39)
- Spain (32)
- Sweden (260)
- Switzerland (77)
- United States (288)
- Yugoslavia (15)

- The Dominion of Newfoundland had one competitor, Eric Robertson. But as the dominion had no official Olympic committee, his nationality could not be confirmed, and he represented Great Britain.

As the local Olympic Organizing Committee went bankrupt during the Antwerp 1920 Games, no official report of the Games was ever produced. The documents of the Games were archived at the Belgium Olympic Committee headquarters in Brussels.

=== Number of athletes by National Olympic Committees ===
Country	Athletes
Belgium	336
France	304
United States	288
Sweden	260
Great Britain	235
Norway	194
Italy	174
Denmark	154
Netherlands	146
Czechoslovakia	121
Switzerland	77
Finland	63
Greece	57
Canada	53
South Africa	39
Spain	32
Luxembourg	25
Egypt	22
Brazil	19
Japan	15
Estonia	14
Australia	13
Portugal	13
Yugoslavia	12
India	5
Monaco	4
New Zealand	4
Chile	2
Argentina	1
Total	2,682

== Medal count ==
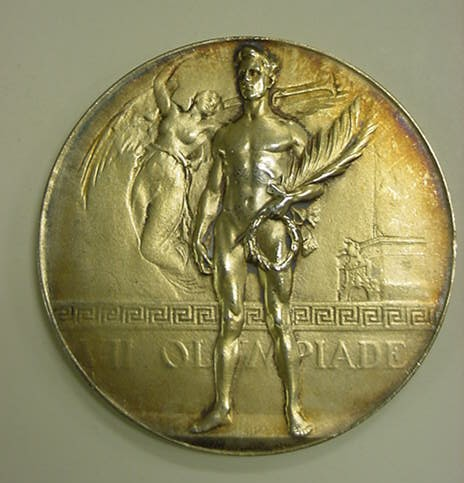
One of the 154 (identical) gold medals awarded at the Games of the VII Olympiad

These are the top ten nations that won medals at the 1920 Games. These were the first Olympics where the host nation failed to win the most medals overall.

* Host nation (Belgium)

Rank	Nation	Gold	Silver	Bronze	Total
1	United States	41	27	27	95
2	Sweden	19	20	25	64
3	Finland	15	10	9	34
4	Great Britain	14	16	13	43
5	Belgium*	14	11	11	36
6	Norway	13	9	9	31
7	Italy	13	5	5	23
8	France	9	19	13	41
9	Netherlands	4	2	5	11
Totals (9 entries)		142	119	117	378

== See also ==
- List of IOC country codes

== Notes ==
Summer Olympics
Preceded by Berlin	VII Olympiad; Antwerp; 1920	Succeeded by Paris
