= 1812 in Norway =

- Centuries: 17th; 18th; 19th; 20th; 21st
- Decades: 1790s; 1800s; 1810s; 1820s; 1830s
- See also: 1812 in Denmark; List of years in Norway

Events in the year 1812 in Norway.

== Incumbents ==
- Monarch: Frederick VI .

== Events ==
- 6 July – In the Battle of Lyngør, the Danish-Norwegian frigate HDMS Najaden was sunk by the British ships HMS Dictator and HMS Calypso.

== Arts and literature ==
- Grøndahl & Søn Forlag publishing house, was established.

== Births ==
- 6 January – Knud Knudsen, linguist (d.1895).
- 15 January – Peter Christen Asbjørnsen, writer and scholar (d.1885).
- 26 January – Andreas Grimelund, bishop (d.1896)
- 1 March – Iver Steen Thomle, jurist (d.1889)
- 28 November – Ludvig Mathias Lindeman, composer and organist (d.1887)
- 11 December – Jørgen Tandberg Ebbesen, politician (d.1887)

=== Full date unknown ===
- Hans Jensen Blom, politician (d.1875)
- Nils Elias Børresen, politician
- Christian Hansen Vennemoe, politician
- Torbjørg Utne, hotelier (died 1903).

== Deaths ==
- 26 October – Hans Peter Holm, naval officer (b. 1772).
