= 1889 in Norway =

- Centuries: 17th; 18th; 19th; 20th; 21st
- Decades: 1860s; 1870s; 1880s; 1890s; 1900s
- See also: 1889 in Sweden; List of years in Norway

Events in the year 1889 in Norway.

== Incumbents ==
- Monarch – Oscar II.
- Prime Minister: Johan Sverdrup, then Emil Stang

== Events ==
- The metric system was introduced in Norway (the actual law having been passed in 1875).
- The Scandinavian mile was introduced in Norway.

== Arts and literature ==
- The local newspaper Farsunds avis was established.
- The local newspaper Lindesnes was established.

== Notable births ==
- 20 January – Tryggve Gran, aviator, explorer and author (died 1980)
- 2 February – Hartmann Bjørnsen, gymnast and Olympic gold medallist (died 1974)
- 3 February – Andreas Strand, gymnast and Olympic silver medallist (died 1958)
- 28 February – Hermann Helgesen, gymnast and Olympic silver medallist (died 1963)
- 16 February – Kristian Mathias Fimland, politician
- 22 April – Jacob Pedersen, track and field athlete (died 1961)
- 27 April – Arnulf Øverland, author (died 1968)
- 2 May – Margit Schiøtt, politician (died 1946)
- 16 May – Johan Faye, sailor and Olympic silver medallist (died 1975)
- 20 May – Rolf Lie, gymnast and Olympic gold medallist
- 4 June – Thor Jensen, gymnast and Olympic bronze medallist (died 1950)
- 18 June – Per Krohg, artist (died 1965)
- 9 July – Nils Thomas, sailor and Olympic silver medallist (died 1979)
- 17 August – Lalla Carlsen, singer and actress (died 1967).
- 25 August – Aslaug Vaa, poet and playwright (died 1965).
- 2 October – Ingolf Rød, sailor and Olympic gold medallist (died 1963)
- 24 October – Anders Kristian Orvin, geologist and explorer (died 1980)
- 5 November – Einar Staff, wholesaler (died 1972).
- 20 November – Nils Fixdal, athlete (died 1972)
- 26 November – Olaf Ørvig, sailor and Olympic gold medallist (died 1939)
- 2 December – Harald Færstad, gymnast and Olympic silver medallist (died 1979)
- 3 December – Edvin Paulsen, gymnast and Olympic bronze medallist (died 1963)
- 26 December – Ragnhild Kaarbø, painter (died 1949).

=== Full date unknown ===
- Kornelius Bergsvik, politician (died 1975)
- Thor Bjørklund, carpenter and inventor of the cheese slicer (died 1975)
- Johan Cappelen, jurist and politician (died 1947)
- Gunnar Gunnarsson Helland, Hardanger fiddle maker (died 1976)
- Asbjørn Lindboe, politician and Minister (died 1967)
- Henry Rudi, huntsman and polar bear hunter (died 1970)
- G. Unger Vetlesen, shipbuilder and philanthropist (died 1959)

== Notable deaths ==
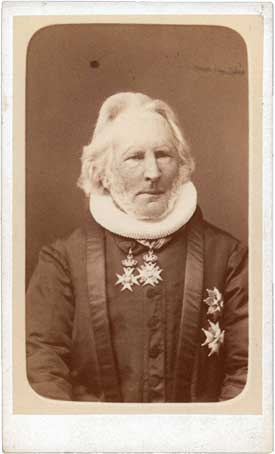
Georg Prahl Harbitz

- 10 January – Martin Andreas Udbye, composer and organist (born 1820)
- 25 January –
  - Johan Jeremiassen, ship-owner, consul and politician (born 1843)
  - Johan Lauritz Sundt, industrialist (born 1828).
- 28 February – Gustava Kielland, author and missionary (born 1800)
- 10 April – Christian Collett Kjerschow, politician (born 1821)
- 24 June – August Thomle, jurist and politician (born 1816)
- 29 June – Gustav Christian Gjøs, politician (born 1810)
- 16 September – Iver Steen Thomle, jurist (born 1812)
- 19 October – Jacob Kielland, naval officer and politician (born 1825)
- 23 December – Johan Jørgen Lange Hanssen, politician (born 1821)
- Job Dischington Bødtker, jurist and politician (born 1818)
- Ole Jacob Broch, politician and Minister (born 1818)
- Halvor Olsen Folkestad, councillor of state (born 1807)
- Ketil Motzfeldt, politician and Minister (born 1814)
