= 1809 in Norway =

- Centuries: 17th; 18th; 19th; 20th; 21st
- Decades: 1780s; 1790s; 1800s; 1810s; 1820s
- See also: 1809 in Denmark; List of years in Norway

Events in the year 1809 in Norway.

== Incumbents ==
- Monarch: Frederick VI .

== Events ==
- 20 January – HMS Claudia was wrecked off Kristiansand.
- 4 July – The village of Hasvik was attacked by the British Royal Navy brigs HMS Snake and HMS Fancy.
- 10 July – 1,800 men under the command of Major General Georg Frederik von Krogh attacked Jemtland from Norway.
- 22 July - The British Royal Navy brigs HMS Snake and HMS Fancy attacked the town of Hammerfest.
- 25 July – Christian August of Augustenborg is appointed Steward of Norway.
- 10 December – The Dano-Swedish War of 1808–1809 ends.

== Arts and literature ==
- Autumn – Jacob Aall publishes the pamphlet Fædrelandske Ideer where he demands a Norwegian university, national bank and better general education.

== Births ==
- 24 February – Haagen Ludvig Bergh, politician (d.1852)
- 23 September – Oluf Steen Julius Berner, politician (d.1885)

=== Full date unknown ===
- Svend Foyn, whaler (d.1894)
- Ludvig Johan Carl Manthey, civil servant (d.1875)

== Deaths ==
- 3 May – Niels Carlsen, timber merchant, landowner, shipowner and banker (born 1734).
- 29 July – Evert Andersen, navy officer (b.1772)
- 9 October – Niels Stockfleth Darre, military officer (b.1765)
- 27 October – Peter Westerstrøm, mass murderer (b.1779)

=== Full date unknown ===
- Sveinung Svalastoga, rose painter (b.1772)
