= 1808 in Norway =

- Centuries: 17th; 18th; 19th; 20th; 21st
- Decades: 1780s; 1790s; 1800s; 1810s; 1820s
- See also: 1808 in Denmark; List of years in Norway

Events in the year 1808 in Norway.

== Incumbents ==
- Monarch: Christian VII (until 13 March); then Frederick VI.

== Events ==
- Dano-Swedish War of 1808–1809:
  - 14 March – Denmark-Norway declares war on Sweden.
  - 18 April – Battle of Lier.
  - 19–20 April – Battle of Toverud.
  - 20 April – 7 May – Battle of Rødenes.
  - 25 April – Battle of Trangen.
  - 18 May – Battle of Mobekk.
  - 10 June – Battle of Prestebakke.
  - 12 September – Battle of Berby.
  - 7 December – An armistice agreement between Denmark–Norway and Sweden came into force. It could be terminated on 48 hours notice, but was applicable for the rest of the war. The armistice broke 2 July the next year.
- Gunboat War:
  - 16 May – Battle of Alvøen.
- 31 December – The Saksebøl Slaughter.

== Arts and literature ==
- 28 January – The first issue of the newspaper Tiden was published in Christiania (now Oslo).

== Births ==
- 4 March – Frederik Stang, lawyer, public servant and politician, Norway's first Prime Minister (d. 1884)
- 17 June – Henrik Wergeland, poet (d. 1845)
- 28 July – Ulrik Frederik Lange, politician (d. 1878)

=== Full date unknown ===
- Christen Larsen Arneberg, politician
- Ola Antonson Holsen, politician (d. 1864)
- Nils Jønsberg, priest and politician (d. 1885)
- Hans Jensen Krog, politician (d. 1897)
- Sjur Aasmundsen Sexe, mineralogist (d. 1888)

== Deaths ==
- 29 April – Nicolay Peter Drejer, military officer (born 1773)
- 16 May – George Edmund Byron Bettesworth, navy officer (born 1785).
- 16 November – Envold de Falsen, lawyer, poet, actor and statesman (born 1755).
- 20 December – Arent Greve, goldsmith and painter (born 1733).
