= 1806 in Norway =

- Centuries: 17th; 18th; 19th; 20th; 21st
- Decades: 1780s; 1790s; 1800s; 1810s; 1820s
- See also: 1806 in Denmark; List of years in Norway

Events in the year 1806 in Norway.

== Incumbents ==
- Monarch: Christian VII.

== Events ==
- The first Norwegian assurance associations for ships were established.

== Births ==
- 2 February – Bersvend Martinussen Røkkum, politician (d.1867)
- 2 March – Carl Andreas Fougstad, politician (d.1871)
- 7 August – Tellef Dahll Schweigaard, politician (d.1886)
- 15 November – Hans Severin Arentz, politician (d.1875)

=== Full date unknown ===
- Hans J. C. Aall, politician (d.1894)
- Peder Paulsen Anzjøn, politician
- Peter Munch Brager, priest and politician
- Daniel Otto Isaachsen, businessperson and politician (d.1891)
- Jacob Tostrup, goldsmith and jeweller (d.1890)

== Deaths ==
=== Full date unknown ===
- Ole Rødder, violinist (b.1743).
