= 1811 in Norway =

- Centuries: 17th; 18th; 19th; 20th; 21st
- Decades: 1790s; 1800s; 1810s; 1820s; 1830s
- See also: 1811 in Denmark; List of years in Norway

Events in the year 1811 in Norway.

== Incumbents ==
- Monarch: Frederick VI .

== Events ==
- 16 March - Battle of Grimstad Bay.
- 29 May - The Society for the Welfare of Oslo is founded.
- 19 June - The town of Drammen is founded.
- 2 September - University of Oslo is founded. It is the first university founded in the Dano-Norwegian Union.

== Arts and literature ==
- The Norwegian journal Historisk-philosophiske Samlinger (Historical-Philosophical Collections) first issue was published.

== Births ==
- 10 October – Nils Christian Irgens, military officer, politician and Minister (d.1878)
- 17 December – Jens Landmark, military officer and politician (d.1880)

=== Full date unknown ===
- Jørres Schelderup Hansen, politician
- Frederik Christian Stoud Platou, politician (d.1891)

== Deaths ==
- 8 November - Honoratus Bonnevie, physician (b.1726)
