= 1952 in Norway =

- Centuries: 18th; 19th; 20th; 21st
- Decades: 1930s; 1940s; 1950s; 1960s; 1970s
- See also: List of years in Norway

Events in the year 1952 in Norway.

== Incumbents ==
- Monarch – Haakon VII.
- Prime Minister – Oscar Torp (Labour Party)

== Events ==
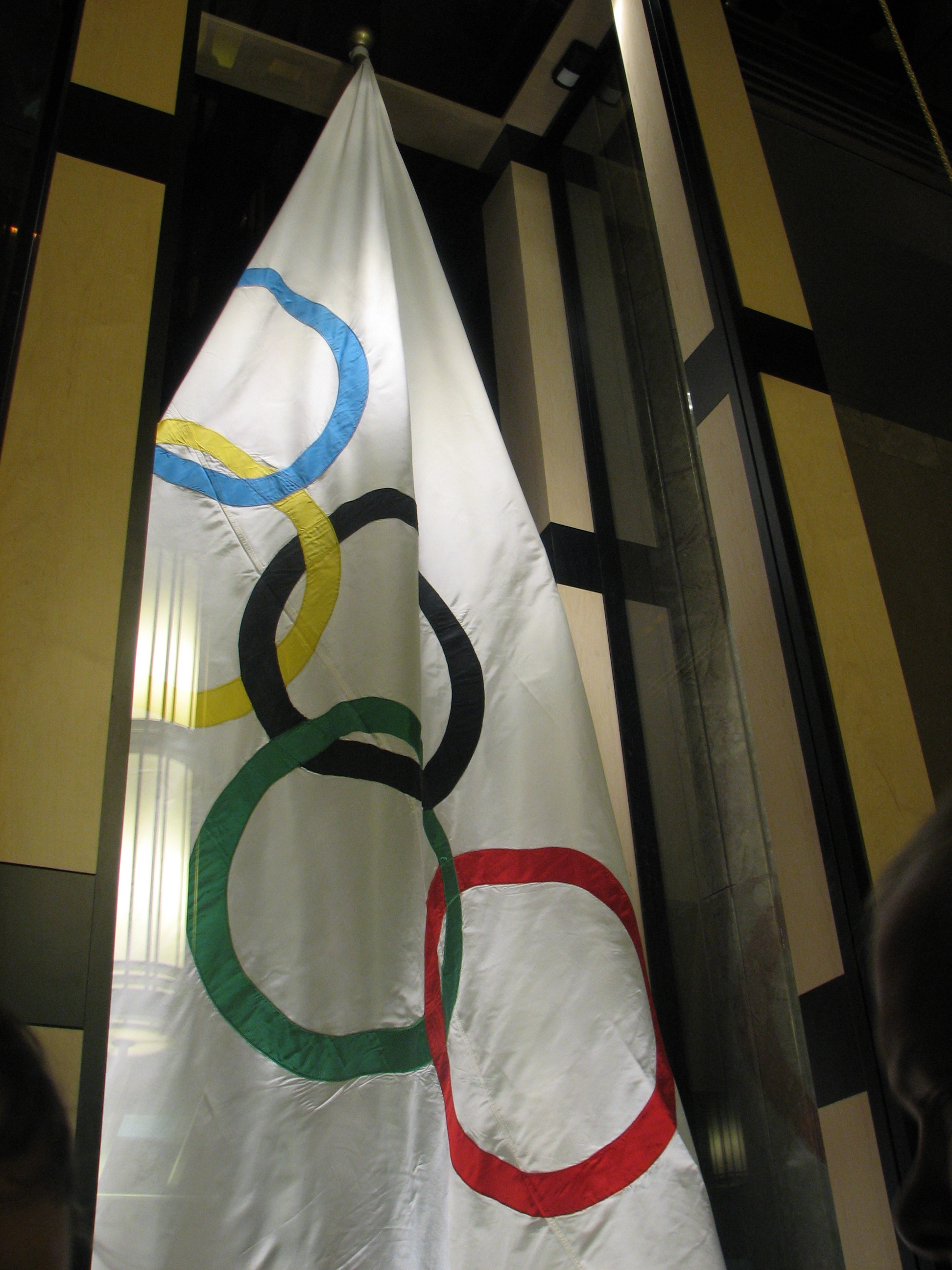
The "Oslo flag" used during the closing ceremonies of the 1952 Winter Games

- 7 January – 15 people are killed in a mine explosion in Svalbard.
- 14–25 February – 1952 Winter Olympics are held in Oslo.
- Around April 4 five Norwegian seal hunting vessels went down in a storm in the West Ice. The West Ice accidents claimed 78 lives in total.
- 1 September - Postwar rationing of sugar and coffee ended.
- 24 November – Folketeatret (lit. The People's Theatre) opened in Oslo.

== Popular culture ==
=== Sports ===
- Olaf Barda, chess player, becomes the first Norwegian to be awarded the title of International Master

=== Film ===
- 20 March – Thor Heyerdahl received the Academy Award for Best Documentary Feature at the 24th Academy Awards for the Kon-Tiki film.

== Notable births ==
- 1 January – Aksel Nærstad, political activist and advisor (died 2022).
- 25 January – Inga Balstad, politician
- 11 March – Vigdis Giltun, politician
- 6 March – Nils Johan Ringdal, author and historian (died 2008)
- 28 March – Espen Salberg, ballroom dancer
- 15 April – Ragnar Hovland, novelist, essayist, poet, and writer of children's books.
- 25 April – Ketil Bjørnstad, pianist and composer
- 2 May – Gunda Johansen, politician
- 13 May – Lars Amund Vaage, author and playwright
- 19 May – Guri Ingebrigtsen, politician (died 2020)
- 19 June – Sidsel Endresen, jazz singer
- 25 June – Radka Toneff, jazz singer (died 1982)
- 27 June – Asle Amundsen, politician
- 10 July – Kari Husøy, politician
- 18 July – Per Petterson, novelist
- 27 July – Torfinn Bjarkøy, civil servant
- 4 August – Karsten Klepsvik, diplomat (died 2025).
- 8 August – Jostein Gaarder, author
- 11 August – Finn Sletten, jazz drummer
- 19 August – Lillian Müller, model and actress
- 9 September – Per Jørgensen, jazz trumpeter
- 18 September – Gunn Olsen, politician
- 23 September – Unni Holmen, artistic gymnast.
- 25 October – Helen Fløisand, politician
- 25 October – Tove Nilsen, writer.
- 8 November – Carl Haakon Waadeland, musicologist and drummer
- 11 November – Ole Robert Sunde, writer.
- 18 November – Gerd Janne Kristoffersen, politician
- 28 November – Ole Thomsen, jazz guitarist
- 16 December – Jon Laukvik, organist

=== Full date unknown ===
- Anne-Lise Bakken, politician and Minister
- Magnus Takvam, journalist

== Notable deaths ==
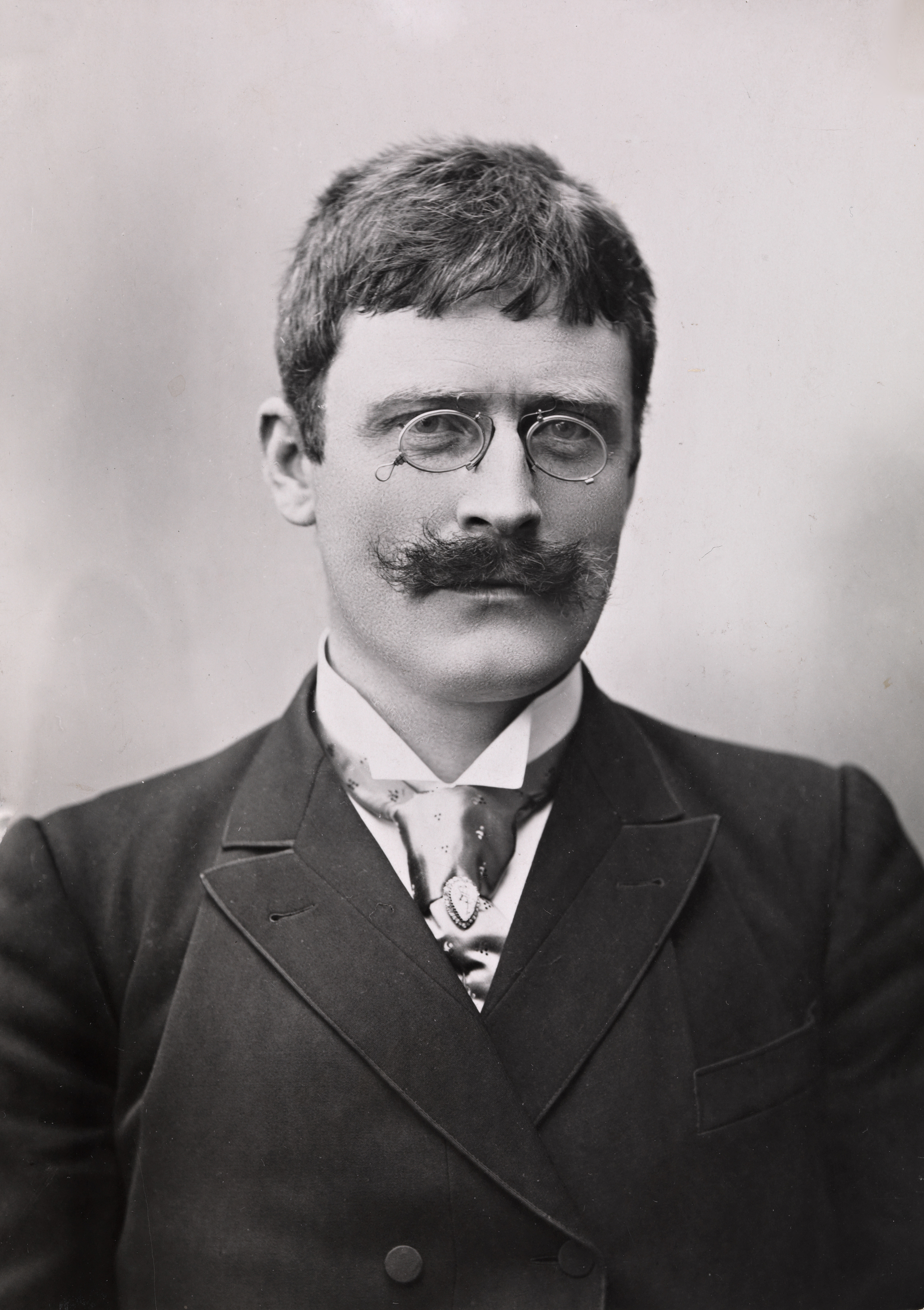
Knut Hamsun

- 11 February – Ola Torstensen Lyngstad, politician (born 1894)
- 14 February – Johan Clementz, boxer (born 1894)
- 19 February – Knut Hamsun, author, Nobel Prize in Literature laureate (born 1859)
- 13 March – Johan Nygaardsvold, politician and Prime Minister of Norway (born 1879)
- 20 April – Sigurd Maseng, diplomat (born 1894)
- 14 May – Carl Julius Alvin Westerlund, politician (born 1885)
- 13 June – Andreas Brecke, sailor and Olympic gold medallist (born 1879)
- 3 August – Even Ulving, painter (born 1863).
- 26 September – Aslak Nilsen, politician (born 1898).
- 28 September – Ingvald Tøndel, politician (born 1887)
- 14 November – Aldor Ingebrigtsen, politician (born 1888)
- 14 December – Fartein Valen, composer and musical theorist (born 1887)

=== Full date unknown ===
- Einar Borch, landowner and politician (born 1870).
- Adam Egede-Nissen, politician (born 1868)
- Christian Wegner Haaland, ship-owner and politician (born 1892)
- Knut Liestøl, politician and Minister (born 1881)
- William Martin Nygaard, publisher and politician (born 1865)
