= 1814 in Norway =

- Centuries: 17th; 18th; 19th; 20th; 21st
- Decades: 1790s; 1800s; 1810s; 1820s; 1830s
- See also: 1814 in Denmark; 1814 in Sweden; List of years in Norway

Events in the year 1814 in Norway.

== Incumbents ==
- Monarch: Frederick VI (until February 7), then Christian Frederick (May 17 – October 10), then Charles II (since November 4)

== Overview ==
1814 has historically been considered the most important year in the history of Norway. Sovereignty was transferred from the King of Denmark to the King of Sweden. The Constitution of Norway was signed at Eidsvoll on May 17, later to be designated and celebrated as Norwegian Constitution Day. For a detailed account of the events surrounding the re-formation of the country in modern times, see the article Kingdom of Norway (1814).

== Events ==
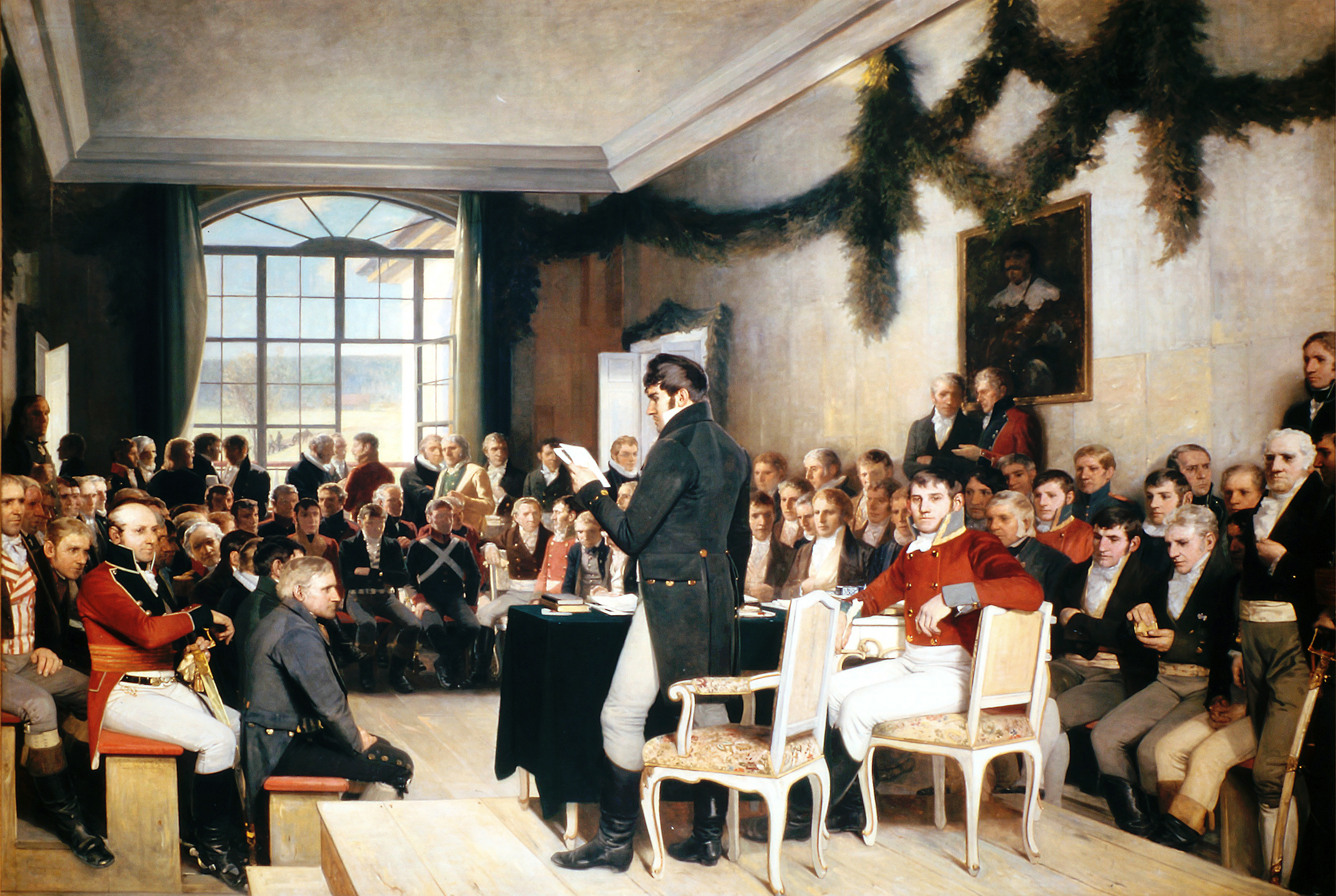
The Constituent Assembly at Eidsvoll in 1814.

- 14 January – Frederick VI of Denmark-Norway ceded the Kingdom of Norway to Charles XIII of Sweden in return for Swedish Pomerania, otherwise known as Western Pomerania. Denmark also keeps the Norwegian overseas possessions: Faroe Islands, Iceland and Greenland, as part of the Treaty of Kiel.
- 11 February – Norway's independence was proclaimed, marking the ultimate end of the Kalmar Union.
- 16 February – The meeting of notables took place at Eidsvoll Verk.
- 10 April – The Norwegian Constituent Assembly convened at Eidsvoll.
- 12 April – The Royal Norwegian Navy was re-established.
- 16 May – The Constitution of Norway was adopted by the Constituent Assembly.
- 17 May – The Constitution of Norway was signed and the Danish Crown Prince Christian Frederik was elected King of Norway by the Constituent Assembly.
- 20 May – The last day in session for the Constituent Assembly.
- 26 July – The Swedish campaign against Norway started.
  - 29 July – Battle of Hvaler, the first battle of the war.
  - 1 August – Battle of Tistedalen.
  - 2 August – Battle of Lier.
  - 4 August – Siege of Fredrikstad.
  - 5 August – Battle of Matrand.
  - 6 August – Battle of Rakkestad.
  - 9 August – Battle of Langnes.
  - 14 August –Battle of Kjølberg Bridge, the last battle of the war.
- 14 August – The Convention of Moss was signed, ending the Swedish campaign against Norway with a Swedish victory.
- 10 October – Christian Frederik abdicated the throne of Norway.
- 4 November – The first session of the Norwegian Parliament elected Charles II as King in a personal union between Sweden and Norway.

== Births ==
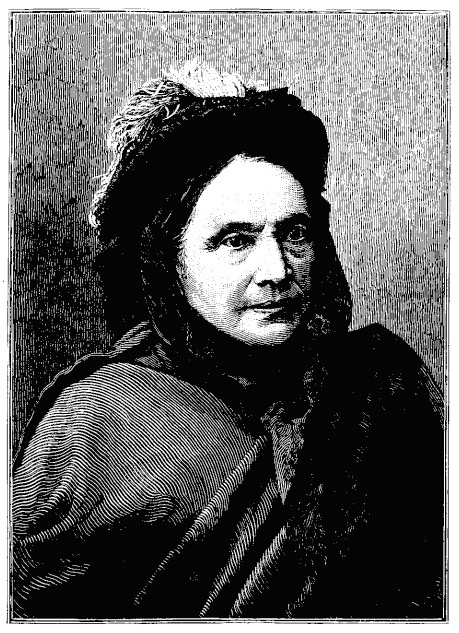
Marie Colban

- 9 February – Andrine Christensen, actress and dancer (died 1853)
- 1 April – Søren Jaabæk, politician and farmer (died 1894)
- 7 May – Henriette Hansen, actress and ballerina (died 1892)
- 27 May – Harald Nicolai Storm Wergeland, military officer, politician, Minister and mountaineer (died 1893)
- 18 December – Marie Colban, writer (died 1884).

=== Full date unknown ===
- Peder Krabbe Gaarder, jurist and political theorist (died 1883)
- Ketil Motzfeldt, politician and Minister (died 1889)
- Nils Fredrik Severin Thambs, politician (died 1885)

== Deaths ==
- 30 January – Christian Kølle, educator (born 1736)
- 28 August – Erik Must Angell, jurist and politician (born 1744)
- 9 September – Niels Andreas Vibe, military officer (born 1759).
- 17 December – Christian Colbjørnsen, chief justice (born 1749)
