= 1807 in Norway =

- Centuries: 17th; 18th; 19th; 20th; 21st
- Decades: 1780s; 1790s; 1800s; 1810s; 1820s
- See also: 1807 in Denmark; List of years in Norway

Events in the year 1807 in Norway.

== Incumbents ==
- Monarch: Christian VII.

== Events ==
- 12 August - Start of the Gunboat War between Denmark-Norway and the United Kingdom.
- 1 September - The Norwegian Government commission was formed.
- 18 September - British forces blows up Fredriksholm Fortress, four Englishmen was killed in the blast.
- 9 October - Overkriminalretten is established. It was Norway's highest court until 1815, when the Supreme Court of Norway was established.
- 2 November - The Royal Norwegian Navy was formed.
- Porsgrunn is granted limited city status. Full city status is granted in 1842.

== Arts and literature ==
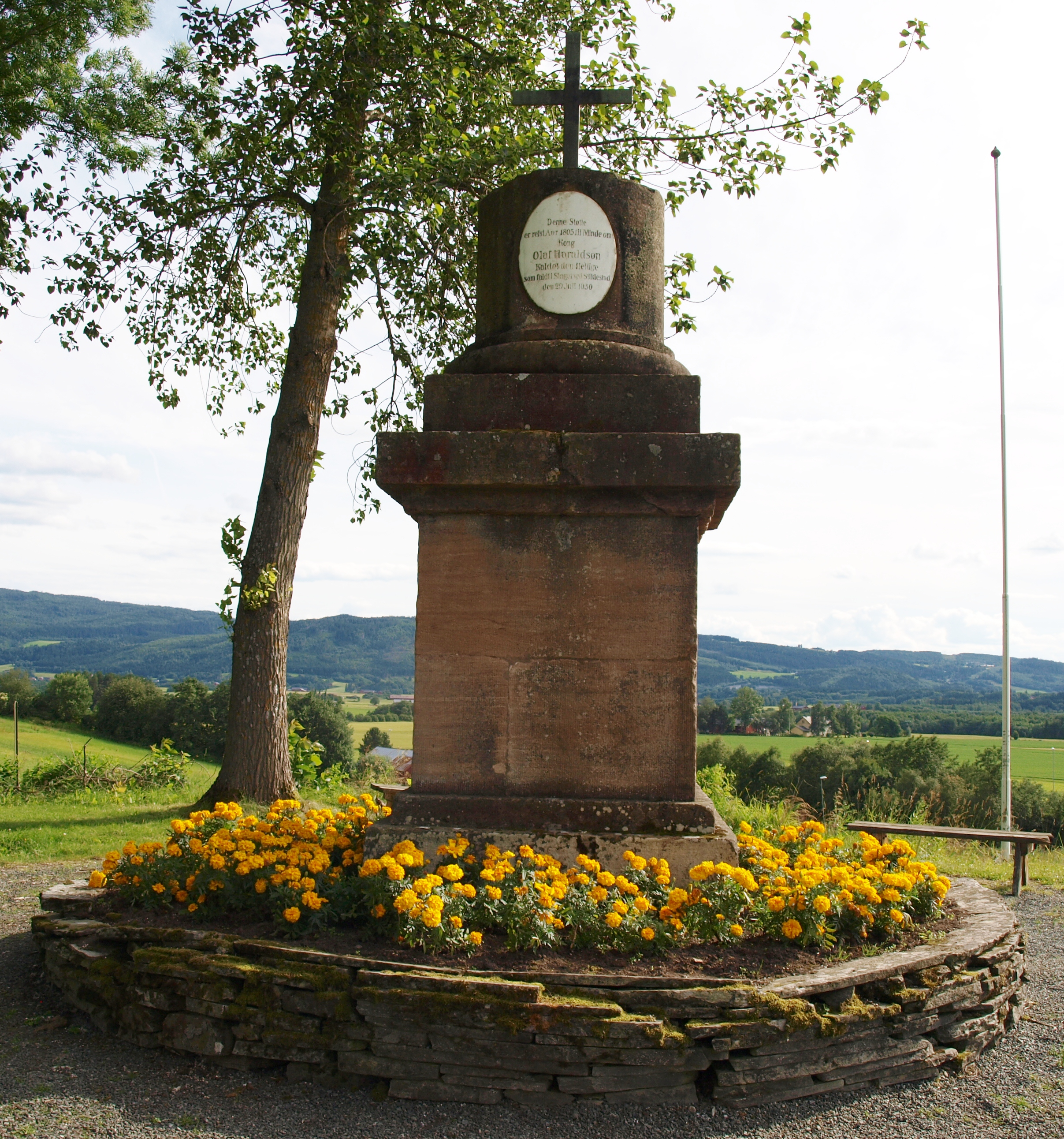
Olavsstøtta.

- The oldest monument in Norway; Olavsstøtta is erected.
- Old Karasjok Church was built.

== Births ==
=== January to June ===
- 19 January – Peter Hersleb Graah Birkeland, bishop (d.1896)
- 27 January – Ulrik Anton Motzfeldt, jurist and politician (d.1865)
- 14 March – Josephine of Leuchtenberg, Swedish and Norwegian queen (d.1876)

=== July to December ===
- 29 November – Peter Severin Steenstrup, naval officer and businessperson (d.1863)
- 22 December – Johan Sebastian Welhaven, poet and critic (d.1873)

=== Full date unknown ===
- Nils Fredrik Julius Aars, priest and politician (d.1865)
- Halvor Olsen Folkestad, councillor of state (d.1889)
- Peter Tidemand Malling, bookseller, printer and publisher (d.1878)
- Hans Wille, priest and politician (d.1877)

== Deaths ==
- 16 September – Jochum Brinch Lund, merchant (b.1743).
