= 1810 in Norway =

- Centuries: 17th; 18th; 19th; 20th; 21st
- Decades: 1790s; 1800s; 1810s; 1820s; 1830s
- See also: 1810 in Denmark; List of years in Norway

Events in the year 1810 in Norway.

== Incumbents ==
- Monarch: Frederick VI .

== Events ==
- 11 January - Prince Frederik of Hesse is appointed Steward of Norway.
- 14-15 July - Large parts of the town of Mandal burns down.
- 23 July - Battle of Silda.
- 30 November - The Norwegian Government commission was dissolved.

== Arts and literature ==
- Det Dramatiske Selskab in Laurvig is founded.
- The construction of Lade Mansion in Trondheim is finished.

== Births ==
- 20 January – Gustav Christian Gjøs, politician (d.1889)
- 5 February – Ole Bull, violinist (d.1880)
- 17 April – Johan Reinert Reiersen, emigration activist and early Texas pioneer (d.1864)
- 25 September – Peder Sather, banker and philanthropist (d.1886)
- 15 December – Peter Andreas Munch, University professor and historian (d.1863)

=== Full date unknown ===
- Simon Karenius Høegh, bank treasurer, merchant and politician (d.1893)
- Ole Hovelsen Mustad, businessperson and politician (d.1884)

== Deaths ==
- 1 November - Frederik Georg Adeler, county official and landowner (b.1736)
