= 1890 in Norway =

- Centuries: 17th; 18th; 19th; 20th; 21st
- Decades: 1870s; 1880s; 1890s; 1900s; 1910s
- See also: 1890 in Sweden; List of years in Norway

Events in the year 1890 in Norway.

== Incumbents ==
- Monarch – Oscar II.
- Prime Minister –

== Events ==
- Almost half of the town of Hammerfest burns down.

== Arts and literature ==
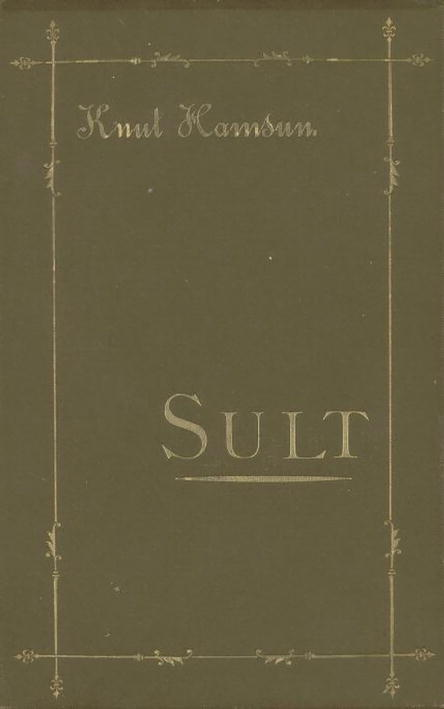
Sult, by Knut Hamsun.

- Sult, novel by Knut Hamsun is published.

== Births ==
=== January to June ===
- 10 January – Kirsten Utheim Toverud, pediatrician (died 1949).
- 16 January – Henry Reinholt, footballer (died 1980).
- 23 January – Leon Aurdal, painter (died 1949).
- 13 February – Georg Tysland, engineer and metallurgist
- 18 March – Gunnar Andersen, international soccer player and ski jumper (died 1968)
- 4 April – Per Kvist, writer, actor (died 1947).
- 26 April – Arne Gjedrem, politician (died 1978)
- 26 April – Thoralf Klouman, satirical illustrator and actor (died 1940).
- 11 May – Helge Løvland, decathlete and Olympic gold medallist (died 1984)
- 14 May – Olaf Johannessen, rifle shooter (died 1977)
- 14 May – Harald Houge Torp, politician (died 1972)
- 7 June – Hjalmar Riiser-Larsen, aviation pioneer, polar explorer and businessman (died 1965)

=== July to September ===
- 10 July – Marie Ingeborg Skau, politician (died 1966)
- 25 July – Torleiv Corneliussen, sailor and Olympic gold medallist (died 1975)
- 31 July – Håkon Tønsager, rower (died 1975)
- 19 August – Konrad Knudsen, painter, journalist and politician (died 1959)
- 29 August – Peder Furubotn, cabinetmaker and politician (died 1975).
- 3 September – Per Fokstad, teacher, politician and intellectual (died 1973)
- 17 September – Sverre Grøner, gymnast and Olympic silver medallist (died 1972)

=== October to December ===
- 1 October – Halfdan Haneborg Hansen, military officer, Milorg pioneer and businessman (died 1974).
- 23 October – Anders Johanneson Bøyum, politician (died 1962)
- 26 October – John Aae, politician (died 1968)
- 23 November – Frithjof Olstad, rower and Olympic bronze medallist (died 1956)
- 14 December – Sigurd Hoel, author and publishing consultant (died 1960)

=== Full date unknown ===
- Harald Langhelle, newspaper editor and politician (died 1942)
- Ragnar Skancke, politician and Minister (died 1948)
- Bjørn Talén, opera singer (died 1945)

== Deaths ==
=== Full date unknown ===
- Ole Andreas Bachke, politician and Minister (born 1830)
- Paul Peter Vilhelm Breder, politician (born 1816)
- Svend Adolph Solberg, politician (born 1831)
- Jacob Tostrup, goldsmith and jeweller (born 1806)
- Clara Ursin, actress and singer (born 1828)
