= 1882 in Norway =

- Centuries: 17th; 18th; 19th; 20th; 21st
- Decades: 1860s; 1870s; 1880s; 1890s; 1900s
- See also: 1882 in Sweden; List of years in Norway

Events in the year 1882 in Norway.

== Incumbents ==
- Monarch: Oscar II.
- Prime Minister: Christian August Selmer

== Events ==
- The 1882 Parliamentary election takes place.

== Births ==
=== January to June ===
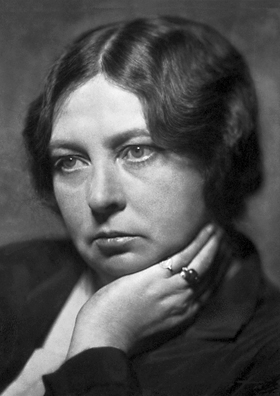
Sigrid Undset, Nobel Prize in literature laureate

- 6 January – Lise Stauri, educator (died 1949).
- 11 January – Ole Siem, naval officer, businessman, and politician (died 1979).
- 25 January – Conrad Christensen, gymnast and Olympic bronze medallist (d.1951)
- 4 February Birger Meidell, politician (d.1958)
- 5 February – Karl Ouren, Norwegian-American artist (d.1943)
- 19 February – Hans Ystgaard, politician and Minister (d.1953)
- 27 February – Nils Selmer Hauff, bookseller (d.1963)
- 11 March – Gunnar Kaasen, musher, delivered diphtheria antitoxin to Nome, Alaska in 1925, as the last leg of a dog sled relay that saved the city from an epidemic (d.1960)
- 12 March – Jakob Nilsson Vik, politician and Minister (d.1960)
- 2 May – Aagot Nissen, actress (d.1978)
- 5 May – Carl Alfred Pedersen, gymnast and triple jumper (d.1960)
- 20 May – Sigrid Undset, novelist, awarded the Nobel Prize in Literature in 1928 (d.1949)
- 10 June – Nils Økland, Esperantist and teacher
- 13 June – Hans Dons, naval officer and the first Norwegian to fly in Norway (d.1940)
- 25 June – Sigurd Asserson, civil servant (d.1937)
- 28 June – Peder Alsvik, politician (d.1964)
- 29 June – Ole Singstad, civil engineer in America (d.1969)

=== July to December ===
- 6 July – Arnstein Arneberg, architect (d.1961)
- 5 August – Trygve Schjøtt, sailor and Olympic gold medallist (d.1960)
- 13 August – Rolf Lefdahl, gymnast and Olympic silver medallist (d.1965)
- 20 August – Jens Isak de Lange Kobro, politician and Minister (d.1967)
- 25 August – Carl Fredrik Holmboe, engineer (d.1960)
- 30 August – Erling Kristvik, educator (died 1969).
- 12 September – Ragnvald Blix, illustrator (d.1958)
- 22 September – Emil Stang, jurist and politician (died 1964).
- 26 October – Per Bakken, Nordic skier (d.1958)
- 2 November – Oscar Engelstad, gymnast and Olympic bronze medallist (d.1972)
- 12 November – Nils Dahl, middle-distance runner (d.1966)
- 16 November – Nils Opdahl, gymnast and Olympic gold medallist (d.1951)
- 23 November – Hans Johan Jensen, politician
- 30 November – Frithjof Olsen, gymnast and Olympic silver medallist (d.1922)
- 16 December – Olav Bjørnstad, rower and Olympic bronze medallist (d.1963)
- 25 December – Fredrik Rosing Bull, inventor/designer of improved punched card machines (d.1925)

== Deaths ==
- 15 January – Aslak Reiersson Midhassel, politician (born 1798)
- 19 January – Rasmus Tønder Nissen, politician (born 1822)
- 22 March – Peter Wessel Wind Kildal, businessman (born 1814)
- 27 March – Jørgen Moe, bishop and author (born 1813)
- 10 April – Anton Wilhelm Brøgger, printer (born 1820)
- 27 June – Hans Paludan Smith Schreuder, missionary (born 1817)
- 28 September – Amunda Kolderup, opera singer (born 1846).
