= 1805 in Norway =

- Centuries: 17th; 18th; 19th; 20th; 21st
- Decades: 1780s; 1790s; 1800s; 1810s; 1820s
- See also: 1805 in Denmark; List of years in Norway

Events in the year 1805 in Norway.

== Incumbents ==
- Monarch: Christian VII.

== Events ==
- The 1,400 m (4,593 ft) long horse-powered Damtjern-Storflåtan railway in Krokskogen, was opened. It is believed to have been Norway's first railway.
- Burial inside churches was outlawed.

== Births ==
- 8 January – Halvor Heyerdahl Rasch, zoologist (d.1883)

=== Full date unknown ===
- Jørgen Wright Cappelen, bookseller and publisher (d.1878)
- Bernt Sverdrup Maschmann, priest and politician (d.1869)
- Ole Hersted Schjøtt, clergyman and politician (d.1848)
- Jacob Staalesen Velde, politician

== Deaths ==
- 21 April – Bernt Anker, merchant, chamberlain and playwright (born 1746).
- Eistein Kjørn, woodcarver (born 1727).
