= 1817 in Norway =

- Centuries: 17th; 18th; 19th; 20th; 21st
- Decades: 1790s; 1800s; 1810s; 1820s; 1830s
- See also: 1817 in Sweden; List of years in Norway

Events in the year 1817 in Norway.

== Incumbents ==
- Monarch: Charles II.

== Events ==
- The Miss Schultz School is founded. It was the first school for girls in Bergen, the biggest city in Norway in 1817.

== Births ==
- 9 January – Jacob Jørgen Kastrup Sømme, businessperson, consul and politician (d.1893)
- 2 June – Vilhelm Frimann Christie Bøgh, archivist (d.1888)
- 23 July – Johan Christian Collett, politician (d.1895)
- 8 August - Eilert Sundt, sociologist (d.1875)
- 9 September – Johan Collett Falsen, jurist and politician (d.1879)
- 14 October – Marcus Thrane, author, journalist, and the leader of the first labour movement in Norway (d.1890)
- 4 December – Hans Jensen, businessperson (d.1888)

=== Full date unknown ===
- Anders Bull, politician and Minister (d.1906)
- Magnus Feilberg, bookseller and publisher (d.1899)
- Ole Larsen Hammerstad, politician (d.1873)
- Adolph Frederik Munthe, politician and Minister (d.1884)
- Hilmar Martinus Strøm, politician
- Niels Petersen Vogt, politician and Minister (d.1894)
- Johannes Tørrissen Worum, politician

== Deaths ==
- 26 May - Peter Holm, government official and topographical writer (b.1733)
- 29 July - Johan Lausen Bull, jurist and politician (b.1751)
- 22 December - Peder Jørgen Cloumann, bailiff and representative at the Norwegian Constituent Assembly (b.1747)
