= 1878 in Norway =

- Centuries: 17th; 18th; 19th; 20th; 21st
- Decades: 1850s; 1860s; 1870s; 1880s; 1890s
- See also: 1878 in Sweden; List of years in Norway

Events in the year 1878 in Norway.

== Incumbents ==
- Monarch: Oscar II .
- Prime Minister: Frederik Stang

== Events ==
- A law is passed that requires teachers to speak the local dialect of their pupils and not the other way round.

== Births ==
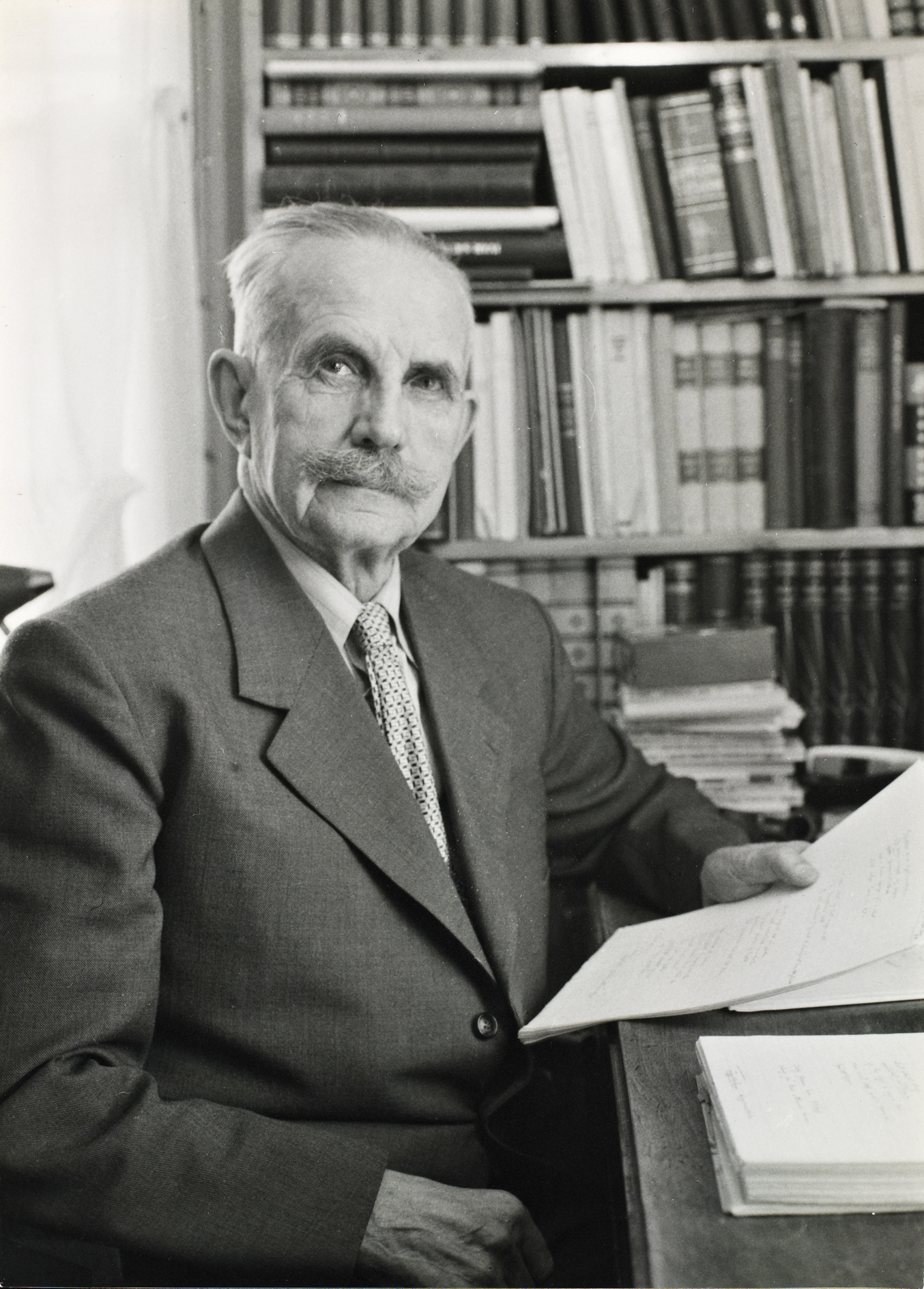
Kristofer Uppdal

- 13 January – Henrik Østervold, sailor and Olympic gold medallist (died 1957)
- 17 January – Olaf Husby, sport shooter
- 18 January – Gudmund Sundby, engineer (died 1973).
- 31 January – Marta Sandal, singer (died 1930)
- 1 February – Thoralf Glad, sailor and Olympic gold medallist (died 1969)
- 7 February – Lul Krag, painter (died 1956)
- 19 February – Kristofer Uppdal, poet and author (died 1961)
- 14 April – Karl Johan Pettersen Vadøy, politician (died 1965)
- 27 April – Christian Fredrik Monsen, politician (died 1954)
- 27 May – Arne Kavli, painter (died 1970).
- 18 July – Egill Reimers, architect, sailor and Olympic gold medallist (died 1946)
- 12 August – Østen Østensen, rifle shooter and Olympic silver medallist (died 1939)
- 7 November – Knut Markhus, educator and politician (died 1963).
- 28 November – Peder Kolstad, politician and Prime Minister of Norway (died 1932)

=== Full date unknown ===
- Per Berg Lund, politician and Minister (died 1954)
- Magnus Olsen, linguist and professor of Norse philology (died 1963)
- Anton Frederik Winter Jakhelln Prytz, politician (died 1945)

== Deaths ==
- 25 April – Nils Christian Irgens, military officer, politician and Minister (born 1811)
- 26 May - Gustav Adolph Lammers, priest, architect and artist (born 1802)
- 8 September – Ulrik Frederik Lange, politician (born 1808)

=== Full date unknown ===
- Jørgen Wright Cappelen, bookseller and publisher (born 1805)
- Johan Widing Heiberg Landmark, jurist and politician (born 1802)
- Peter Tidemand Malling, bookseller, printer and publisher (born 1807)
