= 1888 in Norway =

- Centuries: 17th; 18th; 19th; 20th; 21st
- Decades: 1860s; 1870s; 1880s; 1890s; 1900s
- See also: 1888 in Sweden; List of years in Norway

Events in the year 1888 in Norway.

== Incumbents ==
- Monarch – Oscar II.
- Prime Minister – Johan Sverdrup

== Events ==
- In the Norwegian parliamentary election the Conservative Party of Norway wins the most seats

== Notable births ==
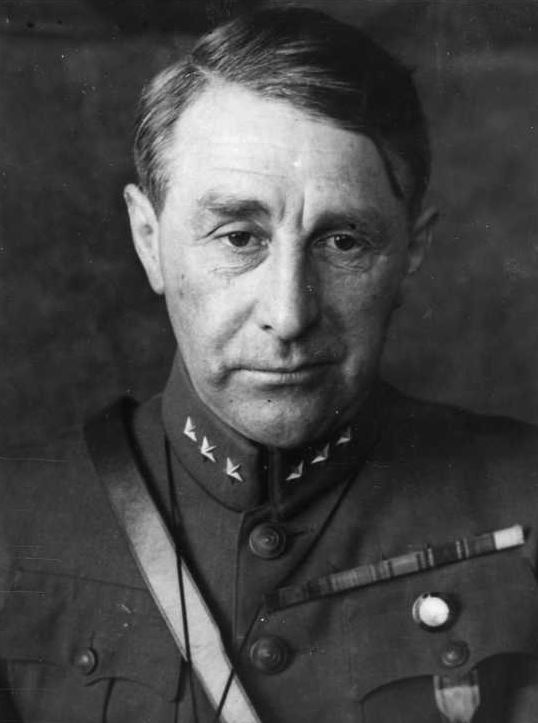
Knut Gysler

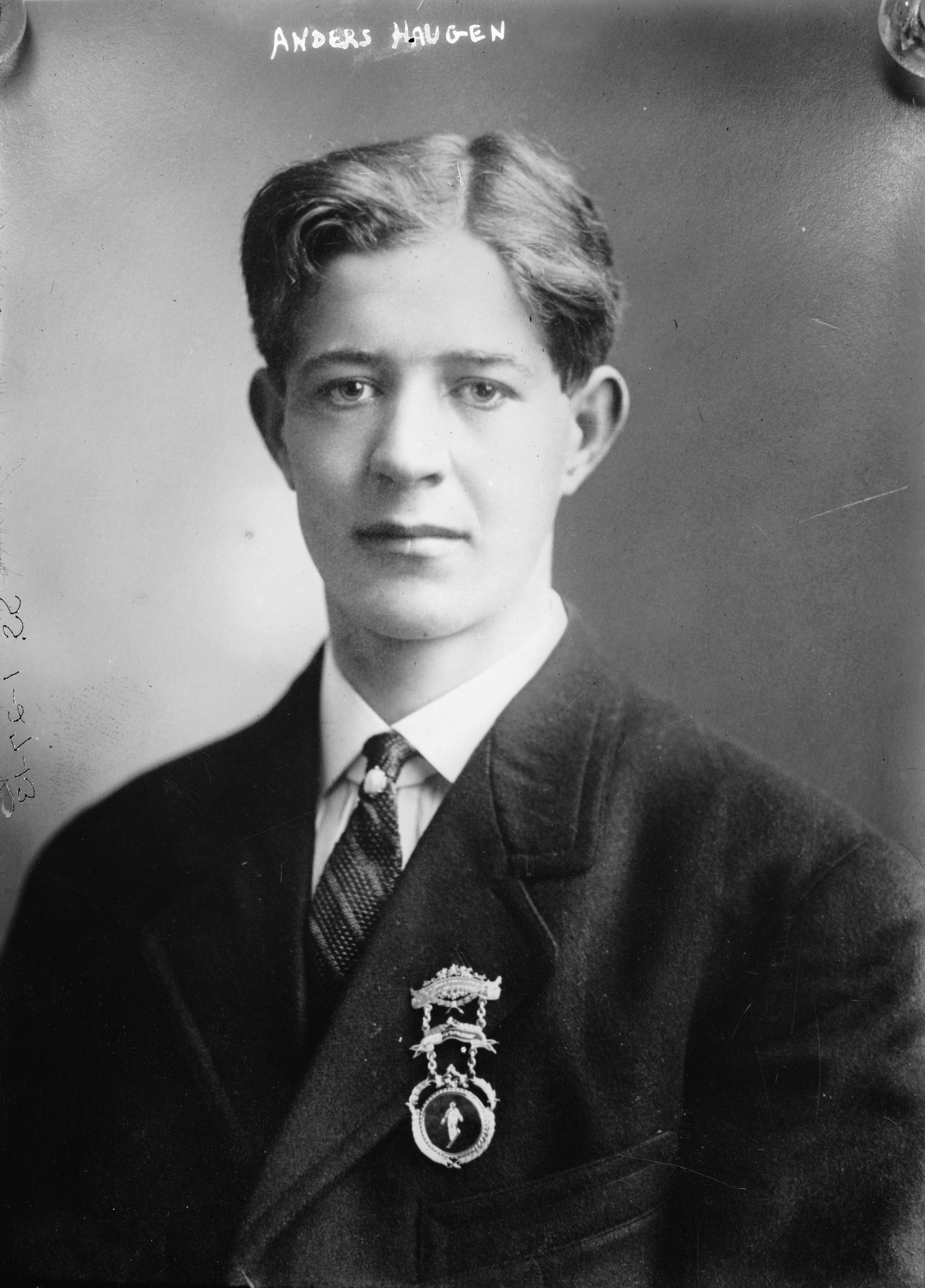
Anders Haugen

- 1 January – Kristian Albert Christiansen, politician (died 1966).
- 6 January – Thorry Kiær, industrialist (died 1968).
- 7 January – Thorstein Johansen, rifle shooter and Olympic gold medallist (died 1963)
- 12 January – Jon Andrå, politician (died 1966)
- 16 January – Harald Pedersen, metallurgist (died 1945).
- 20 January – Tor Lund, gymnast and Olympic gold medallist (died 1972)
- 4 February – Gunnar Nordbye, United States federal judge (died 1977)
- 16 February – Ferdinand Bie, long jumper and Olympic gold medallist (died 1961)
- 16 February – Aldor Ingebrigtsen, politician (died 1952)
- 21 February – Knut Gysler, equestrian (died 1967).
- 4 March – Knute Rockne, American football player and coach (died 1931)
- 5 March – Ivar Skjånes, politician (died 1975)
- 9 March – John Bjørnstad, rowing coxswain (died 1968).
- 24 March – Olof Jacobsen, gymnast and Olympic bronze medallist
- 28 March – Harald Smedvik, gymnast and Olympic silver medallist (died 1956)
- 2 April – Nicolai Kiær, gymnast and Olympic silver medallist (died 1934)
- 4 April – Aanund Bjørnsson Berdal, engineer (died 1981).
- 10 April – Alfred Madsen, engineer, newspaper editor, trade unionist and politician (died 1962)
- 12 April – Ejnar Tønsager, rower (died 1967)
- 14 April – Rasmus Birkeland, sailor and Olympic gold medallist (died 1972)
- 14 April – Edvard Christian Danielsen, military officer (died 1964).
- 10 May – Thore Michelsen, rower and Olympic bronze medallist (died 1980)
- 13 May – Peder Nikolai Leier Jacobsen, politician (died 1967)
- 27 May – Ole Aarnæs, high jumper (died 1992)
- 3 July – Harald Eriksen, gymnast and Olympic gold medallist (died 1968)
- 30 July – Wilhelm Keilhau, historian and economist (died 1954).
- 23 August – Ivar Asbjørn Følling, physician (died 1973)
- 1 September – Gabriel Thorstensen, gymnast and Olympic gold medallist (died 1974)
- 29 September – Johannes Andersen, long-distance runner (died 1967)
- 4 October – Oscar Mathisen, speed skater (died 1954)
- 15 October – Leif Erichsen, sailor and Olympic silver medallist (died 1924)
- 16 October – Ivar Kristiansen Hognestad, politician (died 1973)
- 24 October – Anders Haugen, ski jumper (died 1984).
- 15 November – Harald Sverdrup, oceanographer and meteorologist (died 1957)
- 25 November – Amund Rydland, actor and theatre director (died 1967).

=== Full date unknown ===
- Torgeir Anderssen-Rysst, politician and Minister (died 1958)
- Sverre Grette, judge (died 1959)
- Lars Høgvold, ski jumper (died 1961)
- Jørg Tofte Jebsen, physicist (died 1922)
- Per Mathias Jespersen, gymnast and Olympic silver medallist
- Gustav Smedal, jurist and irredentist activist (died 1951)

== Notable deaths ==
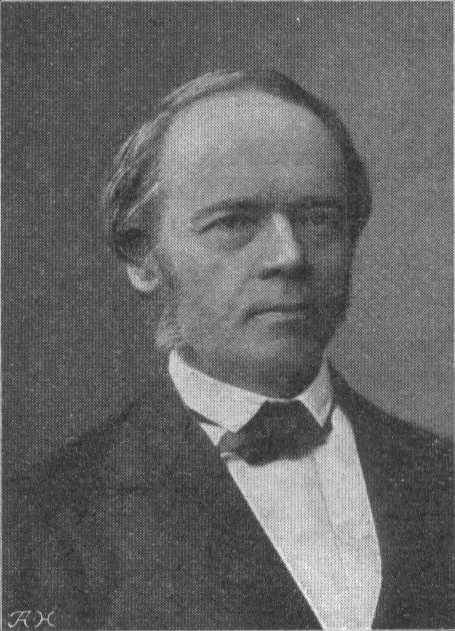
Ole Richter

- 9 January – Theodor Peterson, businessperson and politician (born 1839)
- 17 June – Hans Jensen, businessperson (born 1817)
- 22 June – Edmund Neupert, pianist and composer (born 1842)
- 1 July – Vilhelm Frimann Christie Bøgh, archivist (born 1817)
- 25 October – Theodor Kjerulf, geologist and poet (born 1825)

=== Full date unknown ===
- Erik Eriksen, ice sea captain (born 1820)
- Nicolai Friis, politician (born 1815)
- Christen Knudsen, ship-owner (born 1813)
- Ole Richter, lawyer, politician and Prime Minister of Norway (born 1829)
- Sjur Aasmundsen Sexe, mineralogist (born 1808)
