= 1813 in Norway =

- Centuries: 17th; 18th; 19th; 20th; 21st
- Decades: 1790s; 1800s; 1810s; 1820s; 1830s
- See also: 1813 in Denmark; List of years in Norway

Events in the year 1813 in Norway.

== Incumbents ==
- Monarch: Frederick VI .

== Events ==
- 5 January - Denmark-Norway declared bankruptcy and a new state bank, the Rigsbank, was created.
- 1 May - Christian Frederick is appointed Steward of Norway.
- 2 October - The Norwegian Students' Society was established.

== Arts and literature ==
- The Norwegian journal Historisk-philosophiske Samlinger (Historical-Philosophical Collections) final issue was published.

== Births ==
- 23 January – Camilla Collett, writer and feminist (d.1895)
- 18 February – Harald Ulrik Sverdrup, priest and politician (d.1891)
- 5 August – Ivar Aasen, philologist, lexicographer, playwright and poet (d.1896)
- 19 November – Augusta Smith, actor and opera singer (d.1900)

=== Full date unknown ===
- Christen Knudsen, ship-owner (d.1888)
- Jørgen Moe, bishop and author (d.1882)
- Christian Tønsberg, bookseller, publisher and writer (d.1897)

== Deaths ==
- 12 August – Matz Jenssen, businessperson (b.1760)
