= 1815 in Norway =

- Centuries: 17th; 18th; 19th; 20th; 21st
- Decades: 1790s; 1800s; 1810s; 1820s; 1830s
- See also: 1815 in Sweden; List of years in Norway

Events in the year 1815 in Norway.

== Incumbents ==
- Monarch: Charles II.

== Events ==
- 31 July - The 1815 Act of Union was passed by the Storting.
- 30 April – Population Census: Norway had 885,431 inhabitants.
- The Supreme Court of Norway was established on the basis of the Constitution of Norway's §88, prescribing an independent judiciary.

== Births ==
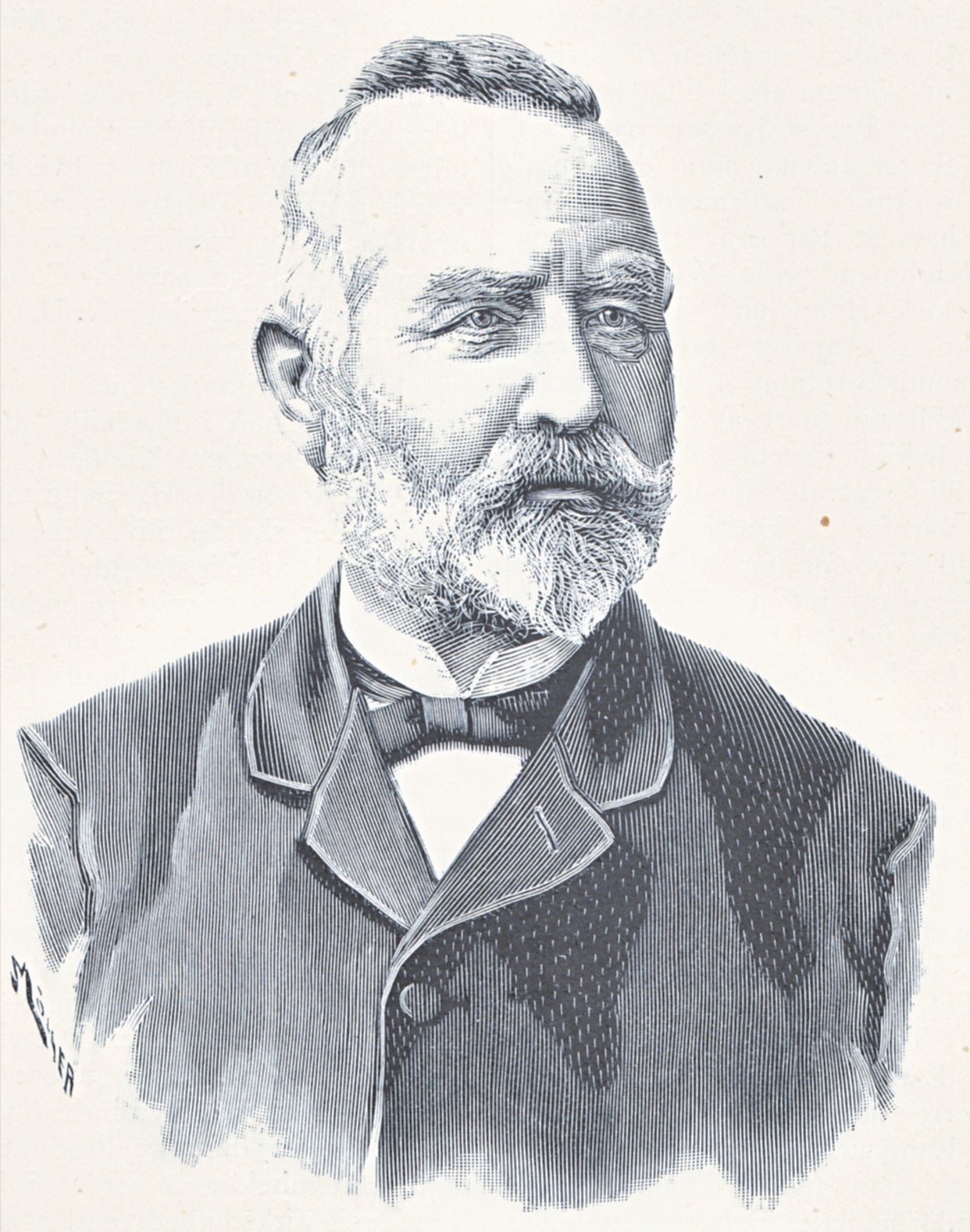
Mads Langaard

- 19 February – Elise Wærenskjold, Norwegian-American pioneer in Texas (d. 1895)
- 25 March – Johan Henrik Andresen, merchant, factory owner and politician (died 1874).
- 4 April – Johannes Wilhelm Christian Dietrichson, Lutheran Minister (d. 1883)
- 3 May – Mads Langaard, brewery owner and industrialist (d.1891).
- 4 July – Daniel Cornelius Danielssen, physician (d.1894)
- 23 July – Johan Christian Johnsen, politician (d.1898)
- 30 July – Herman Severin Løvenskiold, composer (d.1870)
- 15 September – Halfdan Kjerulf, composer (d.1868)

=== Full date unknown ===
- Nicolai Friis, politician (d.1888)
- Hans Peder Johansen Hafslund, politician
- Thomas Henrik Hammer, jurist and politician (d.1900)
- Hans Gerhard Colbjørnsen Meldahl, jurist and politician (d.1877)
- Joseph Frantz Oscar Wergeland, military officer, cartographer and skiing pioneer (d.1895)

== Deaths ==
- 20 February - Maren Juel, landowner (b.1749)
- 9 December - Catharina Lysholm, businesswoman and ship-owner (b.1744)
