= 1884 in Norway =

- Centuries: 17th; 18th; 19th; 20th; 21st
- Decades: 1860s; 1870s; 1880s; 1890s; 1900s
- See also: 1884 in Sweden; List of years in Norway

Events in the year 1884 in Norway.

== Incumbents ==
- Monarch: Oscar II.
- Prime Minister: Christian August Selmer (impeached)
- Prime Minister: Christian Homann Schweigaard (April to June)
- Prime Minister: Johan Sverdrup

== Events ==
- Prime Minister Christian August Selmer is impeached and removed from office.
- 28 January – The Liberal Party is founded.
- 10 February – Jon Hol is imprisoned for his pamphlet Rifleringen.
- 3 April – April ministerium begins.
- 26 June – Christian Homann Schweigaard's ministerium ends.
- Norwegian Association for Women's Rights (Norsk Kvinnesaksforening) is founded.
- Women in Norway are allowed to study.

== Arts and literature ==
- The Wild Duck by Henrik Ibsen is written.

== Births ==
=== January to June ===
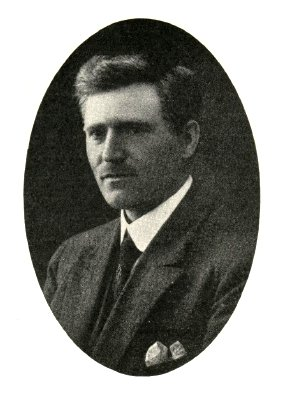
Anton Aure

- 8 January – Nils Andresson Lavik, politician (died 1966)
- 9 January – Sigge Johannessen, gymnast and Olympic silver medallist (died 1974)
- 15 January – Anton Aure, bibliographer (died 1924).
- 24 January – Jens Lunde, politician (died 1974)
- 9 February – Conrad Carlsrud, gymnast, track and field athlete and Olympic silver medallist (died 1973)
- 13 February – Halfdan Bjølgerud, high jumper (died 1970)
- 21 February – Ole Iversen, gymnast and Olympic silver medallist (died 1953)
- 29 February – Haakon Lie, forester and writer (died 1970).
- 27 March – Oscar Guttormsen, athlete (died 1964)
- 31 March – Arne Magnussen, politician
- 26 April – Sigurd Mathisen, speed skater and world champion (died 1919)
- 7 June – Birger Ljungberg, politician (died 1967)

=== July to September ===
- 6 July – Thorleif Petersen, gymnast and Olympic gold medallist (died 1958)
- 10 July – Olav Nygard, poet (died 1924)
- 26 July – Trygve Pedersen, sailor and Olympic bronze medallist (died 1967)
- 31 July – Kristian Løken, military officer (died 1961)
- 23 August – Olaf Syvertsen, gymnast and Olympic silver medallist (died 1964)
- 31 August – Didrik Arup Seip, linguist and professor (died 1963)
- 6 September – Sven Elvestad, journalist and author (died 1934)
- 16 September – Kristian Fjerdingen, gymnast and Olympic gold medallist (died 1975)

=== October to December ===
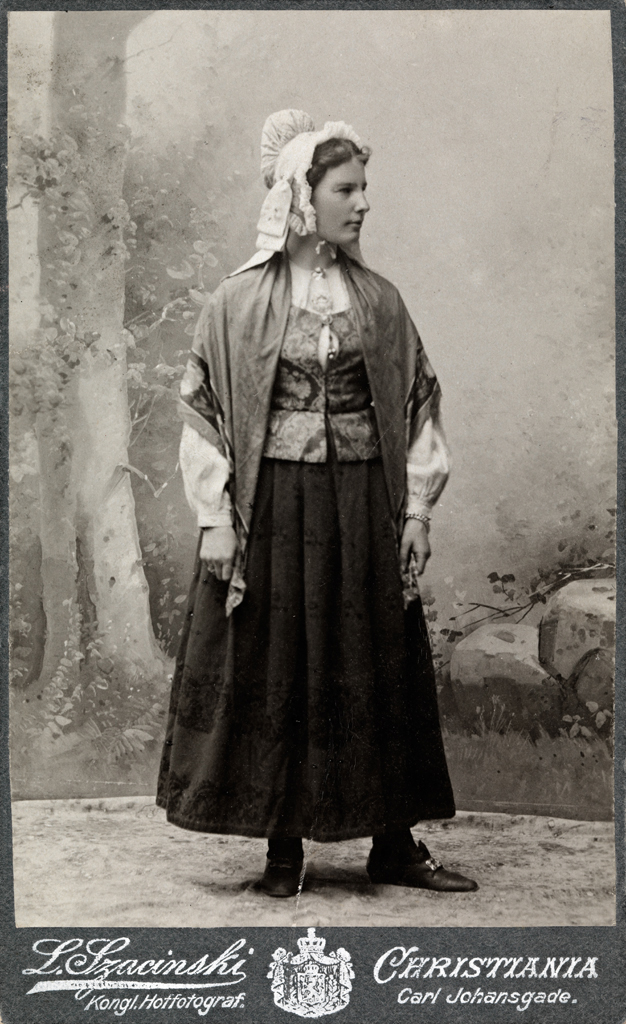
Klara Semb

- 17 October – Klara Semb, folklorist (died 1970).
- 18 October – Esther Edler, actress (died 1908).
- 25 October – Eivind Berggrav, Lutheran bishop (died 1959)
- 12 November – Leif Grøner, banker and politician (died 1971)
- 13 December – Otto Olsen, rifle shooter and Olympic gold medallist (died 1953)
- 18 December – Ole Aanderud Larsen, ship designer and businessperson (died 1964)
- 30 December – Eugen Ingebretsen, gymnast and Olympic gold medallist (died 1949)

=== Full date unknown ===
- Gustav Berg-Jæger, journalist and Nazi collaborator (died 1957)
- Lars Christensen, shipowner and whaling magnate (died 1965)
- Sigurd Eriksen, painter (died 1976)
- Adolf Indrebø, politician (died 1942)
- Lars Knutsen, shipowner (died 1963)
- Arnold Rørholt, military officer (died 1961)

== Deaths ==
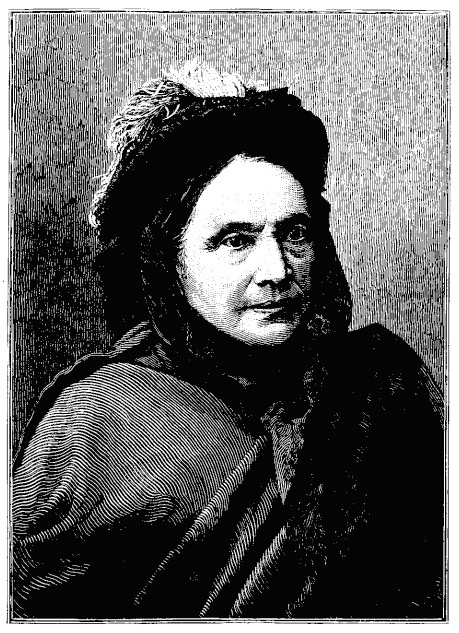
Marie Colban

- 27 February – Jo Gjende, outdoorsman and freethinker (born 1794)
- 27 March – Marie Colban, writer (born 1814).
- 3 September – Christian Jensen, politician and Minister (born 1823)

=== Full date unknown ===
- Adolph Frederik Munthe, politician and Minister (born 1817)
- Ole Hovelsen Mustad, businessperson and politician (born 1810)
- Frederik Stang, lawyer, public servant and politician, Norway's first Prime Minister (born 1808)
