= Anzjøn =

Anzjøn is a Norwegian surname. Notable people with the surname include:

- Line Anzjøn (born 1975), Norwegian footballer
- Peder Paulsen Anzjøn (1806–1890), Norwegian politician
- Stein Anzjøn (born 1958), Norwegian archer
