= 1880 in Norway =

- Centuries: 17th; 18th; 19th; 20th; 21st
- Decades: 1860s; 1870s; 1880s; 1890s; 1900s
- See also: 1880 in Sweden; List of years in Norway

Events in the year 1880 in Norway.

== Incumbents ==
- Monarch: Oscar II .
- Prime Minister: Christian August Selmer

== Births ==
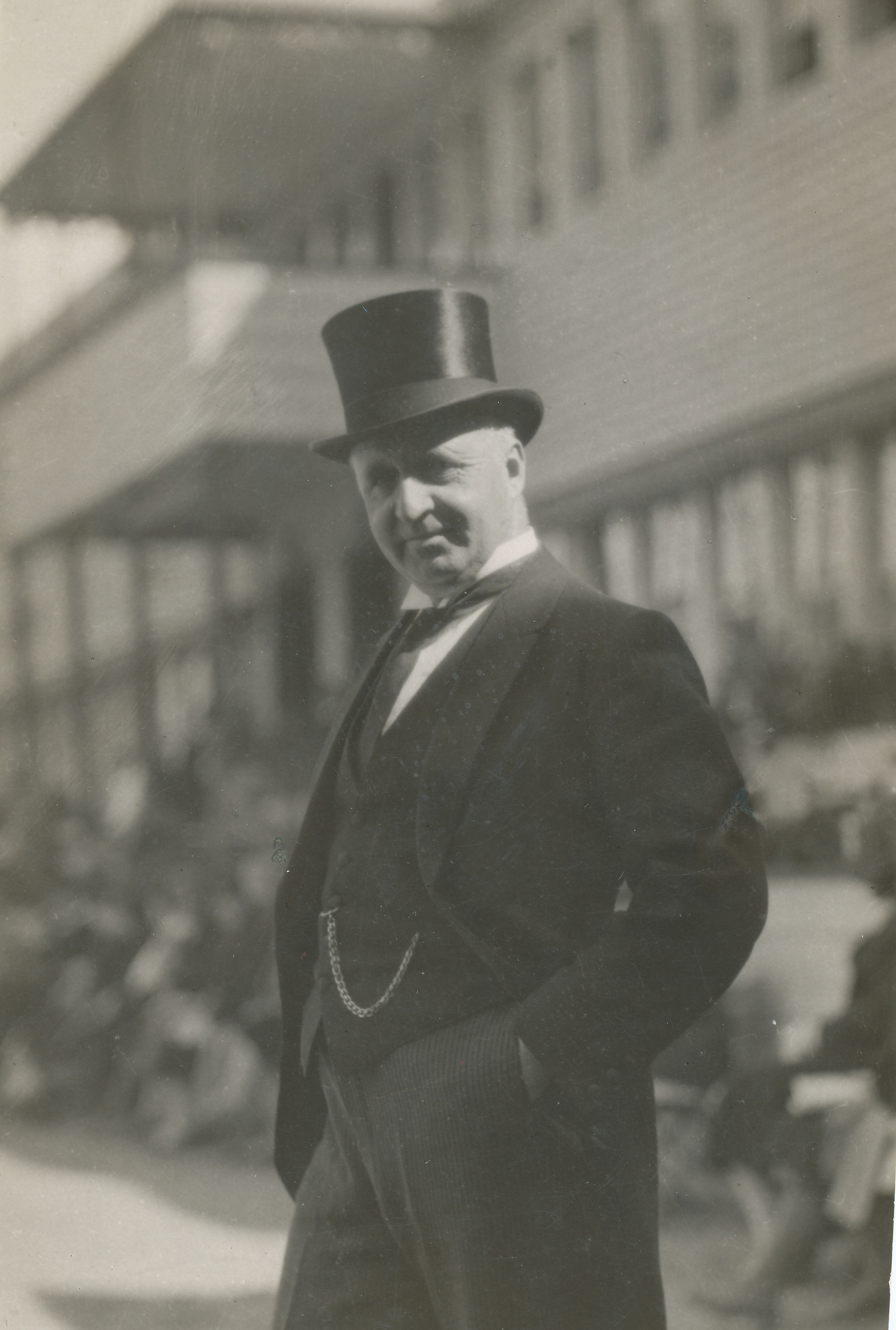
Olav Bergersen

=== January to June ===
- 2 February – Arnt Ferdinand Moss, accountant and politician.
- 20 March – Oscar Ludvig Larsen, politician
- 13 April – Alfred Vågnes, politician (died 1970)
- 29 April – Anders Krogvig, librarian, writer, literary consultant and critic (died 1924)
- 29 April – Jonas Lie, artist (died 1940 in America)
- 18 May – Thomas Thorstensen, gymnast and Olympic gold medallist (died 1953)
- 16 June – Joachim Holst-Jensen, film actor (died 1963)

=== July to December ===
- 2 July – Olav Bergersen, naval officer and politician (d. 1973).
- 1 August – Hans Nordvik, rifle shooter and Olympic gold medallist (died 1960)
- 30 August – Nikolai Astrup, painter (died 1928)
- 28 September – Jon Jørundson Mannsåker, priest and politician (died 1964)
- 7 October – Johan Undrum, politician (d. 1940).
- 8 December – Per Lysne, Rosemaling artist (died 1947)
- 30 December – Svend Evensen, judge.

=== Full date unknown ===
- Nils Christoffer Bøckman, military officer and businessperson (died 1973)
- Haakon Martin Five, politician and Minister (died 1944)
- Knut Gunnarsson Helland, Hardanger fiddle maker (died 1920)
- Jens Holmboe, botanist (died 1943)

== Deaths ==
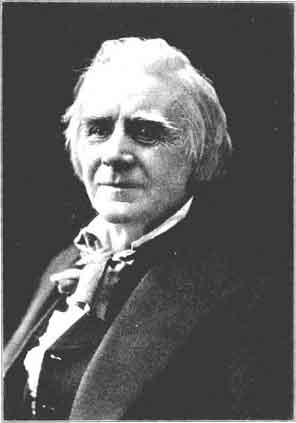
Ole Bull

- 15 February – Carl Roosen, cartographer and military officer (born 1800)
- 9 July – Jens Landmark, military officer and politician (born 1811)
- 17 August – Ole Bull, violinist (born 1810
- 8 October – Magnus Brostrup Landstad, minister, psalmist and poet (born 1802)

=== Full date unknown ===
- Knut Eriksson Helland, Hardanger fiddle maker (born 1851)
