= 1879 in Norway =

- Centuries: 17th; 18th; 19th; 20th; 21st
- Decades: 1850s; 1860s; 1870s; 1880s; 1890s
- See also: 1879 in Sweden; List of years in Norway

Events in the year 1879 in Norway.

== Incumbents ==
- Monarch: Oscar II .
- Prime Minister: Frederik Stang

== Events ==
- The Kverneland Group was established by Ole Gabriel Kverneland.

== Arts and literature ==
- Henrik Ibsen (while living in Italy) publishes A Doll's House

== Births ==
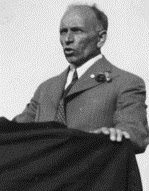
Martin Tranmæl

=== January to June ===
- 26 January – Birger Braadland, politician (died 1966)
- 6 February – Haavard Martinsen, chemist and industrial leader (died 1967).
- 5 March – Rachel Grepp, journalist and politician (died 1961)
- 24 March – Leiv Heggstad, educator, linguist and translator (died 1954).
- 11 April – Øistein Schirmer, gymnast and Olympic gold medallist (died 1947)
- 29 April – Henrik Ameln, jurist and politician (died 1961)
- 23 May – Kjeld Stub Irgens, sea captain and collaborator minister (died 1963)
- 27 May – Per Reidarson, composer and music critic (died 1954)
- 28 May – Lilly Heber, literary critic and historian (died 1944).
- 30 May – Olaf Josef Johansen, politician.
- 27 June – Martin Tranmæl, socialist leader (died 1967)

=== July to September ===
- 9 July – Karen Platou, politician (died 1950)
- 31 July – Cally Monrad, singer and actress (died 1950).
- 5 August – Ole Hallesby, Lutheran neo-orthodox pietist (died 1961)
- 6 August – Kyrre Grepp, politician (died 1922)
- 6 September
  - Knud Leonard Knudsen, gymnast and Olympic gold medallist (died 1954)
  - Johan Nygaardsvold, politician and Prime Minister of Norway (died 1952)
- 14 September – Andreas Brecke, sailor and Olympic gold medallist (died 1952)
- 29 September – Nils Bertelsen, sailor and Olympic gold medallist (died 1958)
- 30 September – Johan Falkberget, author (died 1967)

=== October to December ===
- 1 October – Lauritz Sand, resistance fighter (died 1956)
- 5 October – Halfdan Cleve, composer (died 1951)
- 21 October – Torkell Vinje, politician (died 1955)
- 20 November – Martin Stenersen, sport shooter (died 1968)
- 27 November – Gil Andersen, American auto racer (died 1930)
- 29 November – Nils Trædal, cleric, politician and Minister (died 1948)
- 6 December – Rudolf Gundersen, speed skater (died 1946)

=== Full date unknown ===
- Anders Fjelstad, politician (died 1955)

== Deaths ==
- 5 February – Halvor Schou, industrialist (born 1823)
- 8 April – Christian Cornelius Paus, lawyer, civil servant and politician (born 1800)
- 2 September – Johan Collett Falsen, jurist and politician (born 1817)

=== Full date unknown ===
- Jan Henrik Nitter Hansen, businessman and politician (born 1801)
- Henrik Krohn, poet, magazine editor and proponent for Nynorsk language (born 1826)
