= 1883 in Norway =

- Centuries: 17th; 18th; 19th; 20th; 21st
- Decades: 1860s; 1870s; 1880s; 1890s; 1900s
- See also: 1883 in Sweden; List of years in Norway

Events in the year 1883 in Norway.

== Incumbents ==
- Monarch: Oscar II .
- Prime Minister: Christian August Selmer

== Arts and literature ==
- The novel Bondestudentar (English: Peasant students), written by Arne Garborg, is published.

== Births ==
=== January to March ===
- 10 January – Kristian Arvesen, farmer and politician
- 21 January – Olav Aukrust, poet and teacher (died 1929)
- 27 January – Hans Ingvald Hansen Ratvik, politician (died 1966)
- 10 February – Gunnar Jahn, jurist, economist and politician (died 1971)
- 26 February – John Johansen, sprinter (died 1947)
- 21 February – Haldor Andreas Haldorsen, politician (died 1965)
- 16 March – Olaf Nordhagen, architect, engineer and artist (died 1925)
- 18 March – Sven Nielsen, politician (died 1958)

=== April to June ===
- 4 April – Agnes Hvoslef, operatic soprano (died 1970).
- 8 April – Olav Midttun, philologist, media executive and magazine editor (died 1972).
- 19 April – Jørgen Stubberud, polar explorer (died 1980)
- 27 April – Jakob Friis, politician (died 1956)
- 27 April – Ole Lilloe-Olsen, rifle shooter and Olympic gold medallist (died 1940)
- 29 April – Thorleif Holbye, sailor and Olympic gold medallist (died 1963)
- 6 May – Jens Hundseid, politician (died 1965)

=== July to September ===
- 9 July – Bergljot Larsson, nurse and organizational leader (died 1968).
- 11 July – Hans Svarstad, politician (died 1971)
- 22 July – Birger Gotaas, journalist (died 1960).
- 8 August – Kristoffer Olsen, sailor and Olympic gold medallist (died 1948)
- 8 September – Jens Salvesen, sailor and Olympic silver medallist (died 1976)
- 22 September – Ole Sørensen, sailor and Olympic gold medallist (died 1958)

=== October to December ===
- 5 October – Niels Nielsen, sailor and Olympic silver medallist (died 1961)
- 11 October – Kristian Welhaven, chief of the Oslo police force 1927–1954 (died 1975)
- 16 October – Halfdan Hansen, sailor and Olympic gold medallist (died 1953)
- 20 October – Wilhelm Munthe, librarian (died 1965).
- 10 November – Olaf Bull, poet (died 1933)
- 11 November – Karl Johan Edvardsen, politician (died 1963)
- 14 November – Paal Kaasen, sailor and Olympic gold medallist (died 1963)
- 18 November – Alf Bjørnskau Bastiansen, priest and politician (died 1965)
- 6 December – Arne Sunde, politician, Olympic shooter, army officer and diplomat (died 1972)
- 16 December – Haldor Bjerkeseth, politician (died 1974)

=== Full date unknown ===
- Anton Ludvig Alvestad, politician and Minister (died 1956)
- Edvard Drabløs, actor and theatre director (died 1976)
- Alfred Evensen, musician (died 1942)
- Olav Scheflo, politician and journalist (died 1943)
- Jon Sundby, politician and Minister (died 1972)

== Deaths ==
- 10 January – Elling Eielsen, minister and Lutheran Church leader in America (born 1804)
- 26 August – Halvor Heyerdahl Rasch, zoologist (born 1805)
- 14 November – Johannes Wilhelm Christian Dietrichson minister and Lutheran Church leader (born 1815)

=== Full date unknown ===
- Peder Krabbe Gaarder, jurist and political theorist (born 1814)
