= Karl Vadøy =

Norwegian politician

Karl Vadøy

Karl Johan Pettersen Vadøy (13 April 1878 - 16 October 1965) was a Norwegian politician for the Liberal Party.

He served as a deputy representative to the Norwegian Parliament from Sogn og Fjordane during the terms 1934–1936, 1937–1945 and 1945–1949. He was also chairman of Norges Sildesalgslag 1936–1950.
