= Bersvend Martinussen Røkkum =

Norwegian politician

Bersvend Martinussen Røkkum (2 February 1806 – 14 August 1867) was a Norwegian politician.

He was elected to the Norwegian Parliament in 1842, representing the rural constituency of Romsdals Amt (today named Møre og Romsdal). He worked as a farmer. He served only one term.

He was born and died in Ålvundfjord.
