= Harald Færstad =

Norwegian gymnast

- Full name: Harald Oliver Nikolai Færstad
- Born: 2 December 1889 Bergen, United Kingdoms of Sweden and Norway
- Died: 10 July 1979 (aged 89) Bergen, Norway

Gymnastics career
- Discipline: Men's artistic gymnastics
- Country represented: Norway
- Club: IK Viking
Medal record
Men's artistic gymnastics
Representing Norway
Olympic Games
Silver medal – second place	1920 Antwerp	Team, free system

Harald Oliver Nikolai Færstad (2 December 1889 – 10 July 1979) was a Norwegian gymnast who competed in the 1920 Summer Olympics. He was part of the Norwegian team, which won the gold medal in the gymnastics men's team, free system event.
