= Kristian Geelmuyden =

Norwegian politician

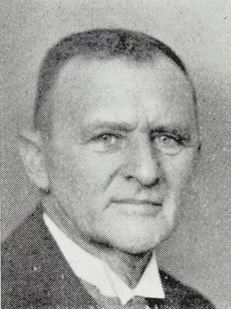
Kristian in a photo from before 1933.

Kristian Geelmuyden (12 November 1875 in Kristiania – ?) was a Norwegian politician for the Conservative Party and mayor of Bærum from 1935 to 1937. He spent much of his apolitical career in Norsk Hydro, including as chief of department and director in Oslo from 1915 to 1926. He was a reserve officer in the Norwegian Army, with the rank of First Lieutenant.

Preceded by Ole Stamnæs	Mayor of Bærum; 1935–1937	Succeeded by Thv. Bjølgerud
