= Torbjørg Utne =

Norwegian hotelier

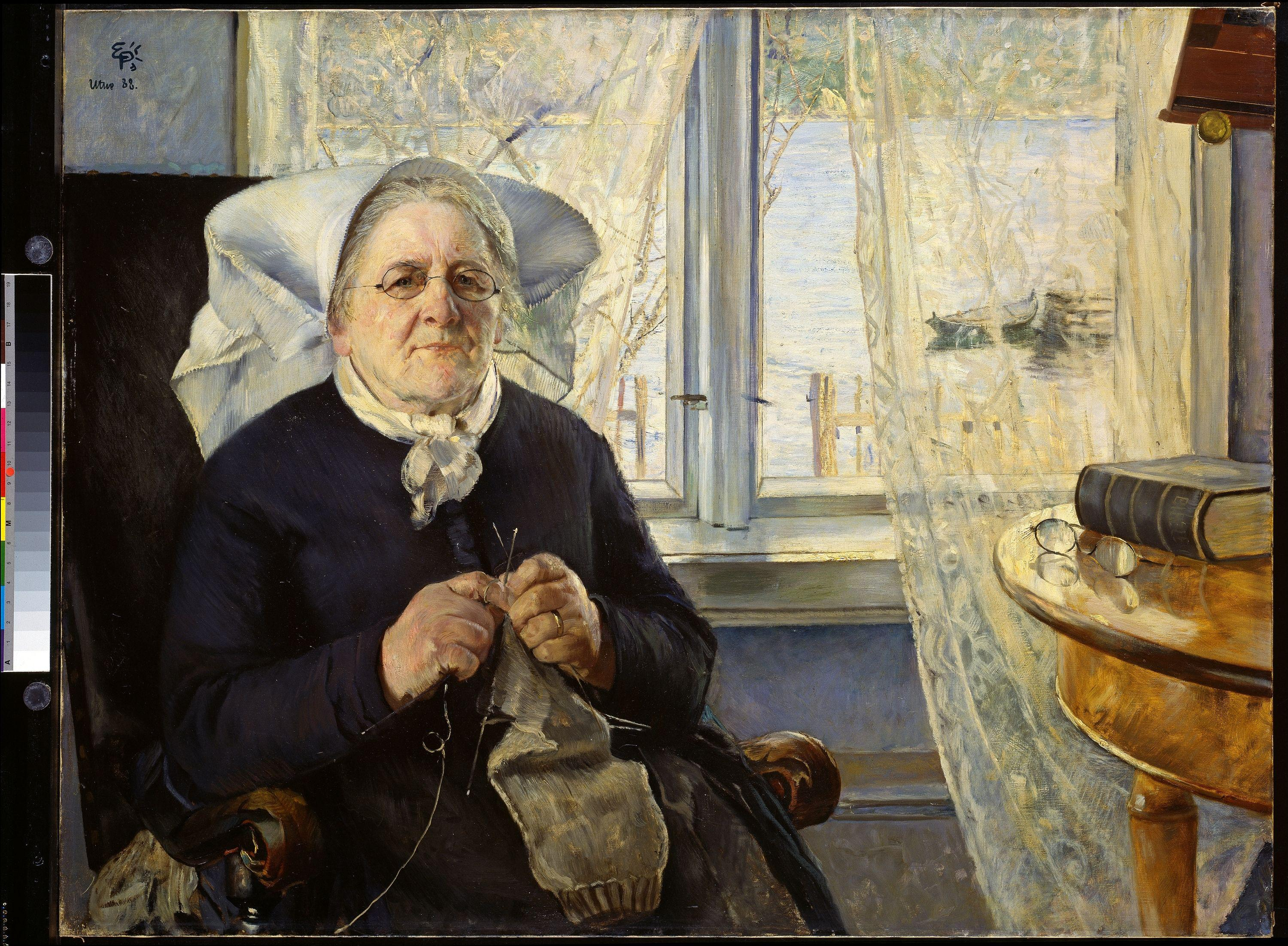
- Torbjørg Utne portrayed by Eilif Peterssen
- Born: 1812; Utne, Norway
- Died: 22 June 1903 (aged 90–91); Utne
- Occupation: Hotelier

Torbjørg Utne (1812 – 22 May 1903) was a Norwegian hotelier.

== Personal life ==
Torbjørg Johannesdatter Utne was born in Utne in 1812, a daughter of farmer Johannes Lutro and Torbjørg Helland. She married merchant and hotelier Johan Winess Utne in 1832.

== Career ==
Serving as hostess at the Hotel Utne in Utne, Hardanger for 70 years, Torbjørg Utne got legendary status, nicknamed Mor Utne. The hotel became a gathering point for scientists from Norway and other countries, and eventually for tourists.

Her portrait, painted by Eilif Peterssen in 1888, is located at the National Museum of Norway.

Torbjørg Utne died in Utne on 22 June 1909.
