= Jacob Staalesen Velde =

Norwegian politician

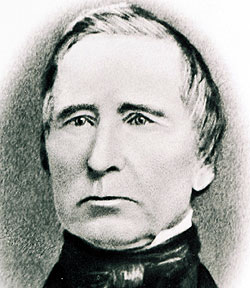
Jacob Velde (1805–1877), mayor and Member of Parliament from Beitstad.

Jacob Staalesen Velde (18 April 1805 – 14 July 1877) was a Norwegian politician.

He was elected to the Norwegian Parliament in 1848, representing the constituency of Nordre Trondhjems Amt. He worked as a teacher and farmer there. He was re-elected in 1851, 1854, 1868 and 1871.
