= Hans Jensen Krog =

Norwegian politician

Hans Jensen Krog (27 December 1808 – 22 February 1897) was a Norwegian politician.

He was elected to the Norwegian Parliament in 1859, representing the constituency of Søndre Bergenhuus Amt. He worked as a vicar (sogneprest) there. He was re-elected for a second term in 1862.
