= Jørres Schelderup Hansen =

Norwegian politician

Jørres Schelderup Hansen (13 April 1811 - 21 December 1870) was a Norwegian politician.

He was elected to the Norwegian Parliament in 1857, representing the constituency of Tromsø og Finmarkens Amt. He worked as a vicar (sogneprest) there. He was re-elected for a second term in 1862.
