= Herman Helgesen =

Norwegian artistic gymnast

- Full name: Herman Alrich Frostrup Helgesen
- Born: 28 February 1889 Ålesund, United Kingdoms of Sweden and Norway
- Died: 1 February 1963 (aged 73) Ålesund, Norway

Gymnastics career
- Discipline: Men's artistic gymnastics
- Country represented: Norway
- Gym: Aalesunds Turnforening
Medal record
Men's artistic gymnastics
Representing Norway
Olympic Games
Silver medal – second place	1920 Antwerp	Team, free system

Herman Alrich Frostrup Helgesen (28 February 1889 – 1 February 1963) was a Norwegian gymnast who competed in the 1920 Summer Olympics. He was part of the Norwegian team, which won the silver medal in the gymnastics men's team, free system event.
