= Ola Antonson Holsen =

Norwegian politician

Ola Antonson Holsen (1808–1864) was a Norwegian politician.

Originally a farmer and school teacher in Holsen, he was elected as a member of the municipal council of Førde Municipality from 1839 to 1859. He was also elected to the Norwegian Parliament in 1845, 1848, 1851 and 1854.
