= Frøken Schultz's Skole =

School in Bergen, Norway

Miss Schultz's School Norwegian: Frøken Schultz's Skole

Location
- Bergen; Norway

Information
- Established: 1817
- Closed: 1913
- Gender: Girls

Frøken Schultz's Skole ('Miss Schultz's School') was a girls' school in Bergen, Norway, that operated from 1817 to 1913. It was the first school for girls in Bergen, which was the largest city in Norway at the time. Although several more schools for girls were subsequently established, it continuously maintained a reputation as one of the most important schools for girls in Bergen.

== History ==
The school was founded by Agathe Schultz (also spelled Scholtz and Scholz). Before it was founded, girls in Bergen could be schooled in the first grades only in the clerical grammar schools, in the pauper schools, or by privately hired teachers in their homes. As Bergen was the biggest city in Norway, the school managed to flourish and continued to do so even when successful rival schools were founded beginning in the 1840s.

The school was initially typical of girls' pensions at the time, giving lessons in German, French, and other skills that were considered appropriate for females at the time. Like other schools of its kind, it gradually adapted to meet evolving social expectations for girls’ education. In 1885, it was formally converted into a serious five-level secondary educational school.

Founder Agathe Scholtz was the school’s first manager, followed by "the Misses Irgens", then by "Mrs. Reusch" (1850–1875), R. Hille (1875–1885), and (Sofie Irgens Grieg (1885-?). As was customary then, the school was always called by the name of its current manager.
