= Battle of Grimstad Bay =

1811 amphibious battle of the Napoleonic Wars

- Part of the Napoleonic Wars and the Gunboat War
- The British row into Grimstad (blue line), seize the Frau Maria as a prize, and take it into Vikkilen (red line). The map marks where Grimstad citizens positioned their small cannons on the wharves within the town, as well as the cannon carried out to Biodden. Detail from Grimstad’s first town map, drawn in 1847.
Date	16 March 1811
Location	Grimstad, Norway 58°21′00.2″N 8°36′26.9″E
Result	Norwegian victory

Belligerents
Denmark–Norway	United Kingdom

Strength
Unknown amount of Norwegian volunteers	1 frigate

Casualties and losses
Unknown	Several killed or wounded

The Battle of Grimstad Bay (Norwegian: Bataljen på Grimstad havn) was an amphibious assault by the United Kingdom against Denmark–Norway that took place in the town of Grimstad, situated on the southern coast of present-day Norway. The battle was a part of the blockade that the Royal Navy maintained on the country from 1807 to 1814 during the Napoleonic Wars.

== Course ==
HMS Venus was in pursuit of four Norwegian merchant vessels that had sought refuge in the fjord leading to Grimstad. Among these vessels was the sloop Frau Maria, which was en-route from Bergen to Flensburg carrying fish, salt, and cod liver oil.

Map depicting the canal between Vikkilen and Roresanden

Venus anchored outside the outer islands of Grimstad and deployed three small boats manned by Royal Marines. These boats made their way into Grimstad bay and boarded Frau Maria. Norwegian forces in Grimstad mobilized and engaged the British-controlled sloop using rifles and a few small cannons. Despite their efforts, the marines managed to set sail on Frau Maria but inadvertently sailed her into a narrow bay with no passage leading to the ocean. They were trapped and were forced to abandon the ship and retreated back to Venus. It was reported that several marines were killed or wounded in the engagement.
