= Hans Peder Johansen Hafslund =

Norwegian politician

Hans Peder Johansen Hafslund (born Larsen; 29 November 1815 – 19 February 1867) was a Norwegian politician.

He was born in Hafslund, Snarvagten, Skjeberg (a district of Sarpsborg), to Johan Larsen and Marie Kirstine Hansdatter. He later assumed the surname Hafslund.

He was elected to the Norwegian Parliament in 1859, representing the constituency of Sarpsborg. He worked as a baker in that city. He only served one term.

He died in 1867 in Sarpsborg.
