= Arne Gjedrem =

Norwegian politician (1890–1978)

Arne Gjedrem (26 April 1890 – 31 December 1978) was a Norwegian politician for the Liberal Party.

He served as a deputy representative to the Norwegian Parliament from Rogaland during the term 1945–1949.
