= Christian Hansen Vennemoe =

Norwegian politician

Christian Hansen Vennemoe (24 November 1812 – 30 May 1901) was a Norwegian politician.

He was elected to the Norwegian Parliament in 1868, representing the constituency of Akershus Amt. He worked as a banker and farmer there. He was re-elected in 1871 and 1874.
