= Battle of Tistedalen =

Battle of the Swedish–Norwegian War of 1814

- Part of the Swedish–Norwegian War of 1814
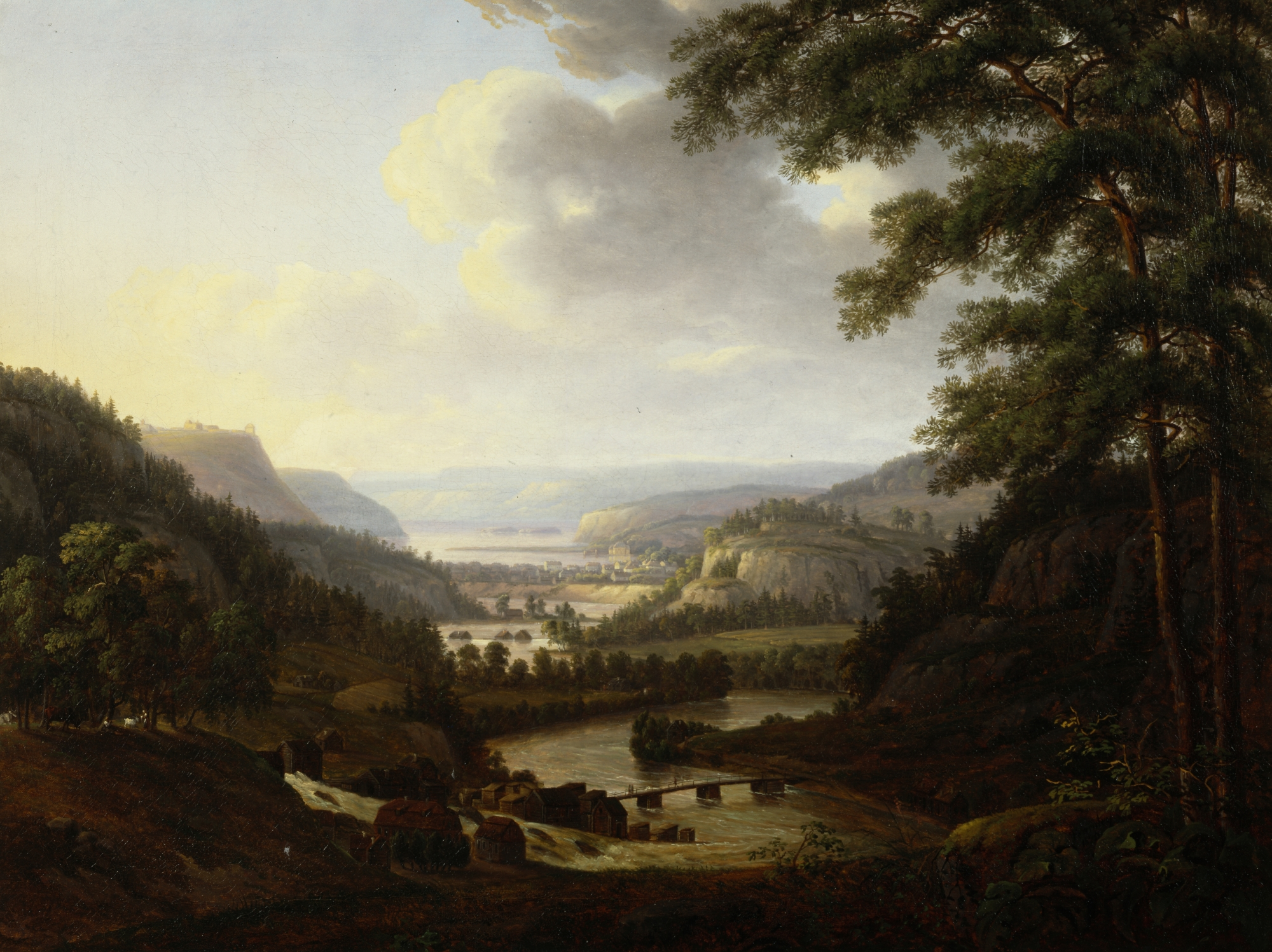
- Tistedalen in 1826, by Thomas Fearnley
Date	1 August 1814
Location	Tistedalen, Norway 59°08′N 11°27′E
Result	Swedish victory

Belligerents
Norway	Sweden

Commanders and leaders
(Norway) Johan Spørck	Pehr Brändström

Strength
400–600	1,500

Casualties and losses
27 killed or wounded 45 captured	3 killed 13 wounded

War of the Sixth Coalition:
Swedish–Norwegian War (1814)
The color black indicates the current battle.

The Battle of Tistedalen was a series of skirmishes in the Swedish–Norwegian War of 1814, at Tistedalen, Norway.

== Prelude ==
At July 30, a Swedish army under Hans Henric von Essen crossed the southern Norwegian border (among them the Régiment Royal-Suédois). A small Norwegian force of a couple hundred men, under Johan Henrik Spørck, withdrew to an advantageous position behind the Tista, at Veden, to delay the Swedes long enough for reinforcements to arrive. Essen sent Eberhard von Vegesack to block the Norwegian fortress of Fredriksten, while a smaller force of 1,500 men under Pehr Brändström marched towards Spørck, in an attempt to force the crossing; after receiving some reinforcements, Spørck's army counted between 400 and 600 men.

== Battle ==
At 1 August, Brändström opened up with two cannons to force the Norwegians to retire but without result; instead he ordered a battalion of the Västmanland Regiment to wade over the river opposite the Norwegian left flank, while other units feinted attacks elsewhere. Once across, the Västmanland battalion launched a bayonet attack which, after two hours of fighting, drove the Norwegians away. The Swedes had lost 3 killed and 13 wounded; the Norwegians had over 27 killed and wounded and 45 men captured. Essen reached Torpum the next day and there united his forces with the Swedish Crown Prince Charles John.
