= Oluf Steen Julius Berner =

Norwegian politician

Oluf Steen Julius Berner (23 September 1809 – 12 September 1885) was a Norwegian politician.

He was born in 1809 in Laurvig. He was the son of merchant Joachim Berner and Karen Christine Berner, née Blom. In 1840, he married Marie Lovise Falkenberg, daughter of Christian Bugge Falkenberg (1781–1848) and Lovise Augusta (1791–1840), née Linaae. The couple had one child, Carl Berner, who became a notable politician. He was born in 1841, but Marie Lovise died in childbed. Oluf Steen Julius Berner married again, to Christiane Sofie Rømer (1812–1850), in 1846 in Kragerø.

Berner was elected to the Norwegian Parliament in 1854, representing the constituency of Christiansand. He worked as an assessor in that city. He sat through one term.
