= Hans Jensen Blom =

Norwegian politician

Hans Jensen Blom (19 May 1812 – 13 April 1875) was a Norwegian politician and clergyman.

Hans Jensen Blom was from Skien in Telemark county, Norway.

He was elected to the Norwegian Parliament in 1848, representing the constituency of Stavanger. He worked as a chaplain there, but was then appointed vicar (sogneprest) in the countryside, being re-elected in 1851 and 1854 from Stavanger Amt. He was appointed vicar in Kinn Municipality at the Kinn Church in 1854, and was elected to Parliament from the constituency Nordre Bergenhuus Amt in 1859 and 1862. In 1862, he moved to Melhus Municipality, and represented Søndre Trondhjems Amt as a deputy representative in 1868.

== See also ==
- Blom (family from Skien)
