= Peder Paulsen Anzjøn =

Norwegian politician

Peder Paulsen Anzjøn (23 January 1806 – 23 May 1890) was a Norwegian politician.

He was elected to the Norwegian Parliament in 1842, and his term ended in 1844. He represented the rural constituency of Søndre Trondhjems Amt (today named Sør-Trøndelag). He worked as a farmer and bailiff. He sat through one term.
