= 1816 in Norway =

- Centuries: 17th; 18th; 19th; 20th; 21st
- Decades: 1790s; 1800s; 1810s; 1820s; 1830s
- See also: 1816 in Sweden; List of years in Norway

Events in the year 1816 in Norway.

== Incumbents ==
- Monarch: Charles II.

== Events ==
- 26 May - The Norwegian Bible Society, the oldest interchurch organization in Norway is founded.
- 14 June - Norges Bank, the central bank of Norway is founded.

=== Full date unknown ===
- Bodø was granted township status.
- Grimstad received city rights.
- Carl Carlsson Mörner is appointed Governor-general of Norway.

== Arts and literature ==
- The oldest theatre building in Scandinavia; Trøndelag Teater was built.

== Births ==
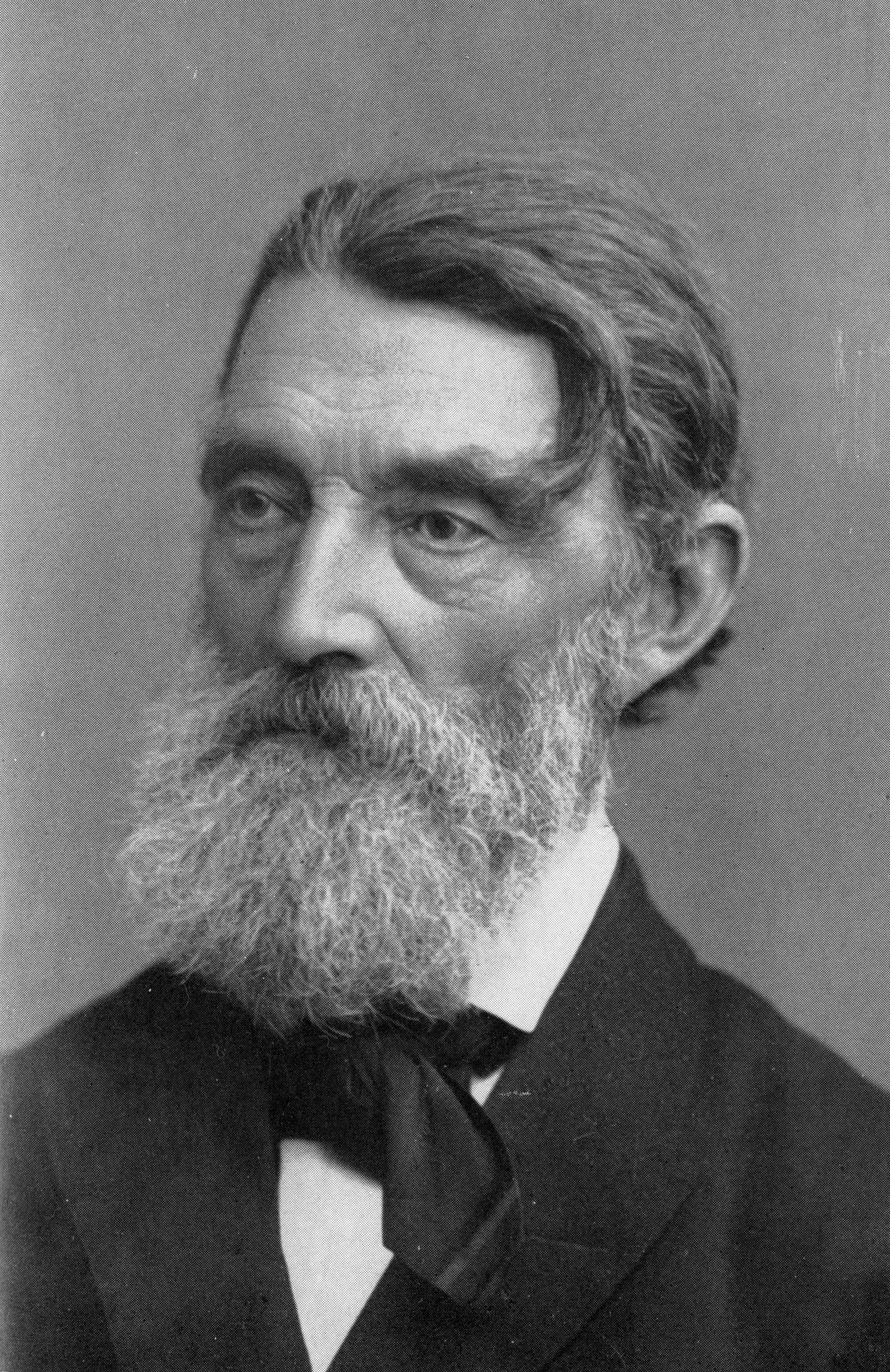
Johan Sverdrup, Prime Minister of Norway

- 5 January – Jens Zetlitz Kielland, consul and artist (d.1881)
- 16 March – Vilhelmine Ullmann, proponent for women's rights (d. 1915).
- 30 May – Jacob Smith Jarmann, firearms designer (d.1894)
- 6 June – August Thomle, jurist and politician (d.1889)
- 30 July – Johan Sverdrup, politician and first Prime Minister of Norway (d.1892)
- 16 October – Christian Torber Hegge Geelmuyden, navy officer and politician (d.1885)
- 16 December – Adam Hiorth, merchant and industrial pioneer (died 1871).

=== Full date unknown ===
- Paul Peter Vilhelm Breder, politician (d.1890)
- Erik Jonsson Helland, Hardanger fiddle maker (d.1868)
- Wilhelm Nielsen, politician

== Deaths ==
- 26 March – Johan Ernst Mowinckel, merchant and consul (b. 1759).
- 26 July – Johan Nordahl Brun, poet, dramatist, bishop and politician (b.1745)
