= 1886 in Norway =

- Centuries: 17th; 18th; 19th; 20th; 21st
- Decades: 1860s; 1870s; 1880s; 1890s; 1900s
- See also: 1886 in Sweden; List of years in Norway

Events in the year 1886 in Norway.

== Incumbents ==
- Monarch: Oscar II.
- Prime Minister: Johan Sverdrup

== Events ==
=== Undated ===
- Arendal crash: Arendals Privatbank goes bankrupt. Co-owner Axel Nicolai Herlofson is exposed for large-scale fraud, ending Arendal’s prominence as a shipping town.
- The Norwegian Medical Association is established.
- Albertine, a novel by Christian Krohg, is first published.
- Mannfolk, a novel by Arne Garborg, is first published.
- Hjalmar Løken becomes the editor of Dagsposten, a Trondheim-based Liberal newspaper, serving until 1890.

=== February ===
- 24 February - At Raukleiv’s first Siljordsskirendet, Johannes Nordgården falls at a 27 m world record, and Olaf Bergland later sets the official record at 25.5 m.

=== June ===
- 1-30 June - Numerous Norwegian emigrants arrived in North American ports aboard transatlantic steamships, including New York, Quebec, Boston, Philadelphia, and Halifax.

== Notable births ==
- 2 January - Elise Ottesen-Jensen, sex educator, journalist and anarchist agitator (died 1973)
- 6 January - Hans Oskar Evju, politician (died 1967)
- 11 January – Johannes Lid, botanist (died (1971)).
- 23 January – Halvard Olsen, politician and trade unionist (died 1966).
- 18 February – Trygve Bøyesen, gymnast and Olympic silver medallist (died 1963)
- 20 February – Jørgen Andersen, gymnast and Olympic silver medallist (died 1973)
- 22 February – Nils Voss, gymnast and Olympic gold medallist (died 1974)
- 3 March – Tore Ørjasæter, poet (died 1968)
- 4 March – Ola Solberg, newspaper editor and politician (died 1977)
- 16 March – Sigurd Smebye, gymnast and Olympic bronze medallist (died 1954)
- 22 March – Arthur Amundsen, gymnast and Olympic silver medallist (died 1936)
- 4 April – Jens Marcus Mottré, politician (died 1966)
- 19 April – Olaf Sletten, shooter and Olympic silver medallist (died 1943)
- 24 May – Nils Emaus Nilsen, politician (died 1976)
- 12 June – Jacob Prytz, goldsmith and designer (died 1962).
- 24 June – Ragnhild Hartmann Varmbo, politician (died 1982)
- 20 July – Thor Larsen, gymnast and Olympic silver medallist
- 10 August – Svein Olsen Øraker, politician (died 1963)
- 18 September – Paul Pedersen, gymnast and Olympic silver medallist (died 1948)
- 3 November – Hans Næss, sailor and Olympic gold medallist (died 1958)
- 3 November – Henrik Nielsen, gymnast and Olympic silver medallist (died 1973)
- 4 November – Theodor Dahl, journalist and fiction writer (d. 1946).
- 14 November – Marius Nygaard Smith-Petersen, Norwegian American physician and orthopaedic surgeon (died 1953)
- 25 November – Jens Bull, jurist and diplomat (died 1956).
- 1 December – Magnus Johansen, politician (died 1970)
- 8 December – Ole Konrad Ribsskog, politician (died 1941)
- 9 December – Marius Eriksen, gymnast and Olympic bronze medallist (died 1950)
- 17 December – Einar Osland, politician (died 1955)

=== Full date unknown ===
- Bjarne Eriksen, businessman (died 1976)
- Thorstein John Ohnstad Fretheim, politician (died 1971)
- Ingar Nielsen, sailor and Olympic gold medallist
- Ferdinand Schjelderup, mountaineer, Supreme Court Justice and resistance member (died 1955)
- Henny Skjønberg, actress and stage director (died 1973)
- Olav Martinus Knutsen Steinnes, politician and Minister (died 1961)

== Notable deaths ==
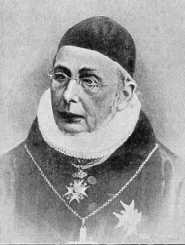
Andreas Grimelund

- 3 January – Andreas Grimelund, bishop (born 1812)
- 20 February – Ludwig Andreas Olsen, United States Navy sailor awarded two Medals of Honor (born 1845)
- 2 April – Christian Halvorsen Svenkerud, politician (born 1798)
- 27 May – Tellef Dahll Schweigaard, politician (born 1806)
- 15 August –Jens Amundsen, ship-owner (born 1820)
- 12 September – Johannes Henrik Berg, politician (born 1797)
- 4 October – Thomas Johannessen Heftye, businessperson, politician and philanthropist (born 1822)
- 4 November – Ole C. Johnson, soldier in the American Civil War (born 1838)
- 28 December – Peder Sather, banker and philanthropist (born 1810)

=== Full date unknown ===
- Søren Jørgensen Aandahl, politician (born 1802)
