= Gustav Christian Gjøs =

Norwegian politician

Gustav Christian Gjøs (20 January 1810 – 29 June 1889) was a Norwegian politician.

He was elected to the Norwegian Parliament in 1851, representing the constituency of Fredrikshald. He worked as a master painter in that city. He only served one term.

In 1833 he married Inger Kistine Petersen from Berg. They had several children.
