= 1877 in Norway =

- Centuries: 17th; 18th; 19th; 20th; 21st
- Decades: 1850s; 1860s; 1870s; 1880s; 1890s
- See also: 1877 in Sweden; List of years in Norway

First performance of Henrik Ibsen's A Doll's House

Events in the year 1877 in Norway.

== Incumbents ==
- Monarch: Oscar II .
- Prime Minister: Frederik Stang

== Events ==
- The Røros Line was opened.

== Arts and literature ==
- 25 April - The local newspaper Agder Flekkefjords Tidende was first published.

== Births ==
=== January to June ===
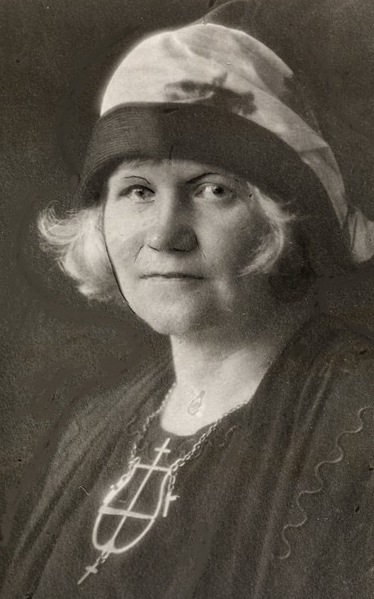
Marta Steinsvik, proponent for women's rights, first female to graduate from the Norwegian School of Theology

- 11 February – Aasa Helgesen, midwife and politician (died 1968).
- 25 February – Bernt Tunold, painter (died 1946)
- 5 March – Klaus Sletten, organizational worker, editor and politician (died 1946)
- 23 March – Marta Steinsvik, author and translator (died 1950)
- 29 March – Nils Waltersen Aasen, arms inventor (died 1925)
- 12 April – Ragnvald A. Nestos, governor of the U.S. state of North Dakota (died 1942)
- 19 April – Ole Evinrude, inventor, known for the invention of the first outboard motor with practical commercial application (died 1934)
- 26 April – Alfred Næss, speed skater (died 1955)
- 5 May – Halfdan Egedius, painter and illustrator (died 1899)
- 6 May – Bjarne Solberg, physician and politician (died 1928)

=== July to December ===
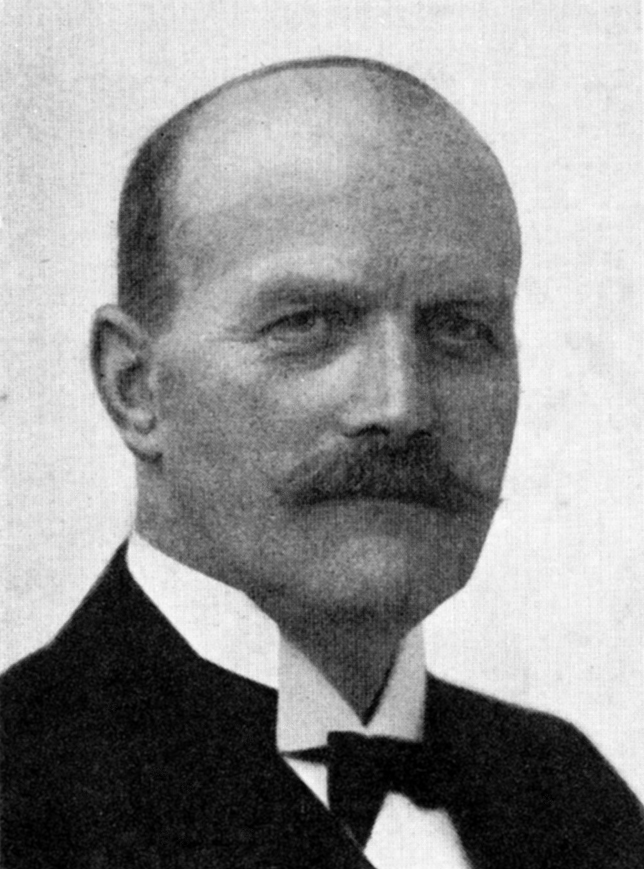
Harald Halvorsen

- 18 July – Arne Sejersted, sailor and Olympic gold medallist (died 1960)
- 17 August – Bernhoff Hansen, wrestler and Olympic gold medallist (died 1950)
- 28 August – Anna Schønheyder, painter and textile artist (died 1927).
- 8 September – Rasmus Pettersen, gymnast and Olympic gold medallist (died 1957)
- 8 September – Gunnar Ousland, writer, editor and politician for the Labour Party (died 1967)
- 13 September – Harald Halvorsen, politician (died 1943).
- 16 September – Carsten Tank-Nielsen, admiral (died 1957).
- 9 October – Isak Halvorsen, politician
- 12 October – Alf Hjort, electrical engineer in America (died 1944)
- 16 October – Bjørn Helland-Hansen, oceanographer (died 1957)
- 16 October – Per Savio, polar explorer and dog sled driver (died 1905).
- 4 November – Benjamin Blessum, Norwegian-American painter, graphic artist, illustrator (died 1954)
- 29 November – Fredrik Barbe Wallem, art historian (died 1945).

=== Full date unknown ===
- Ole Ludvig Bærøe, politician (died 1943)
- Halfdan Egedius, painter and illustrator (died 1899)
- Per Klingenberg Hestetun, politician (died 1928)
- Karl Hovelsen, Nordic skier (died 1955)
- Ivar Larsen Kirkeby-Garstad, politician and Minister (died 1951)
- Lars Oftedal, politician and Minister (died 1932)
- Nikolai Nissen Paus, surgeon (died 1956)
- Haakon Shetelig, archaeologist (died 1955)
- Gunnar Ousland, writer, editor and politician (died 1967)
- Erik Solem, judge (died 1949)

== Deaths ==
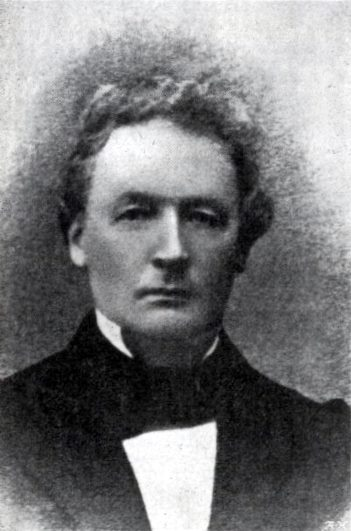
Eskild Bruun

- 9 October – Eskild Bruun, barrister, judge and businessman (b. 1804).
- 25 December – Hans Gerhard Colbjørnsen Meldahl, jurist and politician (born 1815)

=== Full date unknown ===
- Christian Peder Bianco Boeck, doctor, zoologist and mountaineer (born 1798)
- Hans Wille, priest and politician (born 1807)
