= 1887 in Norway =

- Centuries: 17th; 18th; 19th; 20th; 21st
- Decades: 1860s; 1870s; 1880s; 1890s; 1900s
- See also: 1887 in Sweden; List of years in Norway

Events in the year 1887 in Norway.

== Incumbents ==
- Monarch: Oscar II.
- Prime Minister: Johan Sverdrup

== Events ==
- 21 August – The Norwegian Labour Party was established.

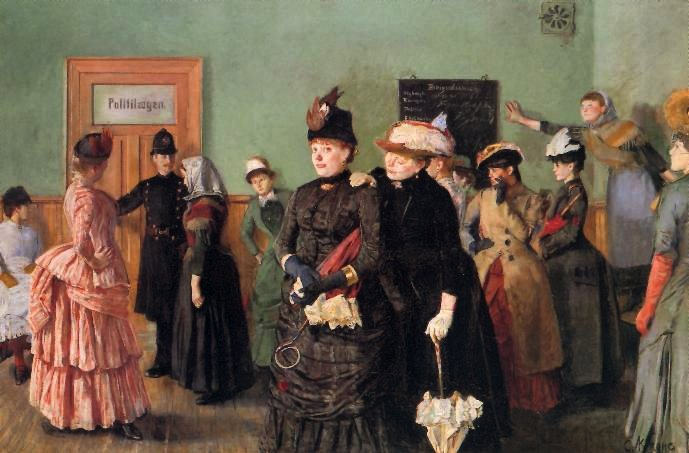
Albertine i politilægens venteværelse.

== Arts and literature ==
- Albertine i politilægens venteværelse, is painted by Christian Krohg.
- A Country Cobbler, naturalist is painted by Harriet Backer.
- Sjur Gabriel (Hellemyrsfolket), Naturalist book is written by Amalie Skram.
- To Venner (hellemyrsfolket), is written by Amalie Skram.
- Om Albertine, pamphlet is written by Amalie Skram.

== Births ==
=== January to March ===
- 7 January – Ingvald Tøndel, politician (died 1952)
- 15 January – Charles Mackenzie Bruff, forensic chemist (died 1955)
- 17 January – Ola Raknes, psychoanalyst and philologist (died 1975)
- 30 January – Lauritz Bergendahl, Nordic skier (died 1964)
- 15 February – Sigurd Jørgensen, gymnast and Olympic gold medallist (died 1929)
- 16 February – Kristian Fjeld, politician and Minister (died 1976)
- 11 March – Henry Olsen, track and field athlete (died 1978)
- 15 March – Johanne Samueline Pedersen, politician (died 1961)
- 20 March – Hans Eidnes, politician (died 1962)
- 26 March – Yngvar Fredriksen, gymnast and Olympic gold medallist (died 1958)

=== April to June ===
- 2 April – Øyvind Alfred Stensrud, politician (died 1956)
- 4 April – Peder Morset, teacher and resistance member (died 1943)
- 10 April – Alf Lie, gymnast and Olympic gold medallist (died 1969)
- 24 April – Lars Slagsvold, veterinarian (died 1959)
- 28 April – Thomas Aas, sailor and Olympic gold medallist (died 1961)
- 3 May – Harald Halvorsen, gymnast and Olympic silver medalist (died 1965)
- 7 May – Olav Berntsen Oksvik, politician and Minister (died 1958)
- 13 May – Sverre Kornelius Eilertsen Støstad, politician and Minister (died 1959)
- 14 May – Petter Martinsen, gymnast and Olympic gold medallist (died 1972)
- 18 May – Eugen Lunde, sailor and Olympic gold medallist (died 1963)
- 23 May – Thoralf Skolem, mathematician (died 1963)
- 12 June – Laurits Grønland, politician (died 1957)
- 22 June – Oscar Olstad, gymnast and Olympic bronze medallist (died 1977)
- 25 June – Axel Henry Hansen, gymnast and Olympic bronze medallist (died 1980)

=== July to September ===
- 3 July – Carl Klæth, gymnast and Olympic silver medallist (died 1966)
- 18 July – Vidkun Quisling, army officer, politician and Minister-President of Norway, executed (died 1945)
- 27 July – Kristoffer Skåne Grytnes, politician (died 1965)
- 11 August – Adolph M. Christianson, justice of the North Dakota Supreme Court (died 1954)
- 12 August – Erling Falk, businessman and politician (died 1940)
- 19 August – Otto Monsen, track and field athlete (died 1979)
- 20 August – Engebret Skogen, rifle shooter and Olympic bronze medallist (died 1968)
- 25 August – Fartein Valen, composer and musical theorist (died 1952)
- 11 September – Oscar Larsen, middle distance runner (died 1975)
- 16 September – Knut Fixdal, road engineer and civil servant (died 1969)
- 18 September – Harald Gram, jurist, politician and genealogist (died 1961)
- 22 September – Thoralf Hagen, rower and Olympic bronze medallist (died 1979)

=== October to December ===
- 1 October – Anders Moen, gymnast and Olympic silver medallist (died 1966)
- 4 October – Francis Bull, literary historian, professor, essayist and magazine editor (died 1974)
- 20 October – Arne Halse, athlete and Olympic silver medallist (died 1975)
- 26 October – Arnfinn Heje, sailor and Olympic gold medallist (died 1958)
- 28 October – Friedrich Georg Nissen, civil servant (died 1969)
- 22 November – Knut Knutsson Steintjønndalen, Hardanger fiddle maker (died 1969)
- 23 November – Andreas Knudsen, sailor and Olympic silver medallist (died 1982)
- 7 December – Knut Olaf Andreasson Strand, politician (died 1980)
- 10 December – Olga Bjoner, politician and organizational leader (died 1969).
- 24 December – Axel Revold, painter (died 1962).

== Deaths ==
- 23 May – Ludvig Mathias Lindeman, composer and organist (born 1812)
- 16 July – Jørgen Tandberg Ebbesen, politician (born 1812)
- 7 August – Harald Kolbeinson Guddal, politician (born 1798)
- 24 September – Leonhard Christian Borchgrevink Holmboe, priest and politician (born 1802)
