= Marie Colban =

Norwegian writer and translator (1814–1884)

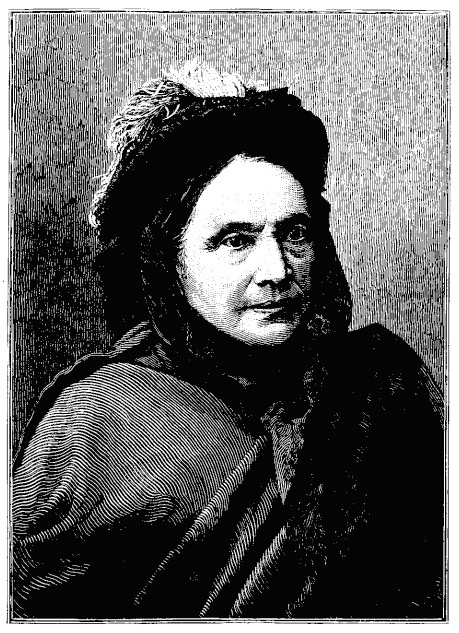
- Colban as printed in the magazine Illustreret Tidende shortly after her death in 1884
- Born: 18 December 1814; Christiania, Norway
- Died: 27 March 1884 (aged 69); Rome, Italy
- Occupations: novelist, short story writer and translator

Marie Colban (18 December 1814 – 27 March 1884) was a Norwegian novelist, short story writer and translator.

== Biography ==
She was born at Christiania (now Oslo), Norway. She was the daughter of Peter Nicolai Schmidt (1776–1846) and Petronelle Sandberg (1787–1846). Her father was an attorney. She was married to teacher Nathanael Angell Colban (1793–1850) from 1836. After his death in 1850 she resided in Paris from 1856 and also wrote for Norwegian newspapers. In the summer months she usually visited Norway, but in the autumn she returned to Paris.

She translated Eugène Sue's novel Mathilde and other literary works from French into Norwegian language. Her first literary work was Lærerinden from 1869. She later wrote Tre Noveller, 1873, and Jeg lever, 1877. From 1882 to 1884 she published a series of memoir articles from her Paris years in the magazine Nyt Tidsskrift. She spent her final years in Rome, where she died in 1884 and was buried at the Protestant Cemetery.

== Selected works ==
- Lærerinden, en Skizze, 1869
- Tre Noveller, tilegnet norske Kvinder, 1873
- Tre nye Noveller, 1875
- Jeg lever, 1877
- En gammel Jomfru, 1879
- Cleopatra, 1880
- Thyra, 1882
