= Ludvig Johan Carl Manthey =

Norwegian civil servant (1809–1875)

Ludvig Johan Carl Manthey (1 September 1809 – 8 October 1875) was a Norwegian civil servant.

He graduated as cand.jur. in 1834. After a career in a Norwegian government ministry, he was appointed stipendiary magistrate (byfoged) in Tromsøe in 1855. From 1859 to his death in 1875 he held the same position in Trondhjem.

He was a brother of August Christian Manthey, the government minister.
