= Sjur Aasmundsen Sexe =

Norwegian mineralogist (1808–1888)

Sjur Aasmundsen Sexe (14 August 1808 – 17 February 1888) was a Norwegian mineralogist and educator.

== Biography ==
Sexe was from Ullensvang parish in Søndre Bergenhus county, Norway. He was the son of Aamund Sjursen Sexe (1769–1864) and Brita Torsteinsdatter Mæland. He grew up on a farm with pietist parents who were members of the Haugean movement. He attended Bergen Cathedral School and took the examen artium in 1834. Sexe studied rock science at the University of Christiania (now University of Oslo) and graduated with a cand.miner. degree in 1840. During the years 1843–1844 he received a state scholarship to complete study trips at mines in Sweden and Germany and at the University of Berlin.

After graduating in 1840, he became an aspirant at the Kongsberg Silver Mines and in 1841 assistant mining master in the Nordenfjells mountain district. In 1846, he first worked in Trondhjem as a mine superintendent, later at the Kongsberg Silver Mines. He was dismissed from the position in 1850.

He was mayor of Kongsberg Municipality for three months in 1851, being succeeded by Jens Landmark who was the director of Kongsberg Weapons Factory. In 1852, he took a job as a teacher at Hartvig Nissen School in Christiania. From 1860 to 1877 he was a professor in physical geography at the University of Christiania. He was a member of the Norwegian Academy of Science and Letters.

== Related reading ==
- Sjur Aasmundsen Sexe (1872) On the rise of land in Scandinavia (University of Oslo)
