= Historisk-philosophiske Samlinger =

Norwegian journal (1811–1813)

Historisk-philosophiske Samlinger (Historical-Philosophical Collections) was a Norwegian journal published by the Norwegian Society for Development (Selskabet for Norges Vel) from 1811 to 1813.

Publications in the journal especially included submissions by winners of the Norwegian Society for Development Prize. Among others, these include Nicolai Wergeland's prize-winning composition arguing for a separate Norwegian university in Christiania, Mnemosyne, which was published in 1811. Bishop Johan Ernst Gunnerus's older treatment of the same subject was also published in the journal in 1812. Some of Niels Hertzberg's meteorological measurements were also published in the journal.

The journal's editor was Ludvig Stoud Platou, who was also chairman of the society's historical-philosophical section. The society also published the newspaper Budstikken.
