= 1875 in Norway =

- Centuries: 17th; 18th; 19th; 20th; 21st
- Decades: 1850s; 1860s; 1870s; 1880s; 1890s
- See also: 1875 in Sweden; List of years in Norway

Events in the year 1875 in Norway.

== Incumbents ==
- Monarch: Oscar II .
- Prime Minister: Frederik Stang

== Events ==
- 31 December – Population Census: 1,813,424 inhabitants in Norway.
- The Norwegian krone was introduced, replacing the Norwegian speciedaler.
- The Metric system was introduced and replaced the old measurement units (de jure).
- The town of Mosjøen is founded.

== Arts and literature ==
- The local newspaper Fædrelandsvennen was first published.

== Births ==
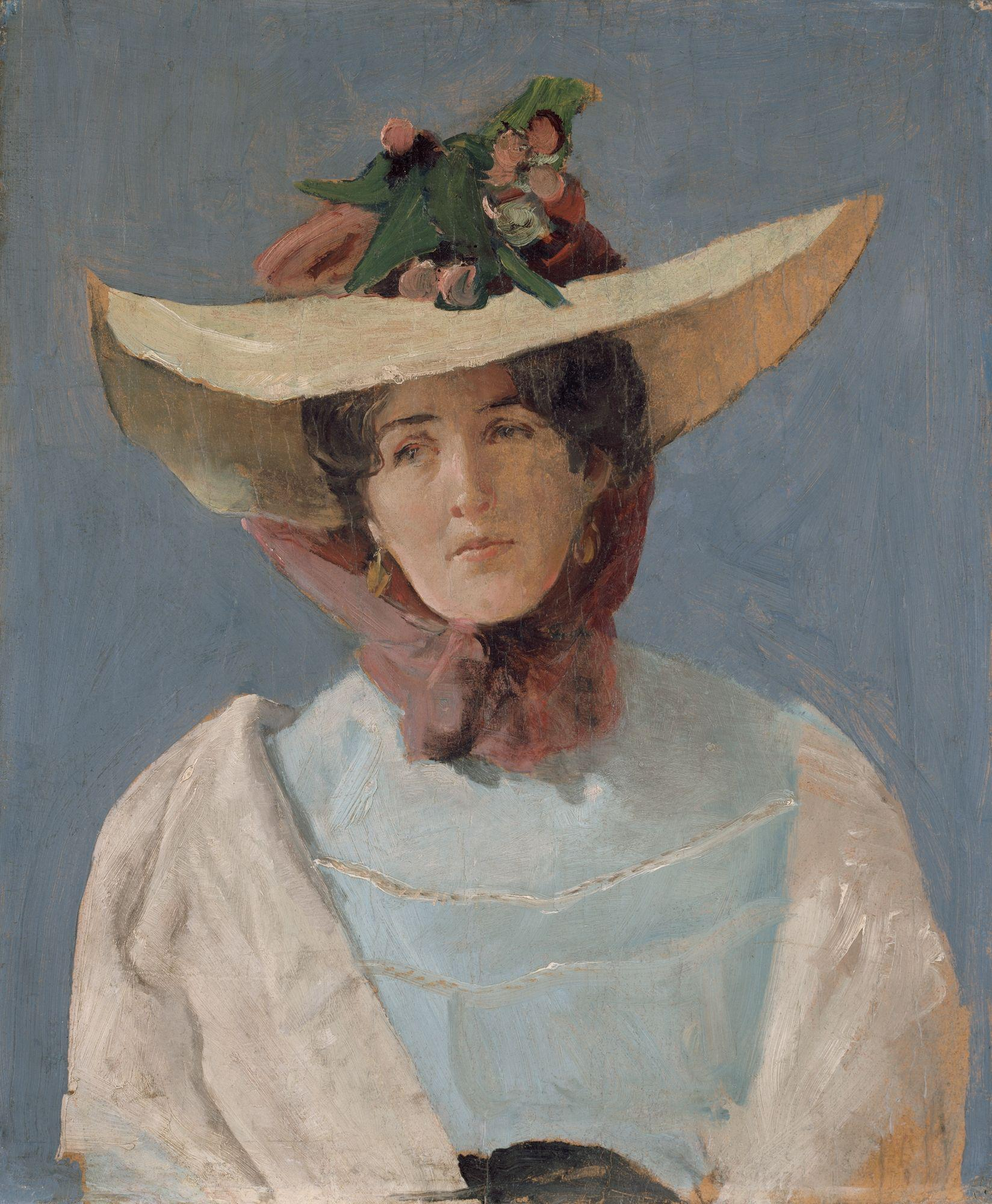
Agnes Mowinckel portrayed by Christian Krohg.

- 27 January – Eilert Falch-Lund, sailor and Olympic gold medallist (died 1960)
- 6 February – Mads Gram, physician (died 1929)
- 28 March – Ragnhild Jølsen, author (died 1908)
- 4 April – Olav Hoprekstad, educator and writer (died 1965).
- 9 April – Kristian Laake, Commanding General of the Norwegian Army 1931–1940 (died 1950)
- 22 April – Gustav Adolf Lammers Heiberg, barrister and politician (died 1948)
- 31 May – Helga Eng, psychologist and educationalist (died 1966).
- 15 June – Herman Smith-Johannsen, cross-country skier and supercentenarian (died 1987)
- 25 August – Agnes Mowinckel, actress and stage producer (died 1963).
- 12 November – Kristian Geelmuyden, politician (died 1969)
- 16 November – Johan Wollebæk, jurist and diplomat (died 1940)
- 17 November – Birger Eriksen, military officer (died 1958)
- 21 December – Halvor Møgster, sailor and Olympic gold medallist (died 1950)

=== Full date unknown ===
- Torger Baardseth, bookseller and publisher (died 1947)
- Jacob Gundersen, freestyle wrestler and Olympic silver medallist (died 1968)
- Olav Gunnarsson Helland, Hardanger fiddle maker (died 1946)
- Olaf Lange, painter and graphic designer (died 1965)
- Niels Thorshaug, veterinarian (died 1942)
- Jacob Vidnes, trade unionist, newspaper editor and politician (died 1940)
- Emanuel Vigeland, artist (died 1948)

== Deaths ==
- 13 June – Eilert Sundt, sociologist (born 1817)

=== Full date unknown ===
- Hans Severin Arentz, politician (born 1806)
- Hans Jensen Blom, politician (born 1812)
- Ivar Christian Sommerschild Geelmuyden, politician (born 1819)
- Ludvig Johan Carl Manthey, civil servant (born 1809)
- Erik Røring Møinichen, politician and Minister (born 1797)
- Ingebrigt Haldorsen Sæter, politician (born 1800)
