= 1885 in Norway =

- Centuries: 17th; 18th; 19th; 20th; 21st
- Decades: 1860s; 1870s; 1880s; 1890s; 1900s
- See also: 1885 in Sweden; List of years in Norway

Events in the year 1885 in Norway.

== Incumbents ==
- Monarch: Oscar II.
- Prime Minister: Johan Sverdrup

== Events ==
- Norwegian parliamentary election is won by the Liberal Party of Norway.
- 26 February – A speed skating duel at Frognerkilen between Axel Paulsen and Renke van der Zee was attended by between 20,000 and 30,000 spectators.

== Arts and literature ==
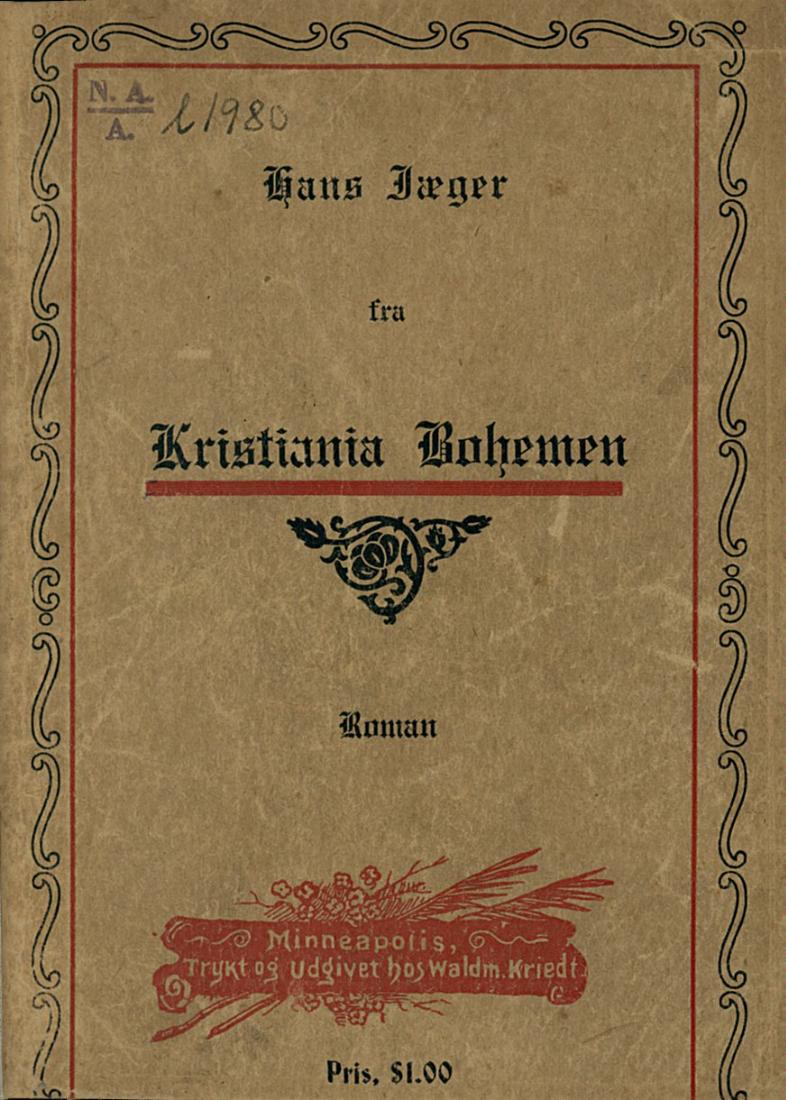
Fra Kristiania-Bohêmen

- Fra Kristiania-Bohêmen, novel by Hans Jæger, is first published.

== Births ==
=== January to March ===
- 8 January – Anders Hove, politician (died 1978)
- 8 January – Anders Tjøstolvsen Noddeland, politician (died 1960)
- 16 January – Kristian Østervold, sailor and Olympic gold medallist (died 1960)
- 27 January – Gunnar Grantz, Olympic rower (died 1941).
- 1 February – Rasmus Hatledal, topographer and military officer (died 1963)
- 25 February – Fritz Skullerud, long-distance runner and station master (died 1969)
- 26 February – Odd Isaachsen Willoch, naval officer (died 1940)
- 11 March – Per Mathiesen, gymnast and Olympic gold medallist (died 1971)
- 17 March – Einar Strøm, gymnast and Olympic gold medallist (died 1964)

=== April to June ===
- 4 April – Daniel Johansen, track and field athlete (died 1967)
- 26 April – Hans Peter Elisa Lødrup, journalist, newspaper editor, non-fiction writer and politician (died 1955).
- 27 May – Kristian Johan Bodøgaard, politician (died 1971)
- 2 June – Tollef Tollefsen, rower and Olympic bronze medallist (died 1963)
- 2 June – Carl Julius Alvin Westerlund, politician (died 1952)
- 15 June – Ole Landmark, architect (died 1970)
- 24 June – Olaf Holtedahl, geologist (died 1975)

=== July to September ===
- 28 July – Jens Martin Arctander Jenssen, politician (died 1968)
- 17 August – Alfred Høy, manager of Meraker Smelteverk (died 1970).
- 29 August – Paul Martin Dahlø, politician (died 1967)
- 12 September – Lars Sverkeson Romundstad, politician (died 1961)
- 29 September – Karl Johan Fjermeros, politician (died 1972)

=== October to December ===
- 13 October – Viggo Brun, mathematician (died 1978)
- 17 November – Christian Ludvig Jensen, barrister, politician and organizational leader (died 1978).
- 23 November – Sverre Gjørwad, politician (died 1969)
- 26 November – Ole Jensen Rong, politician (died 1953)
- 6 December – Helge Klæstad, judge (died 1965)
- 9 December – Søren Hans Smith Sørensen, ship-owner and politician (died 1973)

=== Full date unknown ===
- Olav Gullvåg, playwright, novelist, poet and editor (died 1961)
- Magnhild Haalke, novelist (died 1984)
- Alf Jacobsen, sailor and Olympic gold medallist
- Arne Kildal, librarian and civil servant (died 1972)
- Lars Magnus Moen, politician and Minister (died 1964)
- Ulrik Olsen, politician and Minister (died 1963)

== Deaths ==
- 13 May – Christian Torber Hegge Geelmuyden, navy officer and politician (born 1816)
- 12 September – Oluf Steen Julius Berner, politician (died 1809)

=== Full date unknown ===
- Peter Christen Asbjørnsen, writer and scholar (born 1812)
- Nils Jønsberg, priest and politician (born 1808)
