= Axel (name) =

- Pronunciation: /ˈæksəl/ Swedish: [ˈǎksɛl] French: [aksɛl] Spanish: [aɣˈsel]
- Gender: Male
- Language: Swedish, Norwegian, Danish, Icelandic, German, French, Spanish, Dutch
- Name day: Sweden: 16 June; Finland: 23 March

Origin
- Origin: Absalom
- Meaning: 'Father of Peace'
- Region of origin: Scandinavia

Other names
- Alternative spelling: Aksel, Axl
- Nickname: Axe
- Related names: Absalom, Akseli, Askel

Axel (also Aksel) is a Scandinavian, German, French, Dutch and Icelandic masculine given name. In Estonia, Denmark, and Norway the spelling Aksel is more common. The Finnish form of the name is Akseli, while a French feminine form is Axelle. Axel is sometimes used as a surname.

Because the Danish archbishop Absalon (1128–1201) was also known as "Axel of Lund", the name has been interpreted as a corruption of the Hebrew name Absalom. Axel arose via Axelen from Absalon, possibly by conflation with the existing names Askel and Askil, medieval forms of the Old Norse name Ásketill, from ans "god" and ketill "cauldron/helmet".

== As a given name ==
- Axel (born 1977), Argentine singer-songwriter
- Absalon (1128–1201), Danish archbishop also known as Axel of Lund
- Prince Axel of Denmark (1888–1964)
- Axel Aabrink (1887–1965), Danish painter
- Axel Gustav Adlercreutz (1821–1880), Swedish politician and civil servant
- Axel Alfredsson (1902–1966), Swedish footballer
- Axel Algmark (born 1990), Swedish pop singer
- Axel von Ambesser (1910–1988), German actor and film director
- Axel Anderberg (1860–1937), Swedish architect
- Axel Andersen (1891–1931), Danish gymnast
- Axel Andersen Byrval (1875–1957), Danish football player and manager
- Axel Anderson (1929–2012), German-born Puerto Rican actor, television producer and television host
- Axel Andersson (1887–1951), Swedish track and field athlete
- Axel Andrésson (1895–1961), Icelandic footballer and football club founder
- Axel Óskar Andrésson (born 1998), Icelandic footballer
- Axel Aubert (1873–1943), Norwegian chemical engineer
- Axel Augis (born 1990), French gymnast
- Axel Axelsson (born 1942), Icelandic footballer
- Axel Axelsson (born 1951), Icelandic handball player
- Axel Axgil (1915–2011), Danish gay rights activist, first man to enter into a same-sex registered partnership
- Axel Bäck (born 1987), Swedish alpine skier
- Axel Bachmann (born 1989), Paraguayan chess player
- Axel Bakayoko (born 1998), French footballer
- Axel Bakunts (1899–1937), Armenian prose writer, film-writer, translator and activist
- Axel Bassani (born 1999), Italian motorcycle racer
- Axel Bauer (born 1961), French singer
- Axel J. Beck (1894–1981), American federal judge
- Axel D. Becke (born 1953), Canadian physical chemist, professor and researcher
- Axel Bellinghausen (born 1983), German footballer
- Axel Berg (1856–1929), Danish architect
- Axel Berg (born 1959), German politician
- Axel Berndt (born 19??), German sprint canoer
- Axel Bernstein (1974–2017), German politician
- Axel Birnbaum (born 1966), Austrian fencer
- Axel Blake (born 1988), British stand-up comedian
- Axel Bloch (1911–1998), Danish fencer
- Jan Axel Blomberg (born 1969), Norwegian heavy metal drummer (Mayhem, Arcturus)
- Axel Blomqvist (1894–1965), Swedish speed skater
- Axel Blumberg (1981–2004), Argentine kidnap and murder victim
- Axel Gudbrand Blytt (1843–1898), Norwegian botanist and geologist
- Jonas Axel Boeck (1833–1873), Norwegian marine biologist
- Axel Boëthius (1889–1969), Swedish scholar and archaeologist of Etruscan culture
- Axel Boman (born 19??), Swedish house music DJ and producer
- Axel Borgmann (born 1994), German footballer
- Axel Borup-Jørgensen (1924–2012), Danish composer
- Axel Börsch-Supan (born 1954), German economist and researcher
- Axel Brage (born 1989), Swedish ice hockey player
- Axel Braun (born 19??), Italian adult film producer and director
- Axel Brauns (born 1963), German writer and filmmaker
- Axel Ludvig Broström (1838–1905), Swedish shipping magnate
- Axel Brown (born 1992), Trinidadian - British bobsledder
- Axel T. Brunger (born 1956), German-born American biophysicist
- Axel Bruns (born 19??), German-born Australian scholar
- Axel Brusewitz (1881–1950), Swedish political scientist and professor
- Axel Buch (1930–1998), Norwegian politician
- Axel Bulthaupt (born 1966), German journalist, entertainer and television presenter
- Axel von dem Bussche (1919–1993), German WWII military officer, attempted to assassinate Adolf Hitler
- Axel Cadier (1906–1974), Swedish wrestler
- Axel Chapelle (born 1995), French pole vaulter
- Axel Cleeremans (born 1962), Belgian cognitive scientist and professor
- Axel Clerget (born 1987), French judoka
- Axel Coldevin (1900–1992), Norwegian historian
- Axel Collett (1880–1968), Norwegian landowner, timber merchant and sawmill owner
- Axel Coon (born 1975), German musician
- Axel Corti (1933–1993), Austrian screenwriter, film director and radio host
- Axel Daeseleire (born 1968), Belgian actor
- Axel Danielson (1867–1949), Swedish journalist and Swedish editor
- Axel Danielsson (1863–1899), Swedish socialist agitator, journalist and writer
- Axel de Reuterskiöld (1860–1937), Swedish baron and philatelist
- Axel Didriksson (born 19??), Mexican writer, academic and professor
- Axel Dieter Jr. (born 1990), German professional wrestler
- Axel Disasi (born 1998), French footballer
- Axel Domont (born 1990), French racing cyclist
- Axel Donczew (born 2010), Welsh footballer
- Axel Doruelo (born 1982), Filipino basketball player
- Axel Downard-Wilke (born 1966), transport planner
- Axel Dreher (born 1972), German economist
- Axel Drolsum (1846–1927), Norwegian librarian
- Axel Düberg (1927–2001), Swedish film actor
- Axel Dünnwald-Metzler (1939–2004), German footballer
- Axel Edelstam (1924–2012), Swedish diplomat
- Axel Eggebrecht (1899–1991), German journalist and writer
- Axel Ehnström (born 1990), Finnish singer-songwriter
- Axel Eidstedt (born 1995), Swedish ice hockey player
- Axel Ekblom (1893–1957), Swedish sport shooter
- Axel Elmlund (1838–1901), ballet dancer and stage actor
- Axel Elofs (1903–1983), Swedish long-distance runner
- Axel Ender (1853–1920), Norwegian painter and sculptor
- Axel Enström (1893–1977), Swedish industrialist
- Axel Fredrik Enström (1875–1948), Swedish electrical engineer
- Axel Eriksson (1884–1975), Swedish rower
- Axel Wilhelm Eriksson (1846–1901) Swedish ornithologist, settler, explorer and trader
- Axel Erlandson (1884–1964), Swedish-born American farmer and horticulturalist
- Axel von Fersen the Elder (1719–1794), Swedish statesman and soldier
- Axel von Fersen the Younger (1755–1810), Swedish count, diplomat, military general and statesman
- Axel Firsoff (1912–1981), Swedish-British amateur astronomer and author
- Axel Fischer (born 1966), German politician
- Axel Foley (born 1991), American hip hop musician
- Axel Olof Freudenthal (1836–1911), Finnish philologist and politician
- Axel Gabrielsson (1886–1975), Swedish rower
- Axel Gade (1860–1921), Danish violinist, composer and conductor
- Axel Gedaschko (born 1959), German politician
- Axel Geller (born 1999), Argentine tennis player
- Axel Gjöres (1889–1979), Swedish politician
- Axel Gnos (born 2003), Swiss-French racing driver
- Axel Gotthard (born 1959), German historian and professor
- Axel Graatkjær (1885–1969), Danish cinematographer
- Axel Grandjean (1847–1932), Danish composer and conductor
- Axel Gresvig (born 1941), Norwegian competitive sailor
- Axel Grönberg (1918–1988), Swedish wrestler
- Axel Gyldenstierne (c. 1542–1603) Danish-Norwegian official and Governor-general of Norway
- Axel Gyllenkrok (1665–1730), Swedish baron, military general and governor of Gothenburg
- Axel Gyllenkrok (1888–1946), Norwegian sport shooter
- Axel Gyntersberg (c. 1525–1588), Norwegian nobleman and feudal overlord
- Axel Otto Hagemann (1856–1907), Norwegian politician
- Axel Hager (born 1969), German beach volleyball player
- Axel Haig (1835–1921), Swedish-born British artist, architect and illustrator
- Axel Hallberg (born 1999), Swedish politician
- Axel Hamberg (1863–1933), Swedish mineralogist, geographer, explorer, photographer and professor of geography
- Axel Hampus Dalström (1829–1882), Finnish architect
- Axel Hansen (1899–1933), Danish cyclist
- Axel Henry Hansen (1887–1980), Norwegian gymnast
- Axel Härstedt (born 1987), Swedish discus thrower
- Axel Haverich (born 1953), German cardiac surgeon
- Axel Hedfors (aka Axwell, born 1977), Swedish DJ and musician
- Axel Hedenlund (1888–1919), Swedish track and field athlete
- Axel Heiberg (1848–1932), Norwegian diplomat and financier
- Axel Heiberg (1908–1988), Norwegian judge
- Axel Heiberg Stang (1904–1974), Norwegian politician, landowner and forester
- Axel C. Heitmann (born 1959), German business executive
- Axel Hellstrom (1893–1933), German muscle reader, mentalist and stage magician
- Axel Helsted (1847–1907), Danish painter
- Axel Nicolai Herlofson (1845–1910), Norwegian fraudster and criminal
- Axel Hervelle (born 1983), Belgian basketball player
- Axel Hilgenstöhler (born 1975), German record producer, mixing engineer and guitarist
- Axel Hirsoux (born 1982), Belgian singer
- Axel Høeg-Hansen (1877–1947), Danish architect
- Axel Högel (1884–1970), Swedish actor
- Axel Höjer (1890–1974), Swedish physician
- Axel Holmström (anarchist) (1881–1947), Swedish anarchist
- Axel Holmström (ice hockey) (born 1996), Swedish ice hockey player
- Axel Holst (1860–1931), Norwegian physician and professor of hygiene and bacteriology
- Axel Honneth (born 1949), German philosopher, theorist and professor
- Axel Horn (1913–2001), American artist
- Axel Hultgren (1886–1974), Swedish metallurgist
- Axel Hultman (1869–1935), Swedish actor
- Axel Hütte (born 1951), German photographer
- Axel Ingwersen (18??–19??), Danish sailor
- Axel Jang (born 1968), German bobsledder
- Axel Janse (1888–1973), Swedish gymnast
- Axel Jansson (sport shooter) (1882–1909), Swedish sport shooter
- Axel Jansson (1916–1968), Swedish politician
- Axel Jensen (1899–1968), Danish long-distance runner
- Axel Jensen (1932–2003), Norwegian author
- Axel P. Jensen (1885–1972), Danish landscape painter
- Axel Johansson (rower) (1885–1973), Swedish rower
- Axel Johansson (speed skater) (1910–1983), Swedish speed skater
- Axel Kacou (born 1995), Ivorian-French footballer
- Axel Kahn (1944–2021), French scientist and geneticist
- Axel Kassegger (born 1966), Austrian politician
- Axel Keller (born 1977), German footballer
- Axel Kicillof (born 1971), Argentine economist and politician
- Axel Kielland (1907–1963), journalist and playwright
- Axel Klinckowström (1867–1936), Swedish baron, zoologist, explorer, fiction writer and memoirist
- Axel Kober (born 1970), German conductor
- Axel Kock (1851–1935), Swedish philologist and professor of Scandinavian languages
- Axel Koenders (born 1959), Dutch triathlete
- Axel Köhler (born 1959), German countertenor and opera director
- Axel Kolle (born 1973), Norwegian footballer
- Axel Cédric Konan (born 1983), Ivorian footballer
- Axel Krause (born 1958), German painter and graphic artist
- Axel Kristiansson (1914–1999), Swedish politician
- Axel Kruse (born 1967), German footballer
- Axel Kühn (born 1967), German bobsledder
- Axel Kurck (1555–1630), Finnish warlord
- Axel Lapp (born 1966), German curator, art historian and publisher
- Axel Lawarée (born 1973), Belgian footballer
- Axel Leijonhufvud (1933–2022), Swedish economist and professor
- Axel Lerche (1903–1949), Danish sports shooter
- Axel Lesser (born 1946), German cross country skier
- Axel Lewenhaupt (1917–2018), Swedish diplomat
- Axel Liebmann (1849–1876), Danish composer
- Axel Lille (1848–1921), Finnish journalist and politician
- Axel Lillie (1603–1662), Swedish soldier and politician
- Axel Lindahl (photographer) (1841–1906), Swedish photographer
- Axel Lindstrom (1895–1940), Swedish baseball player
- Axel Ljung (1884–1938), Swedish gymnast and track and field athlete
- Axel Ljungdahl (1897–1995), Swedish Air Force general
- Aksel Lund Svindal, Norwegian alpine ski racer
- Axel Fredrik Londen (1859–1928), Finnish sports shooter
- Axel Louissaint (born 1996), Swiss basketball player
- Axel Løvenskiold (1912–1980), Norwegian landowner and painter
- Axel Löwen (1686–1773), Swedish nobleman and military officer
- Axel Mackenrott (born 1969), German heavy metal keyboardist (Masterplan)
- Axel Madsen (1930–2007), Danish-born American biographer and journalist
- Axel Malmgren (1857–1901), Swedish artist
- Axel Maraval (born 1993), French footballer
- Axel Matus (born 1998), Mexican racing driver
- Axel Maurer (1866–1925), Norwegian stagewriter, editor and theatre director
- Axel Maußen (born 1968), German Roman Catholic priest
- Axel Médéric (born 1970), French figure skater
- Axel Merckx (born 1972), Belgian cyclist
- Axel Méyé (born 1995), Gabonese footballer
- Axel Meyer (born 1960), German evolutionary biologist and professor of zoology
- Axel Michon (born 1990), French tennis player
- Axel Michaels (born 1949), German professor of classical Indology and religious studies
- Axel Milberg (born 1956), German actor
- Axel Miller (born 1965), Belgian businessman
- Axel Möller (1830–1896), Swedish astronomer
- Axel Otto Mörner (1774–1852), Swedish artist and military general
- Axel Mowat (1592–1661), Norwegian naval officer and land owner
- Axel Müller (disambiguation), several people
- Axel Munthe (1857–1949), Swedish physician and psychiatrist
- Axel Murswieck (born 19??), German political scientist, commentator and professor
- Axel Neff (born 1984), American businessman
- Axel Nepraunik (born 1945), Austrian sprinter
- Axel Neumann (born 1952), German footballer
- Axel Ngando (born 1993), French footballer
- Axel Nielsen (1902–1970), Danish astronomer
- Axel Noack (born 1961), German race walker
- Axel Nordgren (1828–1888), Swedish painter
- Axel Nordlander (1879–1962), Swedish military officer and equestrian
- Axel Norling (1884–1964), Swedish gymnast, diver, and tug of war competitor
- Axel Otto Normann (1884–1962), Norwegian journalist, newspaper editor, theatre critic and theatre director
- Axel Oberwelland (born 1966), German businessman
- Axel Ockenfels (born 1969), German economist and professor
- Axel Odelberg (1873–1950), Swedish chemical engineer
- Axel Ohlin (1867–1903), Swedish zoologist and Arctic and Antarctic explorer
- Axel Olrik (1864–1917), Danish folklorist and scholar of medieval historiography
- Axel Orrström (born 1986), Finnish footballer
- Axel Ottosson (born 1996), Swedish ice hockey player
- Axel Oxenstierna (1583–1654) Swedish statesman
- Axel Palmgren (1867–1939), Finnish lawyer, civil servant, business executive and politician
- Axel Paulsen (1855–1938), Norwegian figure skater and speed skater
- Axel Pehrsson-Bramstorp (1883–1954), Swedish politician and former Prime Minister of Sweden
- Axel Rudi Pell (born 1960), German heavy metal guitarist
- Axel Perneczky (1945–2009), Hungarian neurosurgeon
- Axel Persson (1888–1955), Swedish cyclist
- Axel W. Persson (1888–1951), Swedish archaeologist
- Axel Peschel (born 1942), German cyclist
- Axel Petersen (1880–1962) Danish track and field athlete
- Axel Petersen (1887–1968), Danish footballer
- Axel Jacob Petersson (1834–1884), Swedish-Norwegian structural engineer and inventor
- Axel Petersson Döderhultarn (1868–1925), Swedish wood carver
- Axel Pilmark (1925–2009), Danish footballer
- Axel Poignant (1906–1986), Australian photographer
- Axel Poniatowski (born 1951), French politician
- Axel Pons (born 1991), Spanish Grand Prix motorcycle racer and model
- Axel Poulsen (1887–1972), Danish sculptor
- Axel Prahl (born 1960), German actor
- Axel Preisler (1871–1930), Danish architect
- Axel Pretzsch (born 1976), German tennis player
- Axel Proet Høst (1907–1985), Norwegian sports official
- Axel Rappe (1838–1918), Swedish Army general
- Axel Rappe (1884–1945), Swedish Army major general
- Axel Rauschenbach (born 1967), German pair skater
- Axel Revold (1887–1962), Norwegian painter, illustrator and art professor
- Axel Reymond (born 1994), French marathon swimmer
- Axel Ringvall (1860–1927), Swedish actor and comedian
- Axel Ripke (1880–1937), German journalist and politician
- Axel Rodrigues de Arruda (born 1970), Brazilian footballer
- Axel Romdahl (1880–1951), Swedish art historian and museum curator
- Axel Roos (born 1964), German footballer and coach
- Axl Rose (born 1962), Lead vocalist of the American hard rock band Guns N' Roses
- Axel Rosenkrantz (1670–1723), Norwegian landowner and baron
- Axel Roth (1936–2008), German-born American NASA engineer
- Axel Rubbestad (1888–1961), Swedish politician
- Axel Runström (1883–1943), Swedish water polo player and diver
- Axel Ryding (1831–1897), Swedish Army lieutenant general
- Axel Salzmann (born 1950), German pair skater
- Axel Schulz (born 1968), German boxer
- Axel Schulz (born 1959), German footballer
- Axel Seeberg (1931–2011), Norwegian archaeologist
- Axel Siefer (born 1950), German actor
- Axel Simonsen (1887–1938), Norwegian long-distance runner
- Axel Sjöberg (footballer, born 1991) (born 1991), Swedish footballer
- Axel Sjöblad (born 1967), Swedish handball player
- Axel Sjöblom (1882–1951), Swedish gymnast
- Axel Skovgaard (1875–19??), Danish-born American violinist
- Axel Smeets (born 1974), Belgian footballer and manager
- Axel Smith (topographer) (1744–1823), Norwegian priest and topographer
- Axel Smith (chess player) (born 1986), Swedish chess player
- Axel Christian Rosenkrantz Smith (1856–1935), Norwegian parliamentary representative
- Axel Sømme (1899–1991), Norwegian geographer, political activist, magazine and newspaper editor
- Axel Springer (1912–1985), German publisher
- Axel Ståhle (1891–1987), Swedish Army officer and equestrian
- Axel Stawski (born 1950), American real estate developer and investor
- Axel Stein (born 1982), German actor
- Axel Stoll (1948–2014), German geophysicist and conspiracy theorist
- Axel Stordahl (1913–1963), American composer and arranger
- Axel Strand (1893–1983), Swedish trade union organizer
- Axel Strauss (born 19??), German violinist music professor
- Axel Strøbye (1928–2005), Danish actor
- Axel Strøm (1901–1985), Norwegian physician
- Axel Sundermann (born 1968), German former footballer
- Axel Sundquist (1867–1910), American sailor
- Axel Svendsen (1912–1995), Danish canoeist
- Axel Sveinsson (1896–1957), Icelandic civil engineer
- Axel Tallberg (1860–1928), Swedish visual artist and engraver
- Axel Teichmann (born 1979), German cross-country skier
- Axel Tetens (1892–1961), Danish wrestler
- Axel Thallaug (1866–1938), Norwegian lawyer and politician
- Axel Thayssen (1885–1952), Danish tennis player
- Axel Tony (born 1984), French singer
- Axel Törneman (1880–1925), Swedish painter
- Axel Toupane (born 1992), French basketball player
- Axel Troost (1954–2023), German economist and politician
- Axel Tuanzebe (born 1997), Congolese-born British footballer
- Axel Ullrich (born 1943), German biologist, oncologist and cancer researcher
- Axel Urup (1601–1671), Danish military engineer and commander and judge
- Axel Vennersten (1863–1948), Swedish politician
- Axel Villanueva (born 1989), Nicaraguan footballer
- Axel Vogt (1849–1921), American railroad mechanical engineer
- Axel von Blomberg (1908–1941), German Air Force officer
- Axel von Harnack (1895–1974), German librarian, historian and philologist
- Axel Voss (born 1963), German politician
- Axel Wachtmeister, Count of Mälsåker (1643–1699), Swedish count and field marshal
- Axel Wahlstedt (1867–1943), Swedish sports shooter
- Axel Wallengren (1865–1896), Swedish author, poet, and journalist
- Axel A. Weber (born 1957), German economist, professor and banker
- Axel Weber (1954–2001), German pole vaulter
- Axel Wegner (born 1963), German sports shooter
- Axel Welin (1862–1951), Swedish inventor and industrialist
- Axel Wenner-Gren (1881–1961), Swedish entrepreneur
- Axel Werner (born 1996), Argentine footballer
- Axel Westermark (1875–1911), American sailor
- Axel Wibrån (born 1985), Swedish footballer
- Axel Wieandt (born 1966), German businessman
- Axel Wikström (1907–1976), Swedish cross-country skier
- Axel Williams (born 1983), Tahitian footballer
- Axel Willner (aka The Field, born 19??), Swedish electronic musician
- Axel Witsel (born 1989), Belgian footballer
- Axel Wittke (born 1960), German footballer
- Axel Zeebroek (born 1978), Belgian triathlete
- Axel Zitzmann (born 1959), German ski jumper
- Axel Zwingenberger (born 1955), German blues and boogie-woogie pianist

=== Fictional characters ===
- Akseli Koskela, in the Finnish novel Täällä Pohjantähden alla by Väinö Linna
- Axel, a Belgian steam locomotive in the film Thomas & Friends: The Great Race
- Axel, a raccoon character in the 2020s animated television series Pikwik Pack
- Axel, a grasshopper in the 1998 animated film A Bug's Life
- Axel (Kingdom Hearts), a character in the Kingdom Hearts video game series
- Axel, a character in the Crazy Taxi video game series
- Axel, a main character in the video game Minecraft Story Mode
- Axel, a protagonist in Jules Verne's A Journey to the Center of the Earth
- Axel, a character in the book The Bane Chronicles by Cassandra Clare
- Axel, in the film My Bloody Valentine
- Axel (The Walking Dead), a former prisoner and member of the group of survivors on the TV series The Walking Dead
- Axel the Water Buffalo, a villain in the Sonic the Hedgehog comic
- Axel Blaze, the English name for Gouenji Shuuya, a main character in the manga and anime Inazuma Eleven
- Axel the Dark Hero, a character in the Disgaea video game series
- Axel Foley, the title character in the Beverly Hills Cop films
- Axel Freed, the main character in the film The Gambler
- Axel Hawk, a character in the video game series Fatal Fury
- Axel Jordache, in the novel Rich Man, Poor Man: the father of the novel's three central characters
- Axel Miller, in the American-Canadian TV series Van Helsing
- Axel Mulligan, the main character in Power Players
- Axel Rex, in Vladimir Nabokov's novel Laughter in the Dark
- Axel Steel, in the Guitar Hero video game series
- Axel Stone, a character in the Streets of Rage video game series
- Axel Thurston, in the anime series Eureka Seven
- Axel Walker, the second character known as Trickster in the DC Comics universe
- Axl, a protagonist in Kazuo Ishiguro's The Buried Giant
- Axl (Mega Man X), a character in the Mega Man X series
- Axl, a character in the series Nexo Knights
- Axl Heck, in the TV series The Middle
- Axl Low, a character in the Guilty Gear series of fighting games

== As a surname ==
- Curtis Axel (born 1979), ring name of American professional wrestler Joseph Curtis Hennig
- Gabriel Axel (1918–2014), Danish filmmaker
- Richard Axel (born 1946), American scientist

== See also ==
- Axelrod
