= Mirabaud =

Mirabaud may refer to:

- Mirabaud Group, international banking and financial group based in Geneva, Switzerland
- Jean-Baptiste de Mirabaud (1675–1760), French writer and translator
- Paul Mirabaud (c.1848-1908), French banker and philatelist
