= Axel Axelsson =

Axel Axelsson may refer to:

- Axel Axelsson (handballer) (born 1951), Icelandic former handball player
- Axel Axelsson (footballer) (born 1942), Icelandic former footballer
