= Kabou (surname) =

Kabou is a surname. Notable people with the surname include:

- Axelle Kabou (born 1955), Cameroonian journalist and author
- Fabienne Kabou (born 1977), Senegalese-French convicted murderer
- Rafik Kabou (born 1992), Tunisian footballer
