= Paul Mirabaud =

French banker and philatelist

Paul Barthelemy Mirabaud
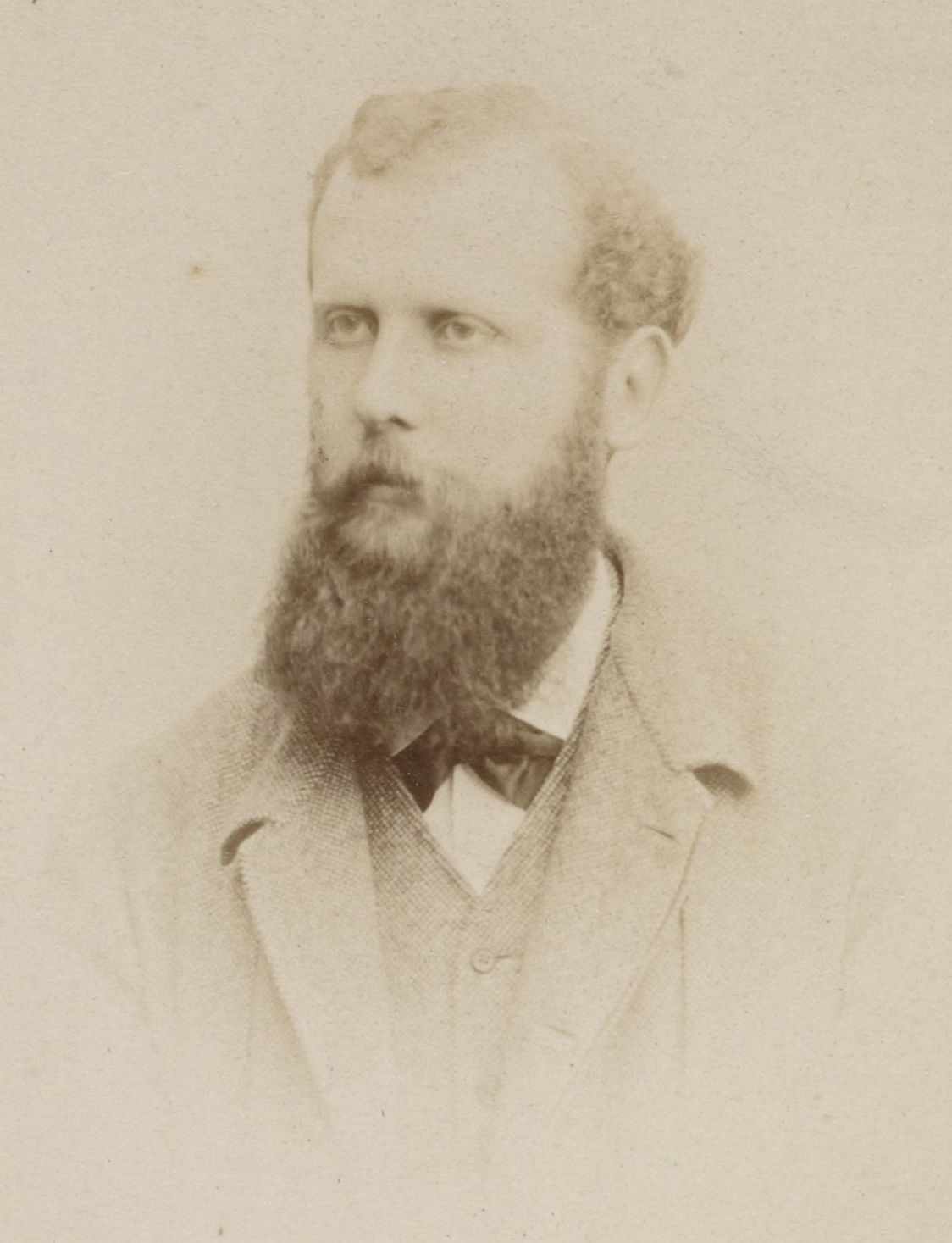
- Born: 29 June 1848; Versailles, France
- Died: 12 May 1905 (aged 56); Paris, France
- Occupations: Banker; philatelist

Paul Barthélemy Mirabaud (29 June 1848 – 12 May 1908) was a French banker and philatelist from Versailles, Yvelines who was a specialist in the stamps of Switzerland.

In 1921, he was one of the "Fathers of Philately" entered on the Roll of Distinguished Philatelists. Together with Swedish-born Baron Axel de Reuterskiöld he wrote Les Timbres Postes de la Suisse 1843-1860 which was published in 1899. The book is considered well-researched and the first published deep study of Swiss philately. The book is still considered a standard reference and has been the basis for many more modern or more particular enquiries into the field of the Swiss classical issues.

== Biography ==
Grandson of Jacques Mirabaud, son of Henry Mirabaud and Denise Adélaïde Paccard, himself a managing partner of the family banking firm Mirabaud Group, he was regent of the Banque de France from 1907 until his death, president of the Société des Chargeurs Réunis, vice-president of the Compagnie des phosphates de Gafsa, director of the Compagnie du Chemin de Fer de Paris à Orléans, the Compagnie du Canal de Suez, Mines de Soumah et Tafna, Société Mokta El Hadid, Mines de Boléo, Compagnie Algérienne, Chemins de fer de l'État argentin, and Compagnie des houillères et du chemin de fer d'Épinac. He was involved in founding the Société française de reports et de dépôts et de Peñarroya in 1881, the Compagnie Le Nickel in 1880 , and the Mines de Bor in 1904.

Paul Mirabaud is also known for having invited Marcel Proust on a cruise between Dinard and Guernsey in August 1904 on his yacht, the Hélène.

He was a member of the diaconate of the Reformed Church of the Holy Spirit on Rue Roquépine(Paris), where he was buried on May 16, 1908. In May 1909, part of his stamp collection was put up for sale at the Drouot auction house.

He married Hélène Dollfus, daughter of Charles Dollfus and Émilie Galline, on January 8, 1872, in Mulhouse. His daughter Jeanne married diplomat Robert de Billy.
