= Aksel =

- Gender: Masculine
- Name day: 23 March (Estonia); 30 October (Norway, Faroe Islands)

Origin
- Region of origin: Scandinavia

Other names
- Related names: Axel

Aksel is a masculine name, used predominantly throughout Scandinavia, a variant of Axel.

People with the name include:

- Aksel Agerby (1889–1942), Danish composer, organist, and music administrator
- Aksel Airo (1898–1985), Finnish lieutenant general and main strategic planner
- Aksel Andersen (1912–1977), Danish-American organist and composer and organ professor and examinist
- Aksel Frederik Andersen (1891–1972), Danish mathematician
- Aksel Arstal (1855–1940), Norwegian theologist, schoolteacher and geographer
- Aksel Bender Madsen (1916–2000), Danish furniture designer
- Aksel Berg (1893–1979), Soviet scientist and Navy Admiral (in Engineering)
- Aksel Berget Skjølsvik (born 1987), Norwegian professional football player
- Aksel Bonde (1918–1996), Danish rower who competed in the 1948 Summer Olympics
- Aksel Brehm (1889-?), Estonian politician
- Aksel C. Wiin-Nielsen (1924–2010), Danish professor of meteorology at University of Copenhagen
- Aksel Duun (1921–1987), Danish sprint canoeist who competed in the late 1950s
- Aksel Fossen (1919–2009), Norwegian politician for the Labour Party
- Aksel Gresvig (1876–1958), Norwegian track cyclist, sports administrator and businessman
- Aksel Gürcan Demirtaş (born 1973), Turkish track and field athlete
- Aksel Hagen (born 1953), Norwegian politician and member of the Storting
- Aksel Hennie (born 1975), Norwegian actor, director and writer
- Aksel Hansen (1853–1933), Danish sculptor
- Kaj Aksel Hansen (1917–1987), Danish footballer and manager
- Aksel Jacobsen Bogdanoff (1922–1971, Norwegian communist and one of the last generations on Lille Ekkerøy
- Aksel V. Johannesen (born 1972), Faroese lawyer and politician
- Aksel Kallas (1890–1922), Estonian politician
- Aksel Kankaanranta (born 1998), Finnish singer who would've represented Finland in the Eurovision Song Contest 2020
- Aksel Kipper (1907–1984), Estonian astrophysicist and academician
- Aksel Kuuse (1913–1942), Estonian track and field athlete
- Aksel Larsen (1897–1972), Danish politician who was chairman of the Communist Party of Denmark
- Aksel Lund Svindal (born 1982), Norwegian alpine skier
- Aksel Lydersen (1919–1995), Norwegian engineer and professor of chemical engineering
- Aksel Madsen (1899–1988), Danish long-distance runner
- Aksel Magdahl (born 1979), Norwegian navigator
- Aksel Mark (1913–2014), Estonian politician, journalist, newspaper editor and agronomist
- Aksel Mikkelsen (1849–1929), Danish educator
- Aksel Møller (1906–1958), Danish politician
- Aksel Nielsen (1901–1984), Danish-born American philanthropist, founder of the Mortgage Banking Association's School of Mortgage Banking
- Aksel Nõmmela (born 1994), Estonian cyclist
- Aksel Orav (1929–2003), Estonian actor
- Aksel Herman Rüütli (1893–1976), Estonian politician
- Aksel Sørensen (1891–1955), Danish gymnast who competed in the 1912 Summer Olympics
- Aksel Sandemose (1899–1965), novelist, born in Nykøbing, Mors Island, Denmark
- Aksel Schiøtz (1906–1975), Danish tenor and Lieder singer
- Aksel Vartanyan (born 1938), Soviet and Russian journalist and sports historian
- Aksel C. Wiin-Nielsen (1924–2010), Danish meteorologist and professor of meteorology
- Aksel Zachariassen (1898–1987), Norwegian politician, newspaper editor, secretary and writer
