= Axelle =

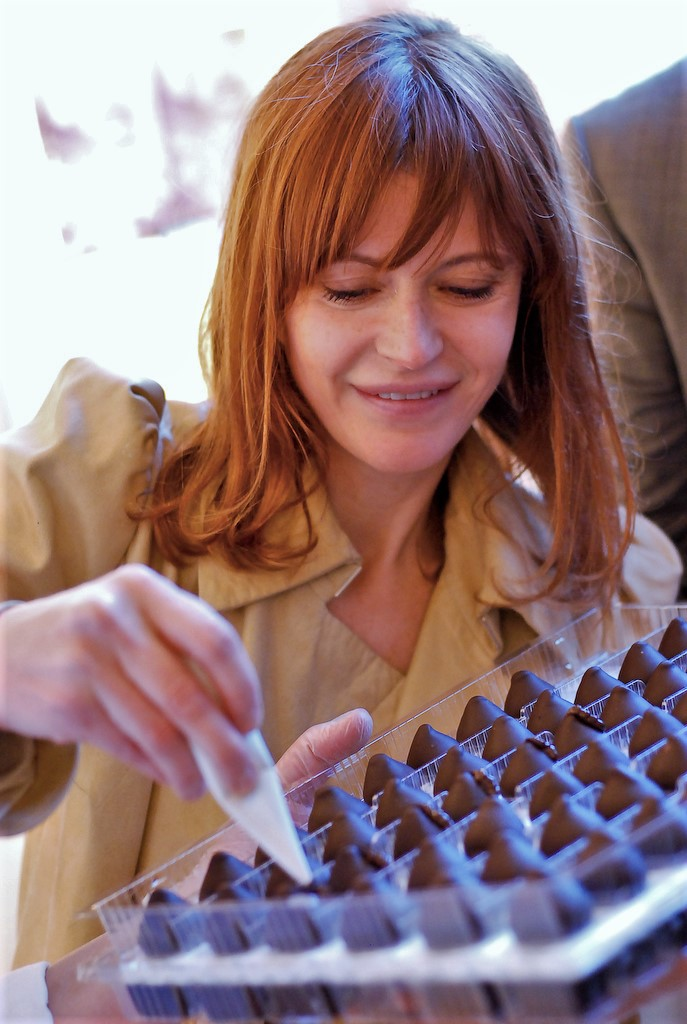
- Belgian singer-songwriter Axelle Red
- Language: French

Other names
- Variant form: Axel

Axelle is a French language feminine given name, a derivative of the Scandinavian name Axel. Notable people with the name include:

- Axelle Axell (born 1937), Swedish actress
- Axelle Carolyn (born 1979), Belgian filmmaker
- Axelle Crevier (born 1997), Canadian water polo player
- Axelle Dauwens (born 1990), Belgian athlete
- Axelle Étienne (born 1998), French cyclist
- Axelle Kabou (born 1955), Cameroonian journalist
- Axelle Klinckaert (born 2000), Belgian gymnast
- Axelle Laffont (born 1970), French actress and comedian
- Axelle Lemaire (born 1974), French politician
- Axelle Mollaret (born 1992), French skyrunner and ski mountaineer
- Axelle Red (born 1968), Belgian singer-songwriter
- Axelle Renoir (born 1969), French singer and composer

== See also ==
- Axel (disambiguation)
