= Firsoff (Martian crater) =

Crater on Mars

Firsoff Crater
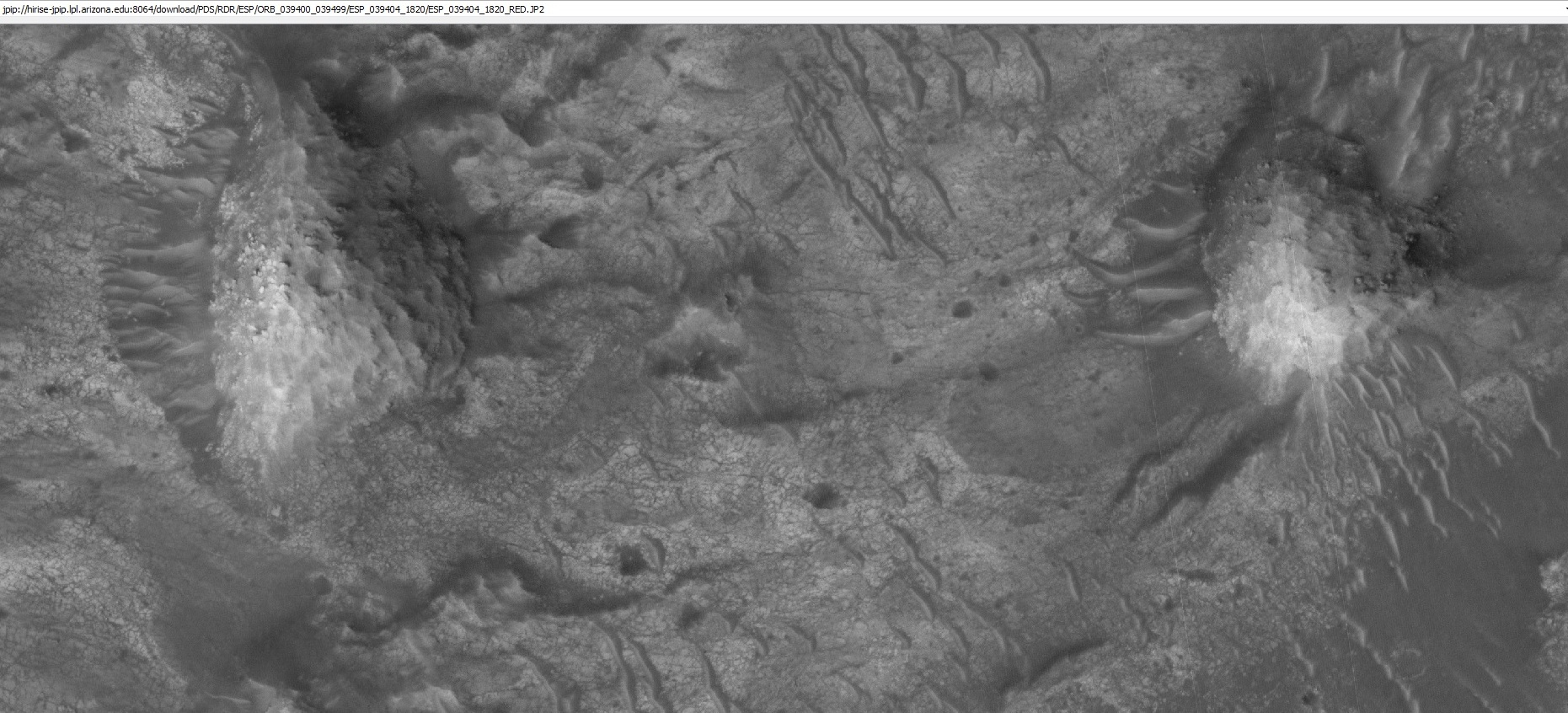
- Mounds from floor of Firsoff, as seen by HiRISE under HiWish program. Mound on the left has a pit at the top. Mounds like this are believed to have formed from water coming out of the pit.
- Planet: Mars
- Coordinates: 2.66°N 9.42°W
- Quadrangle: Oxia Palus
- Diameter: 90 km
- Eponym: Axel Firsoff, Swedish born British amateur astronomer

Firsoff is an impact crater in the region called Meridiani Planum in the Oxia Palus quadrangle of Mars, located at 2.66°N latitude and 9.42°W longitude. It is 90 km in diameter. It was named after British astronomer Axel Firsoff, and the name was approved in 2010.

Parts of the crater display many layers, as do some of the other craters in the region. Many places on Mars show rocks arranged in layers. Rock can form layers in a variety of ways. Volcanoes, wind, or water can produce layers. There is much evidence that at least some of the layers seen on Mars especially in Firsoff crater involve groundwater.

There are mounds in the crater that may have formed from springs. They show breccia sometimes a pit at the top. Some of the mounds are lined up along straight fractures. The mound's composition and shape suggest water came out of the mounds and then minerals were precipitated.

A detailed discussion of layering with many Martian examples can be found in Sedimentary Geology of Mars.

At a conference in May 2014, Firsoff Crater was picked to be one of 26 locations being considered for the 2020 Rover. Some of the layers in the crater contain sulfates which have a good chance of preserving traces of life. This Rover will look for signs of life and gather samples for return to Earth in another mission. A microscope will look for cells and other signs of life. It will also test a device to extract oxygen from the carbon-dioxide atmosphere of Mars. This is a technology needed for future human exploration.

== Gallery ==
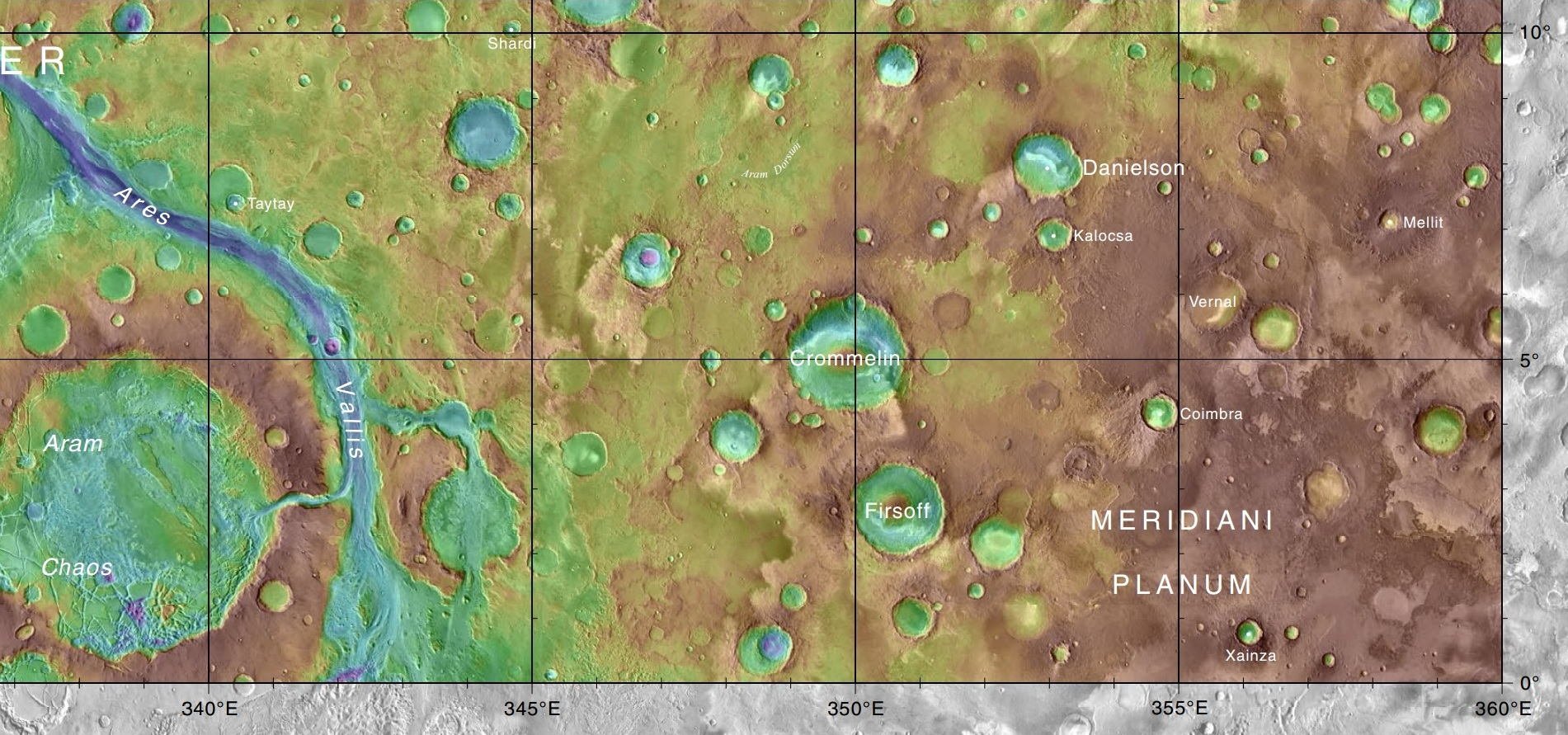
MOLA map showing Firsoff Crater and other nearby craters. Colors indicate elevations.

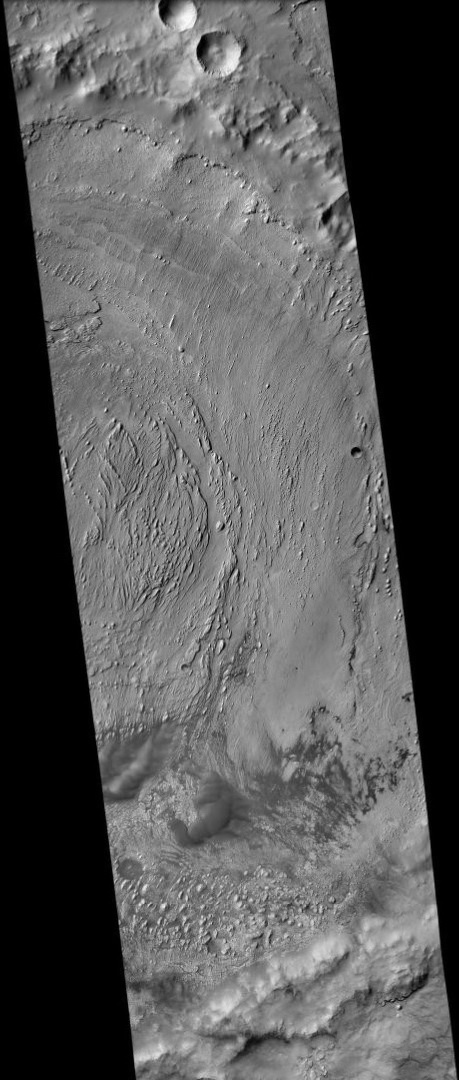
Firsoff Crater, as seen by CTX camera (on Mars Reconnaissance Orbiter).

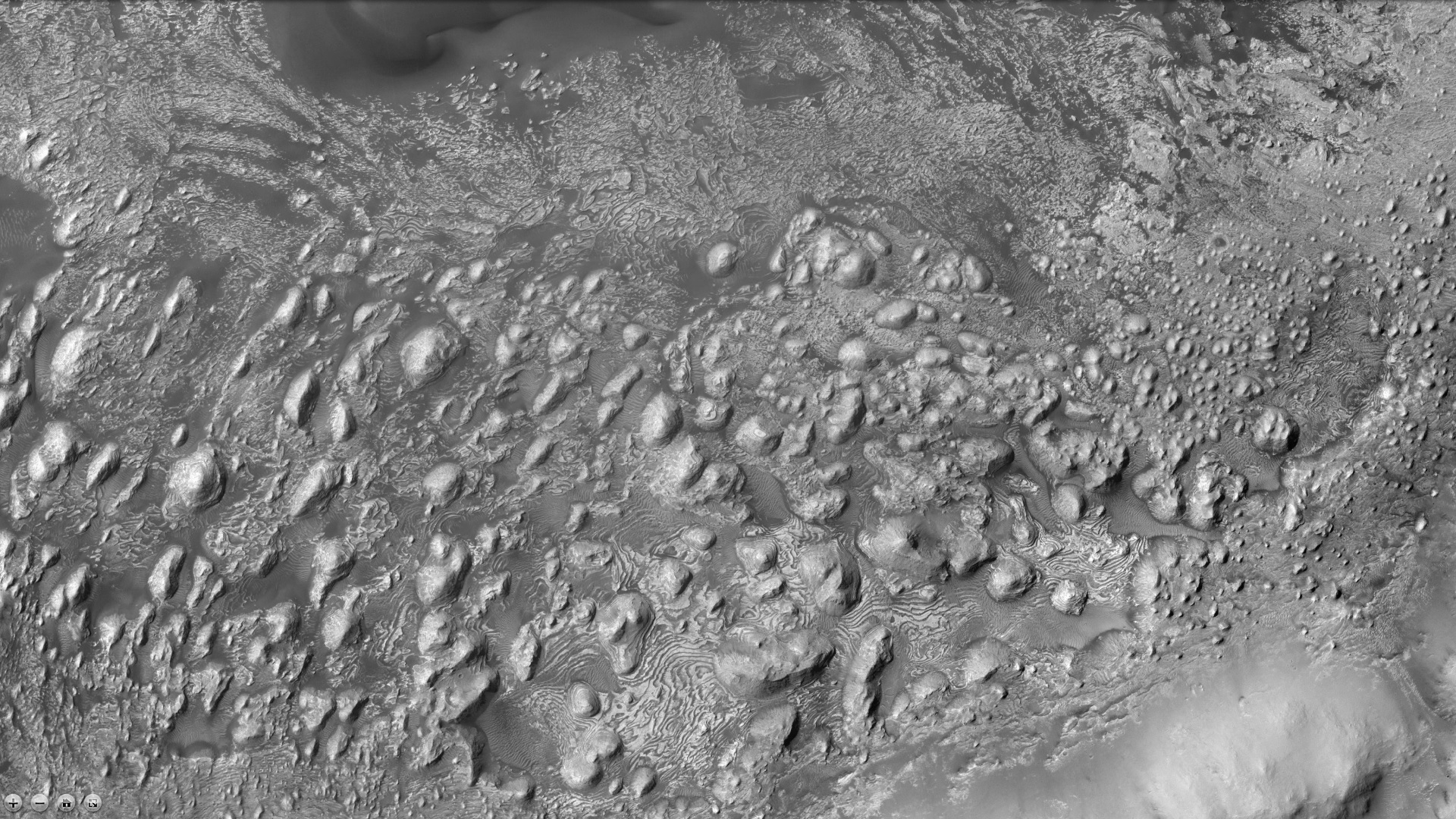
Close-up of southern part of Firsoff Crater showing layers, as seen by CTX camera (on Mars Reconnaissance Orbiter). Note: this is an enlargement of the previous image of Firsoff Crater.

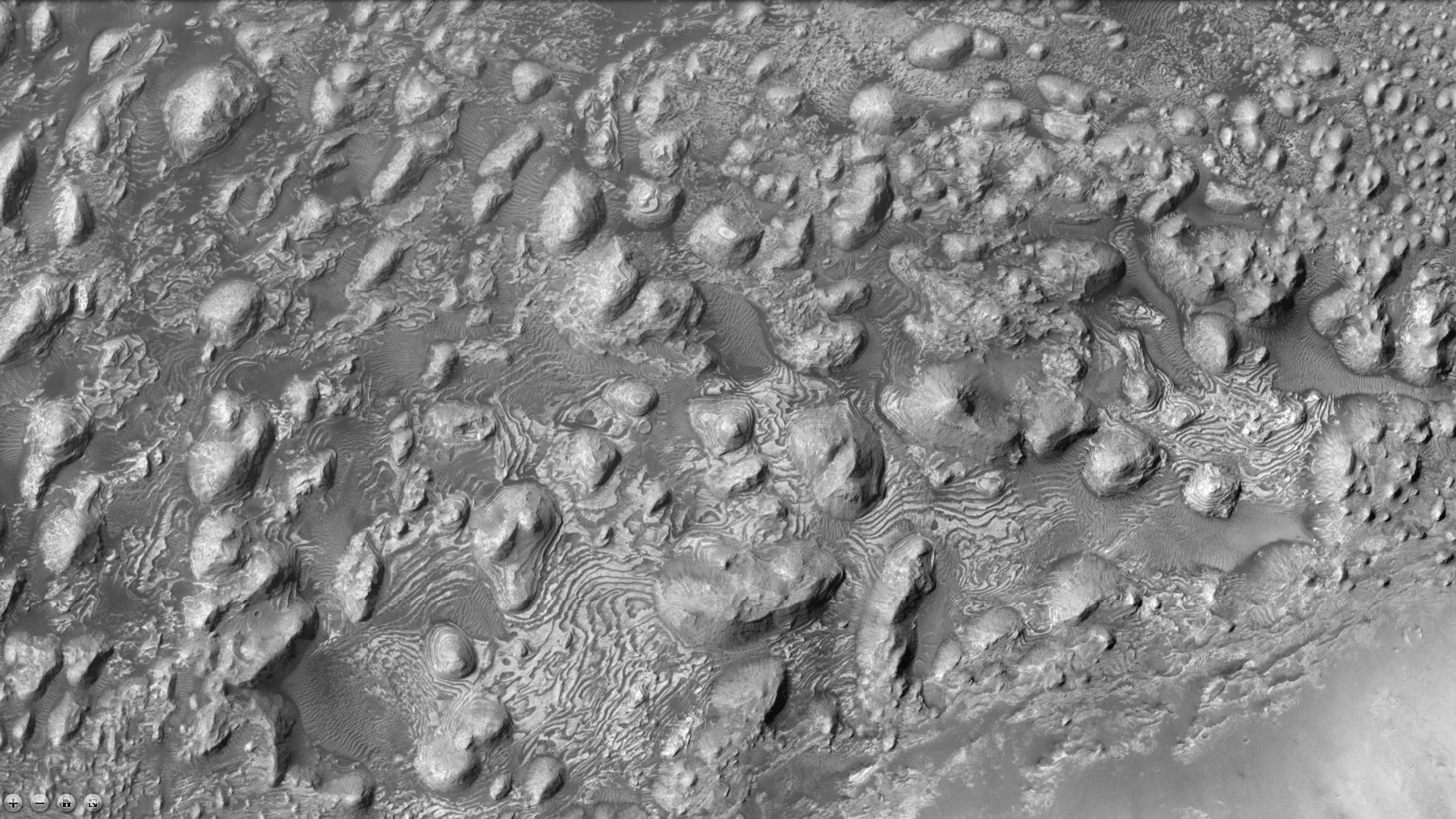
Closer up view of southern part of Firsoff Crater showing layers, as seen by CTX camera (on Mars Reconnaissance Orbiter). Note: this is an enlargement of the previous image of Firsoff Crater.

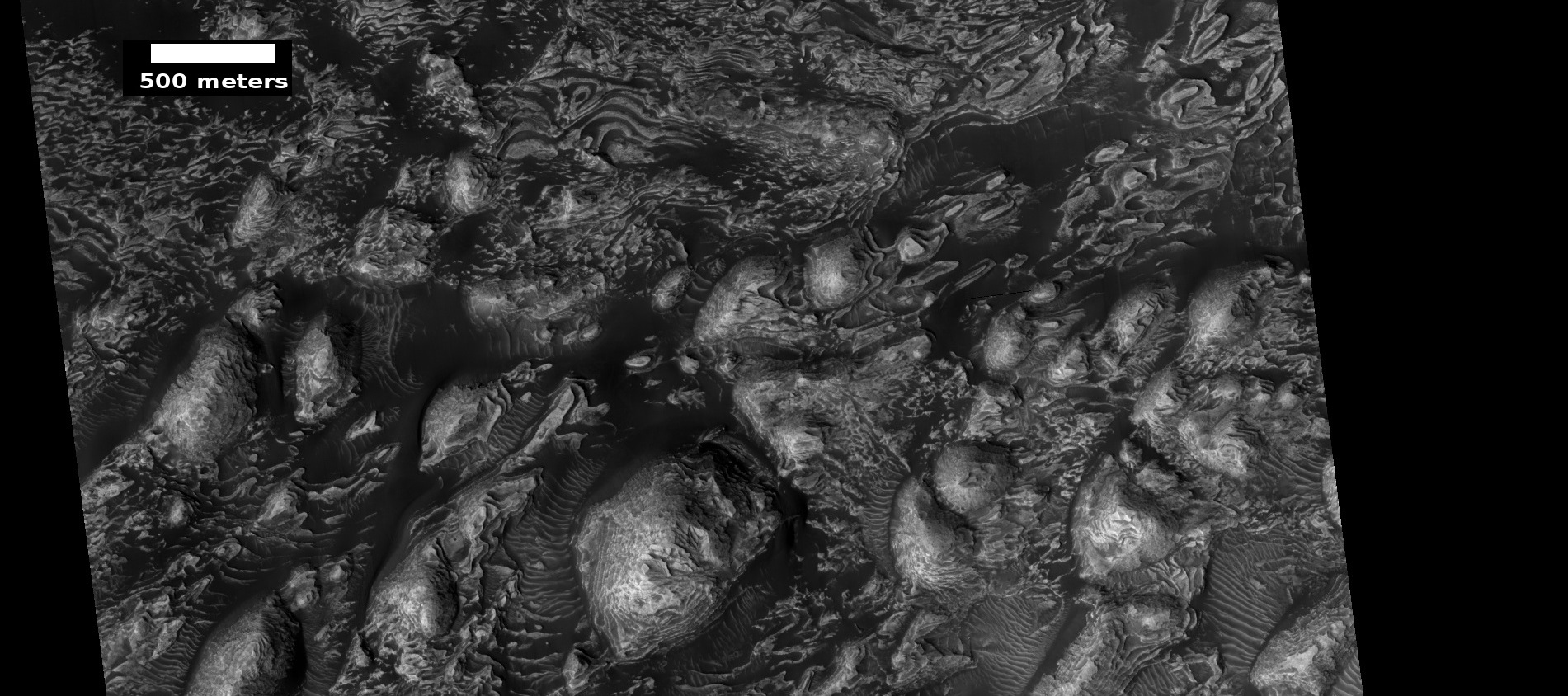
Layers in Firsoff Crater, as seen by HiRISE under HiWish program Note: this image field can be found in the previous image of the layers in Firsoff Crater, as seen by CTX camera (on Mars Reconnaissance Orbiter).

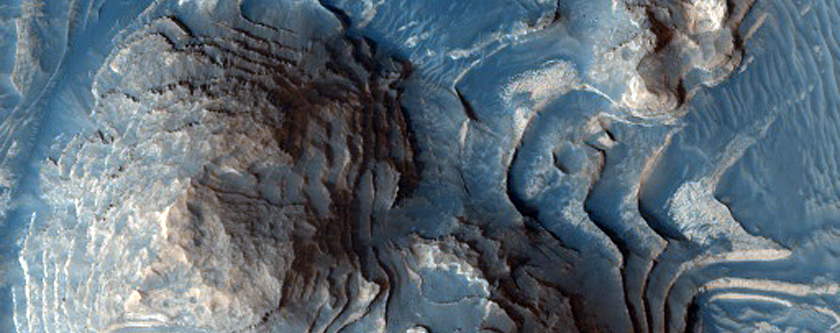
Close-up of layers in Firsoff Crater, as seen by HiRISE Note: this is an enlargement of the previous image of Firsoff Crater.

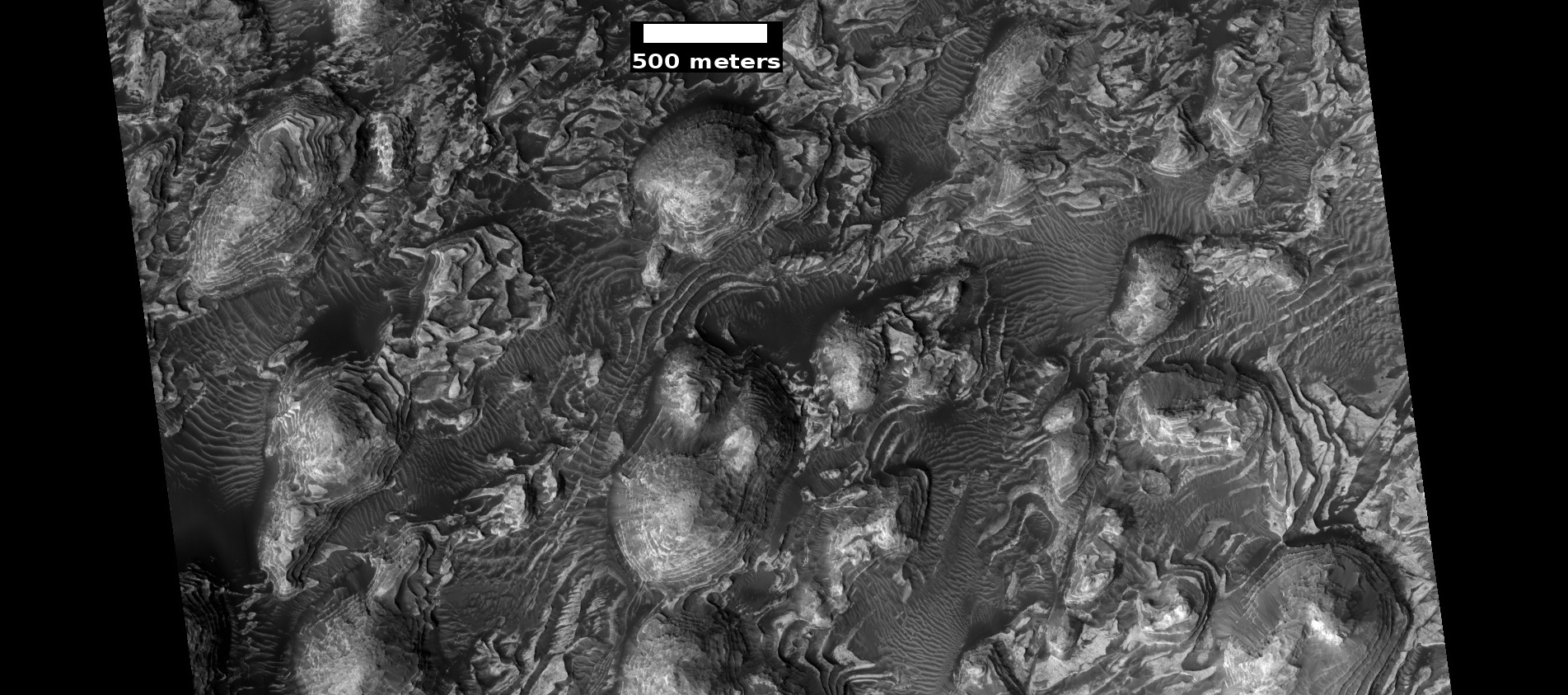
Top part of previous images, as seen by HiRISE Note: dark parts are basalt sand.

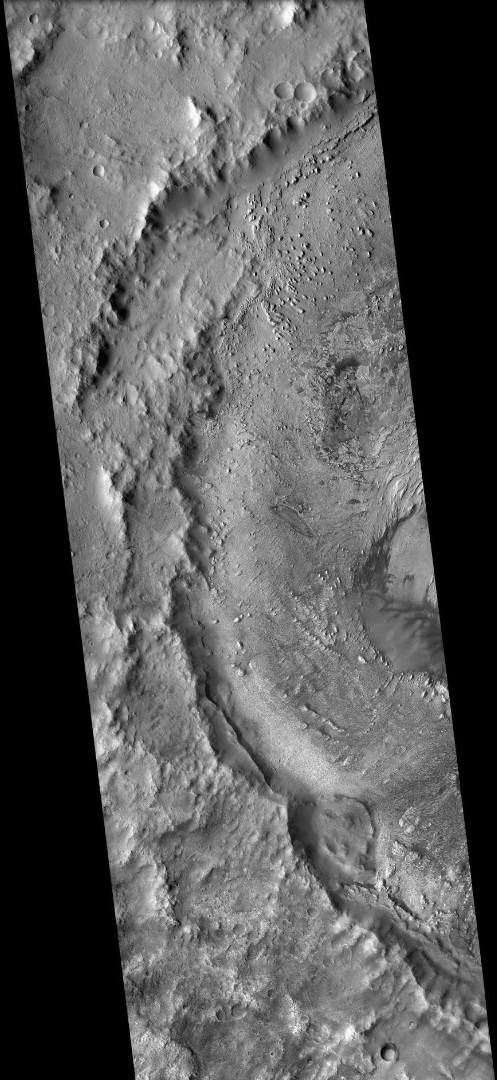
Western side of Firsoff Crater, as seen by CTX camera (on Mars Reconnaissance Orbiter).

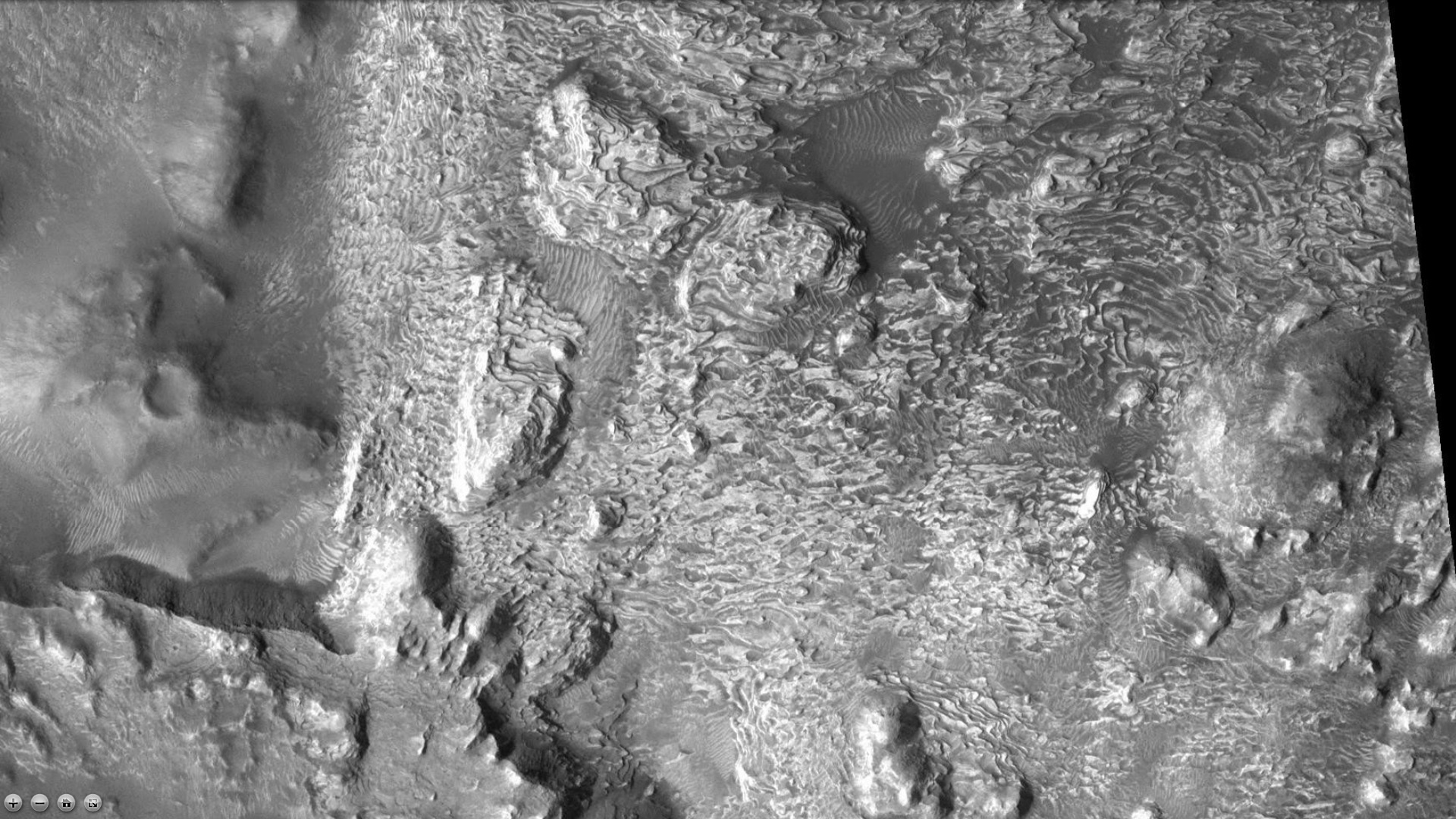
Layers on floor of western side of Firsoff Crater, as seen by CTX camera (on Mars Reconnaissance Orbiter). Note: this is an enlargement of the previous image of the western side of Firsoff Crater.

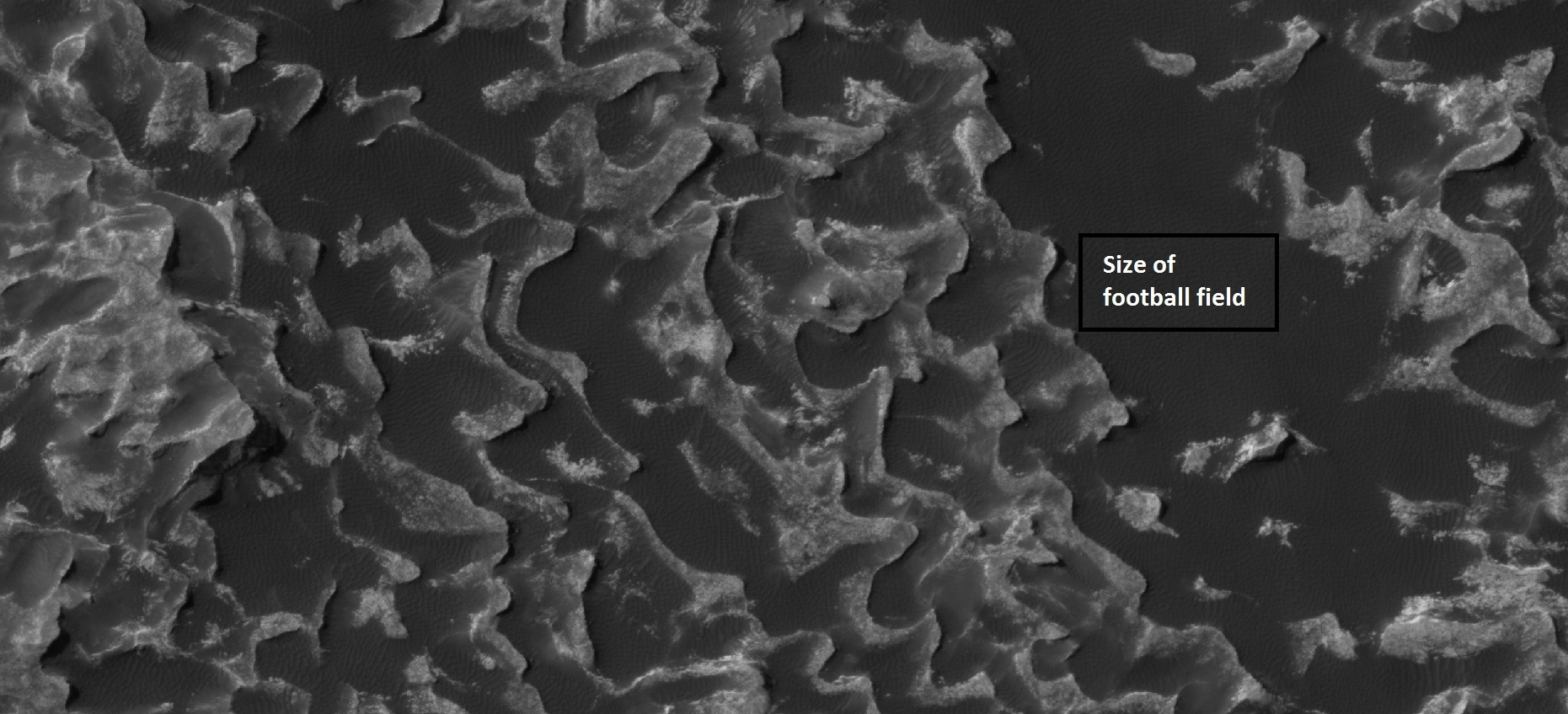
Layers in Firsoff Crater, as seen by HiRISE under HiWish program. Box shows size of football field.

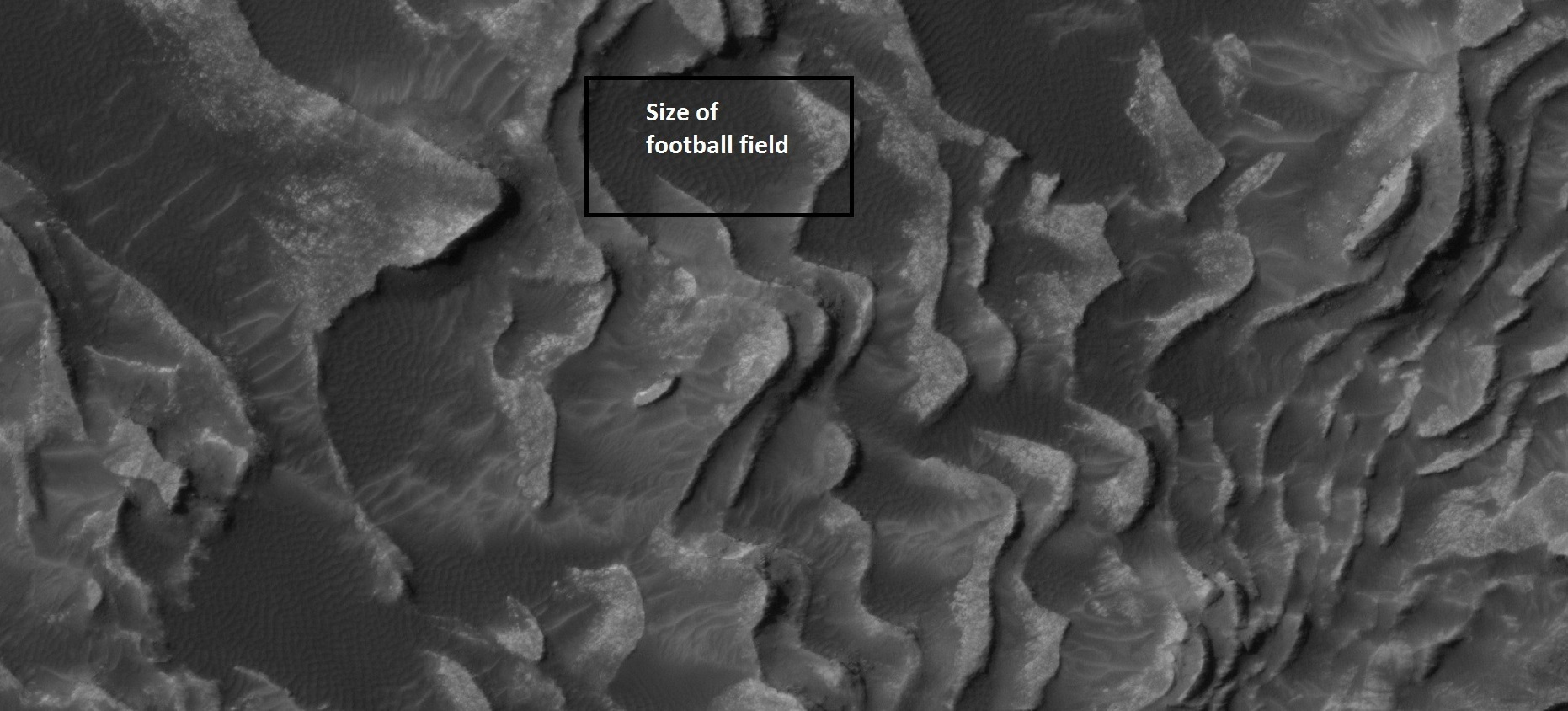
Close up view of layers in Firsoff Crater, as seen by HiRISE under HiWish program. Box shows size of football field.

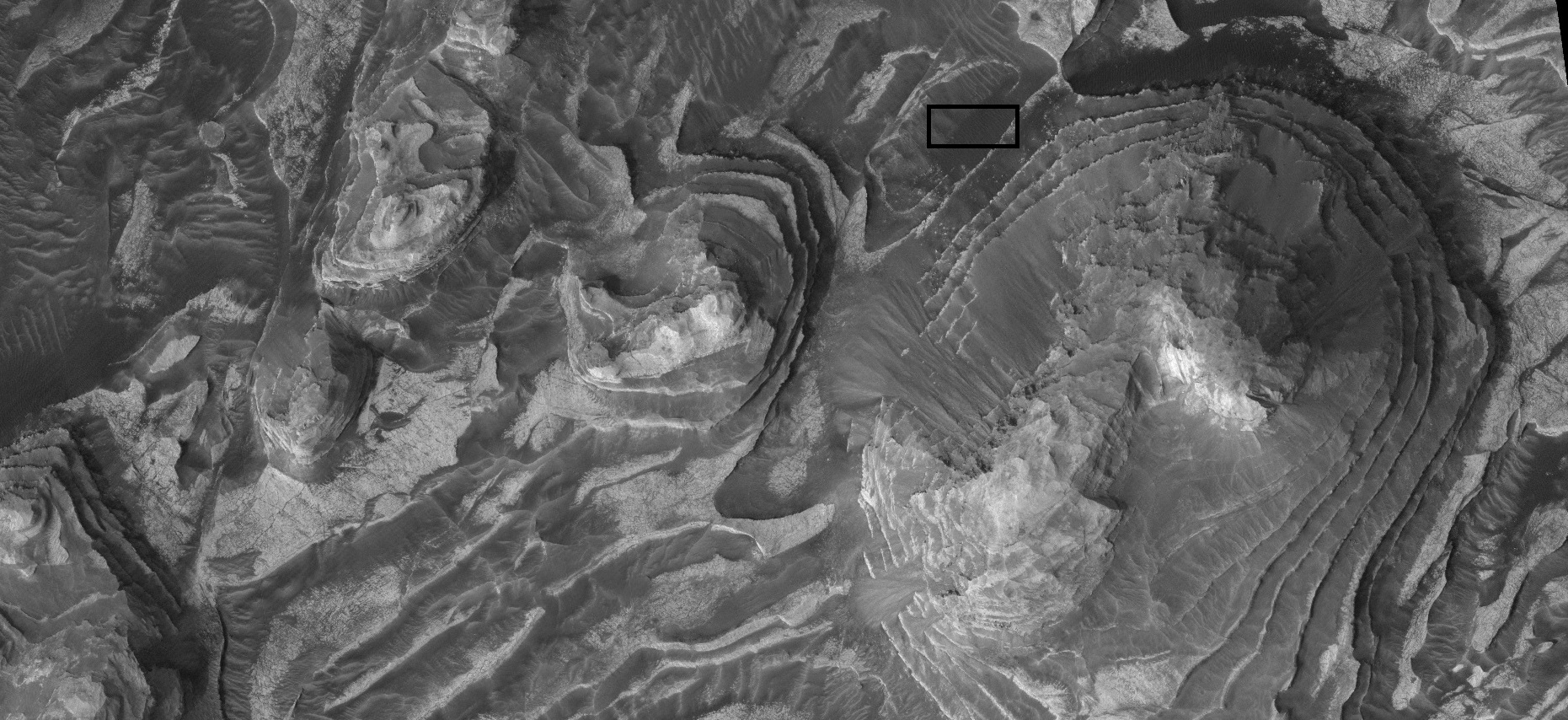
Layers in Firsoff crater with a box showing the size of a football field Picture taken by HiRISE under HiWish program.

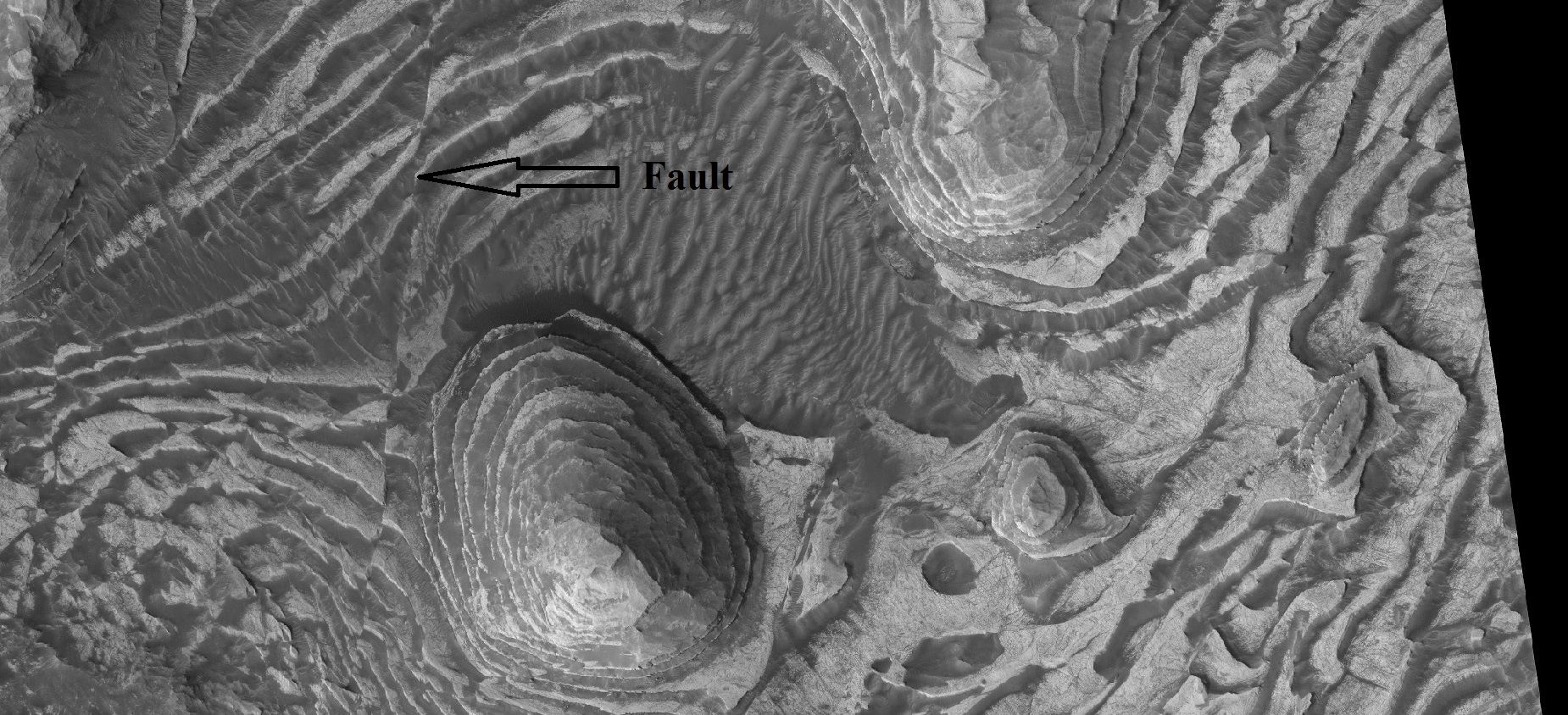
Layers and faults in Firsoff Crater, as seen by HiRISE under HiWish program. Arrows show one large fault, but there are other smaller ones in the picture.

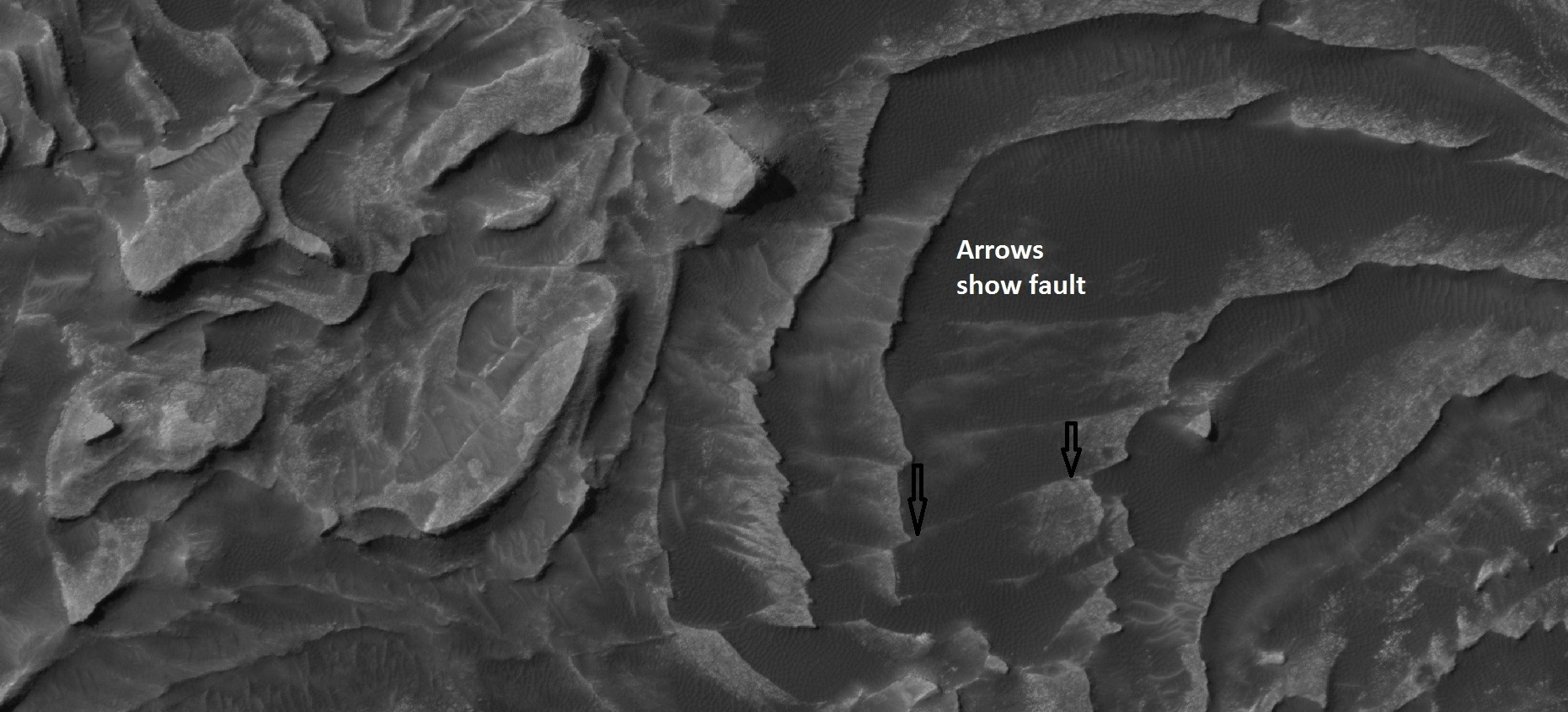
Faults and layers in Firsoff Crater, as seen by HiRISE under HiWish program.

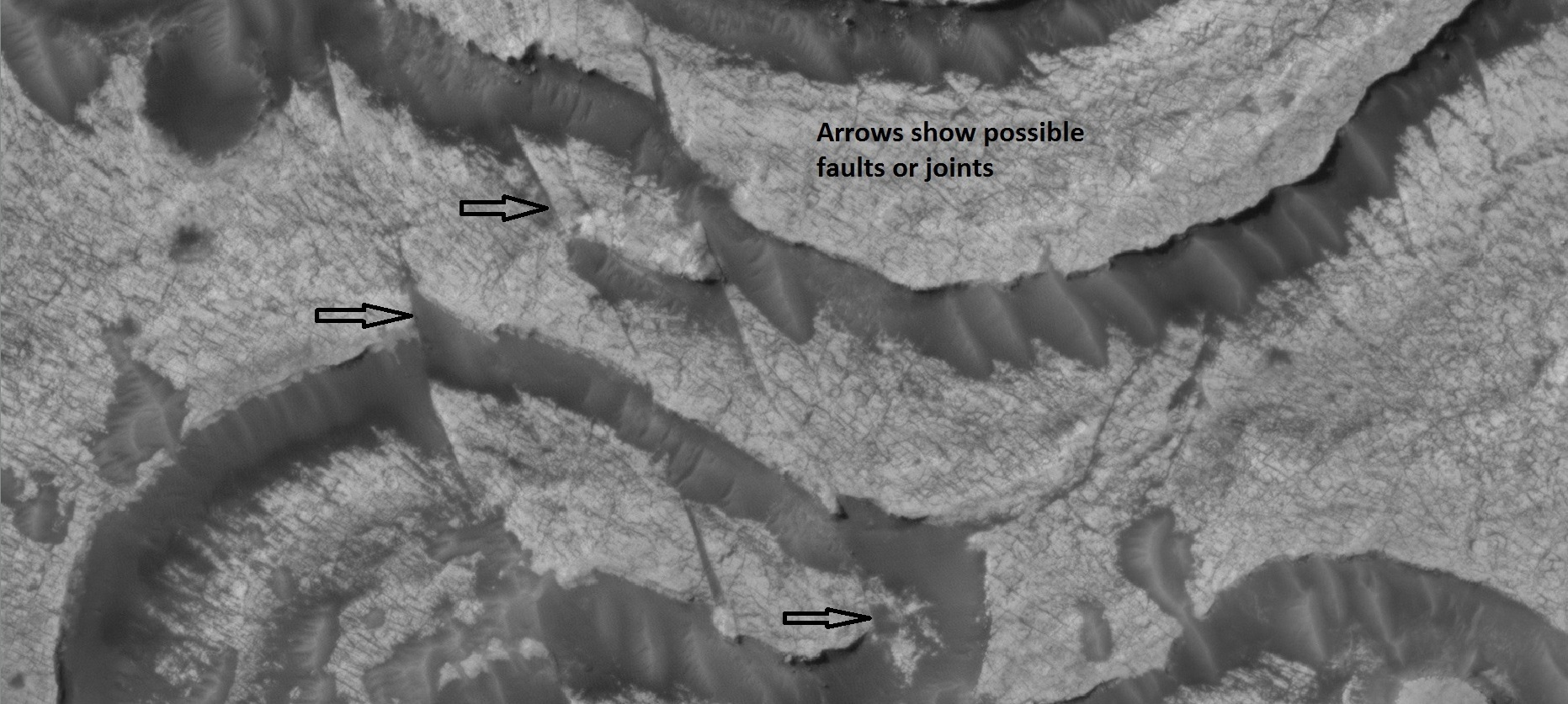
Faults and layers in Firsoff Crater, as seen by HiRISE under HiWish program. Arrows show location of faults.

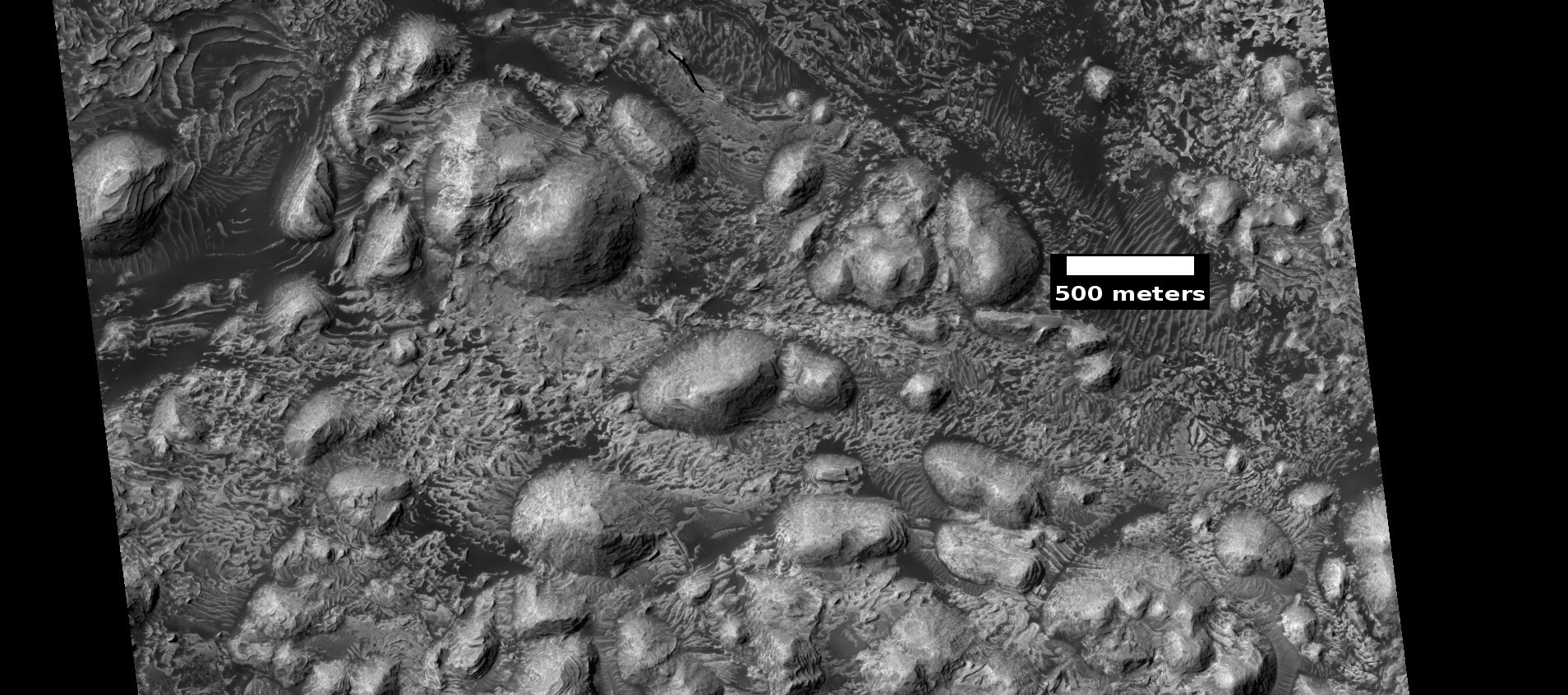
Wide view of layers in Firsoff Crater, as seen by HiRISE under HiWish program.

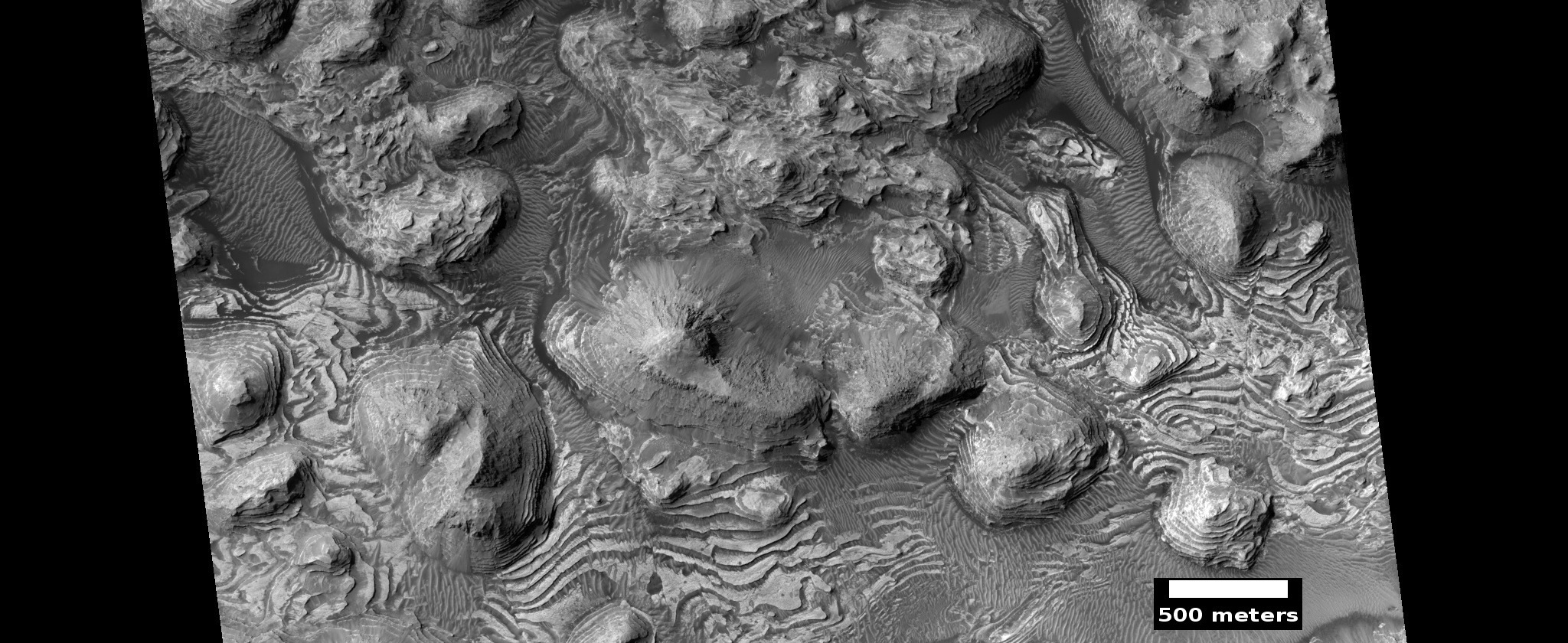
Wide view of layers in Firsoff Crater, as seen by HiRISE under HiWish program.

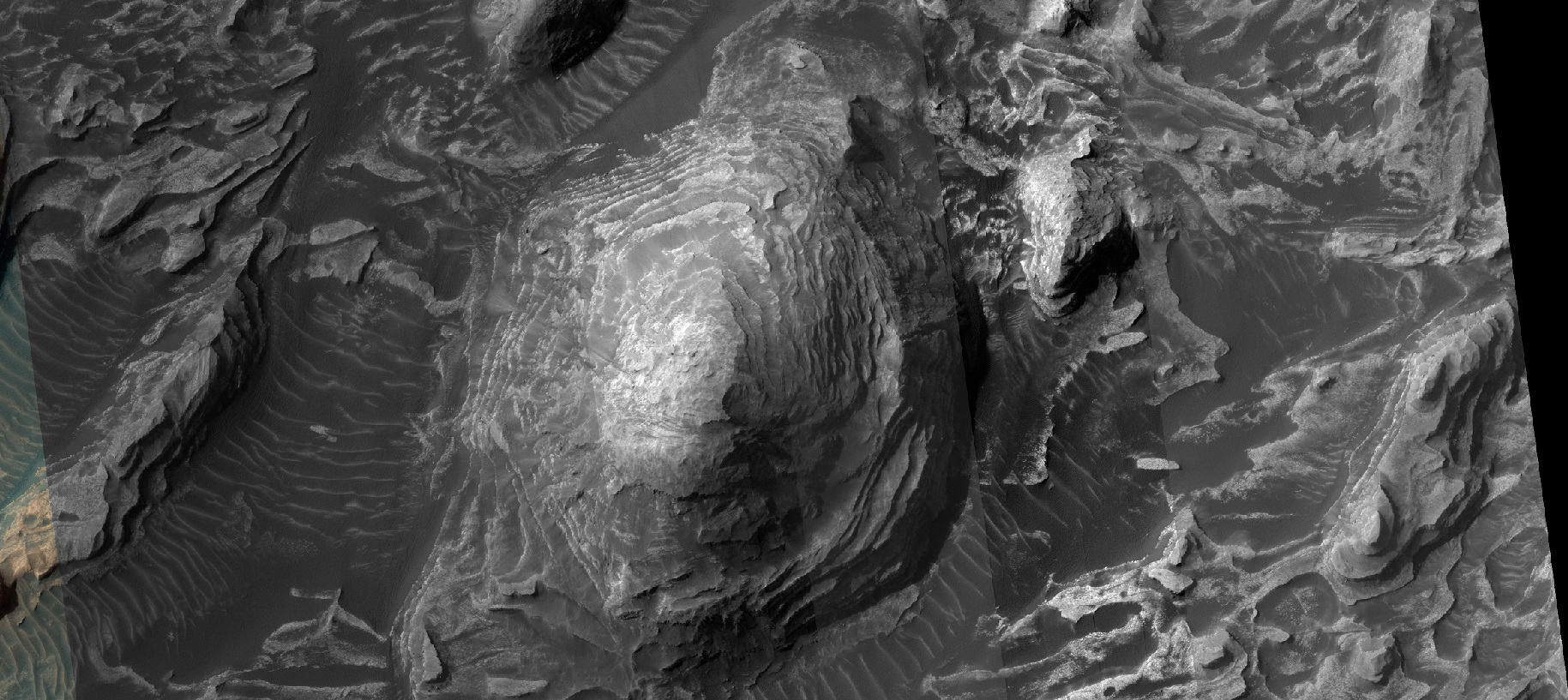
Layered mound in Firsoff Crater from HiRISE image # ESP_79401 1820, under HiWish program

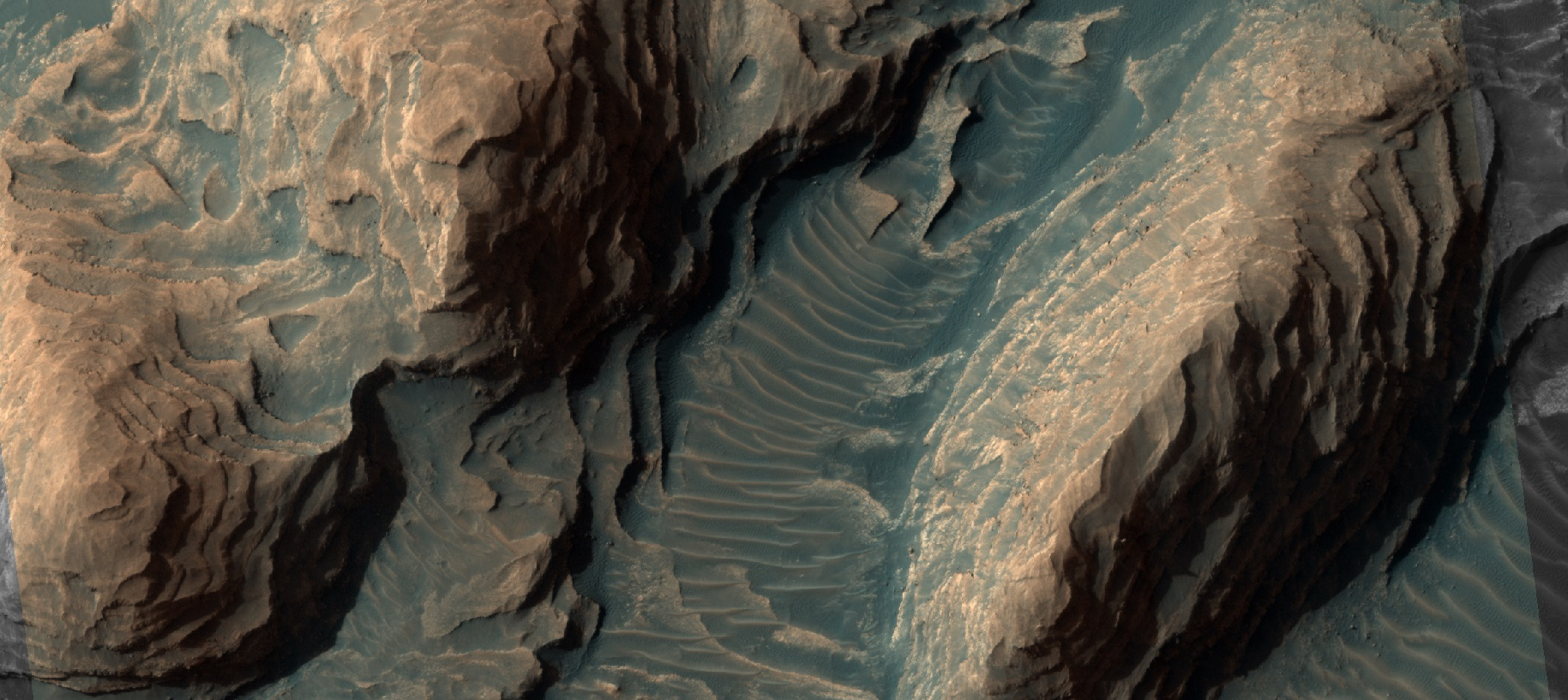
Layered mound, as seen by HiRISE under HiWish program.

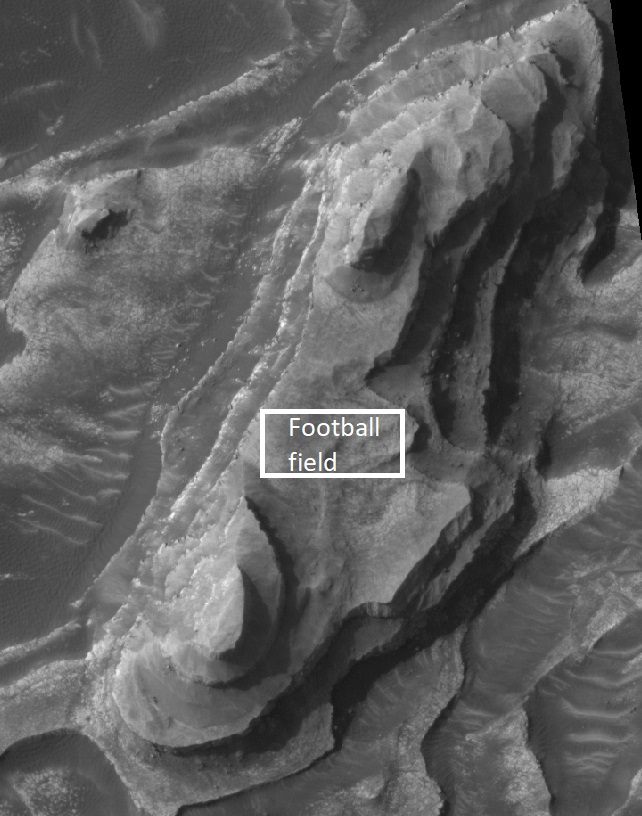
Layered mound, as seen by HiRISE under HiWish program. n The white box represents the size of a football field for scale.

== See also ==
- Climate of Mars
- Geology of Mars
- Groundwater on Mars
- Impact crater
- Impact event
- Life on Mars
- List of craters on Mars
- Ore resources on Mars
- Planetary nomenclature
- Water on Mars
