= Akseli =

Akseli is a Finnish given name. Notable people with the name include:

- Akseli Anttila (1897–1953), Finnish-born Soviet major general of the Red Army
- Akseli Brander (1876–1958), Finnish agronomist, educationist, farmer and politician
- Akseli Gallen-Kallela (1865–1931), Swedish-speaking Finnish painter
- Akseli Hemminki (born 1973), Finnish oncologist and radiotherapist
- Akseli Hirn (1845–1906), Finnish minister
- Akseli Kalermo (born 1997), Finnish footballer
- Akseli Keskinen (born 1999), Finnish sailor
- Akseli Kokkonen (born 1984), Norwegian ski jumper
- Akseli Lankinen (born 1997), Finnish volleyball player
- Akseli Nikula (1884–1956), Finnish psychiatrist and politician
- Akseli Pelvas (born 1989), Finnish footballer
- Akseli Roine (1896–1944), Finnish gymnast
- Akseli Takala (1897–1951), Finnish track and field athlete
- Akseli Toivonen (1887–1954), Finnish architect

== See also ==
- Akseli and Elina (Finnish: Akseli ja Elina), 1970 Finnish drama film
