= Axelle Kabou =

Cameroonian author on development

Axelle Kabou (born 1955) is a Cameroonian journalist, author and development specialist. She studied economy and communication and has been working for development aid. Her 1991 book Et si l'Afrique refusait le developpement (And if Africa Denies Development?) is well-known and discussed. It examined an unwillingness and inability of Africans and African elites to take development of the continent into their own hands without relying on foreign aid.

Nowadays various African intellectuals such as Roger Tagri, George Ayittey, Andrew Mwenda, James Shikwati and Chika Onyeani agree with her analysis, Robert Mugabe being one of the most prominent examples of criticism. The book has been translated into German as well. It enhanced the sharp criticism of Brigitte Erler against classical German foreign aid concepts.

According to Kabou, classical development aid combined naivety and a willingness to support local rulers. The primary actors were foreigners, who assumed the victims were always black. Whitewash, pretext and excuses served to connect foreign aid workers and local corrupt rulers in a useless common ritual.
