= Axel Danielson =

Swedish editor-in-chief

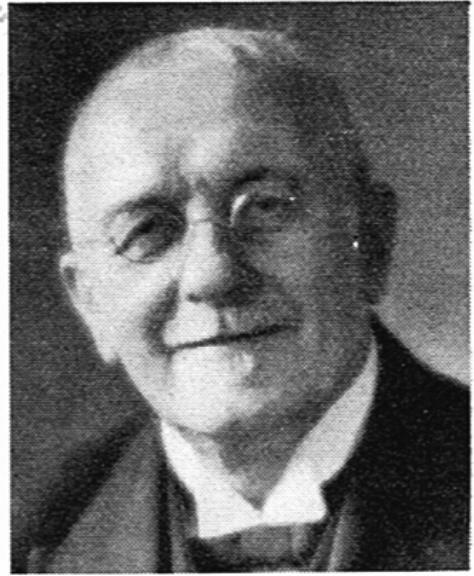
Axel Teodor Danielson

Axel Teodor Danielson (23 March 1867 – 21 June 1949), was a Swedish editor-in-chief.

== Career ==
Danielson was born in Älghult, Kronoberg County to parents Adolf Danielson and Emelie (née Löfgren). He was a typesetter apprentice in Visby 1880–1881 and 1884–1886, as well as in Stockholm 1881–1884. Danielson was typographer and reporter on a Swedish newspaper in United States 1887–1892 and was an office clerk at the office of the Gotlands Allehanda newspaper 1892–1893. Danielson took the maturity exam in 1895 and was a medical student the same year.

He was a student in Uppsala 1896–1898 and the editor and publisher of Veckoblad för populär vetenskap (The Weekly Newspaper for Popular Science) from October 1897 to January 1898. Danielson was a contributor to Stockholms-Tidningen between April 1898 and March 1899 and to Gotlands Allehanda from March 1899. He was the executive director of Gotlands Allehanda Tryckeri AB 1899–1937 and the editor and the legally responsible publisher of the newspaper from 1917 to 1937. Danielson was also the editor and publisher of Tutti Frutti, Småhistorier vid aftonlampan ("Tutti Frutti, Short stories by the evening light") between September 1902 and June 1904. He was a member of the City Council 1905–1935, was the chairman of the board of the Central Library, the lecture association, workers association and the crafts association. Danielson was also the vice chairman of the day care center (Crèche).

== Personal life ==
In 1908 Danielson married Hanna Lovisa Svensson (1883–1970). He was the father of Axel Torbjörn (1908–1944). Danielson died in 1949 and was buried at the Eastern Cemetery in Visby.

== Awards and decorations ==
- Knight of the Order of Vasa
