= Axel Brauns =

German writer and filmmaker

- Born: 2 July 1963 (age 63); Hamburg, West Germany
- Occupations: Writer, filmmaker

Axel Brauns (born 2 July 1963) is a German writer and filmmaker.

== Biography ==
Brauns was born in Hamburg, West Germany, and spent the first two years of his life in the quarter Eimsbüttel. In 1965, his family moved to Hamburg-Groß Flottbek. There Brauns went to a kindergarten, an elementary school and a gymnasium, where he did his Abitur at 19 years of age. He then began studying for a degree in Business Administration and Law at the University of Hamburg, but left it in 1984 to focus on writing.

In 2000, Brauns founded a literary salon, and since 2002, he has been working as a tax advisor.

=== Career as writer and filmmaker ===
Brauns wrote an autobiography called Buntschatten und Fledermäuse – Leben in einer anderen Welt (Coloured Shadows and Bats – Living in Another World), which was published in 2002 and describes his childhood and his experiences growing up with autism. He won the Literaturförderpreis der Stadt Hamburg for an excerpt from it, after which Hoffmann und Campe offered to publish it. Coloured Shadows and Bats came out in 2002, and reached the bestseller list of Der Spiegel in the same year. In 2003, Brauns was nominated for the Deutscher Bücherpreis, in the category "Most successful debut".

In 2004, Brauns produced his first feature film, called Tsunami und Steinhaufen. It premiered in 2008.

In September 2004, Brauns's novel Kraniche und Klopfer came out. It tells the story of a fictional girl named Adina Adelung, who lives in a house with her brother and mother. Her mother constantly brings rubbish (to which she is addicted) into her house. Eventually, Adina finds the path for a new life by meeting a woman called Erla Meier, who takes her to see cranes in a natural reserve.

In 2006, Brauns published the detective novel Tag der Jagd.

== Writings ==
- Buntschatten und Fledermäuse – Leben in einer anderen Welt (Coloured Shadows and Bats – Living in Another World). Hoffmann und Campe, 2002, ISBN 3-455-09353-1.
- Kraniche und Klopfer. Goldmann, 2004, ISBN 3-442-46118-9.
- Tag der Jagd. Hoffmann und Campe, 2006, ISBN 3-455-00586-1.
