= Axel Koenders =

Dutch triathlete

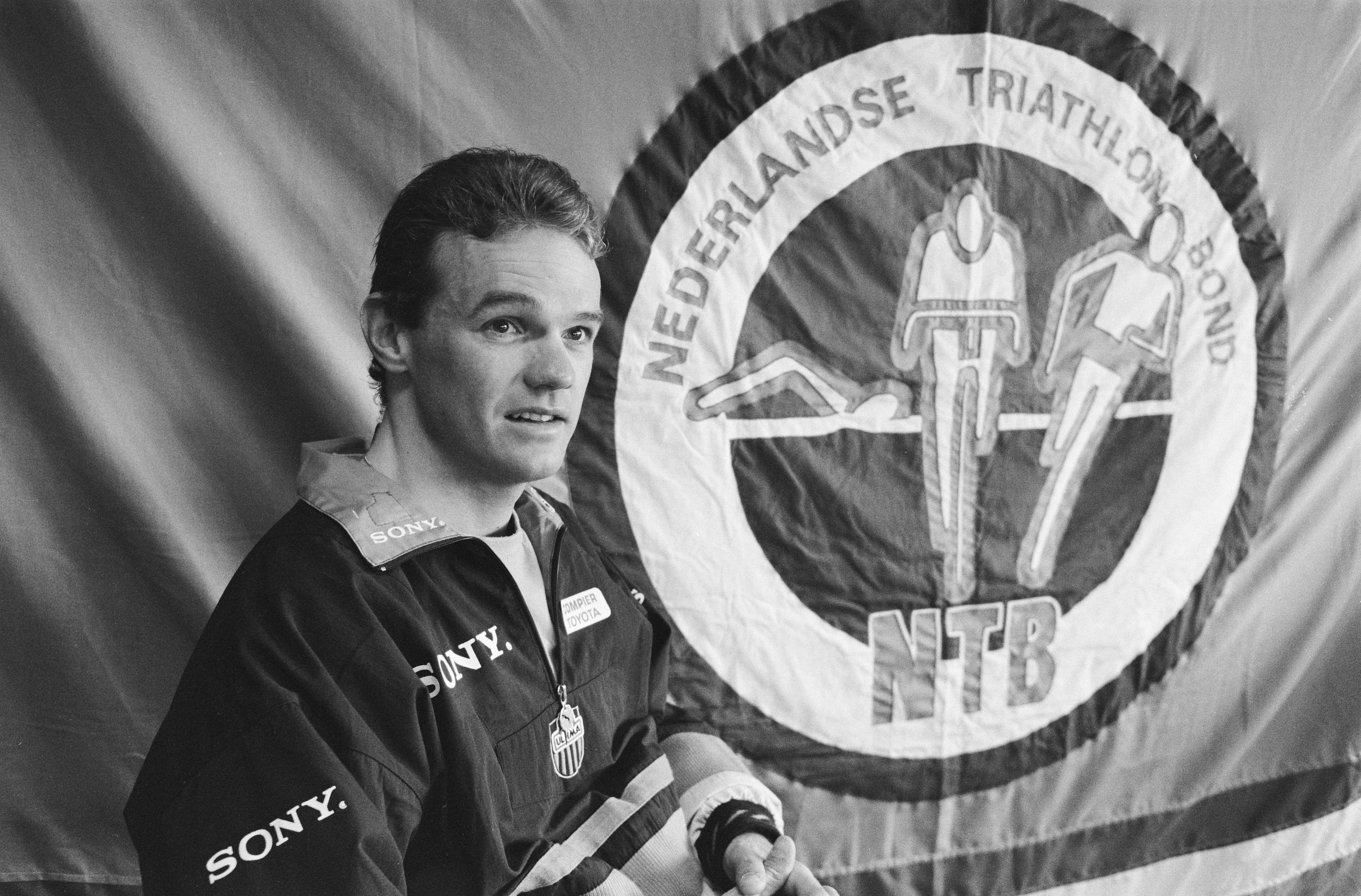
- Axel Koenders in 1989

Personal information
- Born: 28 September 1959 (age 66) Ouderkerk aan de Amstel, the Netherlands

Sport
- Sport: Triathlon

Axel Koenders (born 28 September 1959) was one of the strongest triathlon competitors of the 1980s in the Netherlands. Besides numerous national titles, he won European championships in the long distance in 1987 and 1989. In 1988 he set a world record at 8:13:11 in Roth, Germany. Besides triathlon he also competed in cycling and speedskating at the national level. Since 1994 Koenders runs his fitness center Axel Koenders Fit-Service.

Koenders graduated from the Academy of Physical Education and Sport in Amsterdam, where he specialized in fencing, rowing and speedskating, and then for 10 years worked as a lecturer in physical education. Between 1997 and 2007 he was involved with the Dutch Olympic Committee and served as adviser at the 2000 Summer Olympics and 2002 and 2006 Winter Olympics.
