= Axel Maußen =

German Roman Catholic priest

Axel Maußen, F.S.S.P.
- Born: 1 March 1968 (age 57); Bonn, Germany
- Education: University of Bonn; International Seminary of St. Peter
- Title: District Superior of the German-speaking District of the Priestly Fraternity of St. Peter

Father Axel Maußen, F.S.S.P. (born 1 March 1968) is a German Roman Catholic priest and was the district superior of the German-speaking district of the Priestly Fraternity of St. Peter, which covers the territories of Germany, Austria, Liechtenstein and Switzerland until 2012.

Maußen was born in Bonn, Germany. He studied theology at the University of Bonn and the St. Peter International Seminary in Wigratzbad, Germany. He exerted several pastoral duties in the German-speaking district of the Fraternity, in Vienna in particular. In 2003, Fr. Maußen was named Superior of the district; he currently resides in the new district house located at Wigratzbad, Germany.
