= Axel C. Heitmann =

German businessman (born 1959)

- Born: October 2, 1959 (age 66); Hamburg, Germany
- Occupation: chemical industry executive
- Employer: LANXESS AG

Axel Claus Heitmann (born October 2, 1959) is a German business executive in the chemical industry.

== Life and career ==
Born in Hamburg, Germany, Heitmann studied chemistry as an undergraduate at the University of Hamburg. He went on to earn his doctorate in chemistry from the University of Southampton in England.

After being enrolled in a training program at Bayer AG, he held a series of research and development and management jobs in the company’s rubber manufacturing and cellulose products divisions. In 2002, he rose to the post of head of Bayer’s Rubber Business Group and joined the executive committee of Bayer MaterialScience.

In 2004, when Bayer spun off its rubber and specialty chemicals businesses into a new company, Lanxess AG, Heitmann was named as chairman of the Board of Management.

In 2008, he received a Stevie Award for Best Executive in Europe.

Heitmann is married and has two children.
