= Aksel Frederik Andersen =

Danish mathematician

Aksel Frederik Andersen (10 February 1891 Fodby, Denmark – 1972 Gentofte, Denmark) was a Danish mathematician who worked on infinite series and in particular on Cesàro summation.
