= Axel Lerche =

Danish sports shooter (1903–1949)

Personal information
- Born: 21 November 1903 Kalundborg, Denmark
- Died: 3 October 1949 (aged 45)

Sport
- Sport: Sports shooting

Axel Lerche (21 November 1903 – 3 October 1949) was a Danish sports shooter. He competed at the 1936 Summer Olympics and 1948 Summer Olympics.
