= Axel Firsoff =

British amateur astronomer

- Born: Valdemar Axel Firsoff; 29 January 1910; Bila Tserkva, Ukraine
- Died: 19 November 1981 (aged 71)
- Scientific career
- Fields: astronomy

Valdemar Axel Firsoff FRAS was known principally as an amateur astronomer. He was born on 29 January 1912 in Bila Tserkva, Russian Empire, and died on 19 November 1981. He lived in Lochearnhead, Scotland, before moving to Somerset, England, where he settled in Glastonbury.

== Biography ==
Axel Firsoff held an MA degree in languages and worked as a Swedish translator and in the United Kingdom Patent Office. He was a keen mountaineer and skier, as some of his earlier books reveal, and he was a ski instructor for the British Olympic Ski Team in the 1950s. He developed an interest in science, in particular geology and astronomy and this led him to publish numerous books on the moon and inner planets.

Many of his books also touched on extraterrestrial life and the nature of the mind. In Life, Mind and Galaxies, he speculated that "mind seems to be an entity of the same order as energy and matter", an idea well before its time. Firsoff held unorthodox views, for example he did not believe in the expansion of the universe. In other aspects of his work, such as the nature of the lunar craters, which he considered to be of volcanic rather than cosmological origin, he was later proved to be well wide of the mark.

In his book Strange World of the Moon, Firsoff suggested that there are underground oceans on the moon. Astronomer G. Fielder commented in the New Scientist magazine that most astronomers would not accept this view but as the book contains interesting new ideas it is recommended to all students of the moon.

In a 1977 review for Firsoff's book The Solar Planets in the New Scientist, Ian Ridpath commented that "the author queries the now well-established 234-day rotation period of Venus, introduces the concept of superheated steam in that planet's atmosphere, and proposes seas at the Venusian poles. An inexperienced reader, seeking reliable information on our modern knowledge of the Solar System that the book promises, will not know that these views are unorthodox."

== Honors ==
Firsoff crater, located in Meridiani Planum on the planet Mars, is named in Firsoff's honor. Firsoff Crater is located at 2.63° North, 350.58° East.

== Selected publications ==
- Ski Track on the Battlefield - 1942
- The Tatra Mountains - 1942
- The Unity of Europe - 1947
- The Cairngorms on Foot and Ski - 1949
- Arran With Camera and Sketchbook - 1951
- Our Neighbor Worlds - 1953
- In the Hills of Breadalbane: Illustrated from the author's photos and drawings - 1954
- Moon Atlas - 1961
- The Surface of the Moon - 1961
- Strange World of the Moon - 1962
- The Crust Of The Earth - 1962
- Life Beyond the Earth: A Study in Exobiology - 1963
- Facing the Universe - 1966
- Life, Mind and Galaxies - 1967
- The Interior Planets - 1968
- The Old Moon and the New - 1969
- The World of Mars - 1969
- Gemstones of the British Isles - 1971
- Life among the Stars - 1974
- Working with Gemstones - 1974
- The Rockhound's Handbook - 1975
- The Solar Planets - 1977
- At the Crossroads of Knowledge - 1977
- The New Face of Mars - 1982
