= Axel Perneczky =

Hungarian neurosurgeon

Axel Perneczky (1 November 1945 – 24 January 2009) was a renowned Hungarian neurosurgeon, who for the majority of his career, practised neurosurgery in Mainz in Germany. He was a major contributor to the development of endoscopic and minimally invasive neurosurgical procedures, particularly in the field of cerebrovascular neurosurgery.

Dr. Perneckzky was the editor of the journal Minimally Invasive Neurosurgery, published by Thieme.

== Works ==
- Axel, Perneczky; Reisch, Robert; Kindel, Stefan; Tschabitscher, Manfred (2008). Keyhole approaches in neurosurgery. Austria: Springer-Verlag Wien. ISBN 9783211695012.
