= Eskil (disambiguation) =

Eskil is a masculine given name mainly in use in Scandinavia. In Danish and Norwegian it may be spelled Eskild. The name may refer to:

- Saint Eskil, 11th century Anglo-Saxon monk and missionary
- Eskild Andersen Kongsbakke, c. 1620 – 1674 Danish commander and Governor of Danish India
- Eskild Bakke Olsen
- Eskil Brodd (1885–1969), Swedish diver
- Eskil Brøndbo (born 1970), Norwegian drummer
- Eskild Bruun, Norwegian jurist
- Eskild Dall (born 2003), Danish footballer
- Eskild Ebbesen (born 1972), Danish rower
- Eskil Erlandsson (born 1957), Swedish politician
- Eskil Ervik (born 1975), Norwegian speedskater
- Eskil Falk (1889–1963), Swedish track and field athlete
- Eskil Gøye
- Eskil Hagen (born 1970), Norwegian paralympian
- Eskil Hemberg (1938–2004), Swedish composer and conductor
- Eskild Jensen (1925–2013), Norwegian civil servant and politician
- Eskild Jensen Sr., Norwegian businessperson
- Eskil Kinneberg (born 1992), Norwegian orienteer
- Eskil of Lund, Danish 12th century archbishop
- Eskil Lundahl (1905–1992), Swedish swimmer
- Eskil Magnusson (1175–1227), Swedish politician and lawmaker
- Eskil Pedersen (born 1984), Norwegian politician
- Eskil Rønningsbakken (born 1979), Norwegian balance artist
- Eskil Suter (born 1967), Swiss motorcycle racer and constructor
- Eskil Vogt (born 1974), Norwegian film director and screenwriter
- Ole Eskild Dahlstrøm, Norwegian ice hockey player

== Other uses ==
- Eskil, the main character of the novel Vale of the Vole by Piers Anthony
- Eskil, Aksaray Province, a town in Turkey
- Eskilstuna, a city in Sweden
