= Axel Müller =

Axel Müller may refer to:

- Axel Müller (archer) (born 1992), Swiss archer
- Axel Müller (rugby union) (born 1993), Argentine rugby union player
- Axel Müller (footballer) (born 1996), Uruguayan association footballer
- Axel Müller (politician) (born 1963), German politician
