= Axel Elmlund =

Swedish actor (1838–1901)

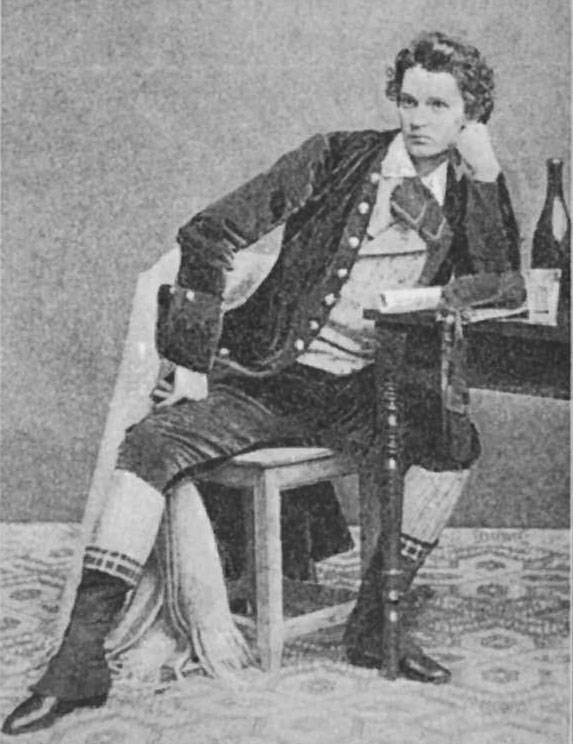
- Axel Elmlund (1838-1894) as Richard Brinsley Sheridan in his 20s
- Born: 12 April 1838; Stockholm, Sweden
- Died: 23 November 1901; Stockholm, Sweden
- Occupation(s): Ballet Dancer; Stage Actor

Axel Elmlund (1838-1901), was a Swedish ballet dancer and stage actor.

He was the son of the shoemaker Sven Axel Elmlund and Christina Dorothea Wilhelmina Björkman. He never married.

He was a student of the Royal Swedish Ballet at the Royal Swedish Opera in 1850-55, a figurant dancer in 1855-58, and a pantomime dancer in 1858-61. He was a recognized for his ability as a dancer by August Bournonville, who reportedly lamented Elmlund's choice to interrupt a promising career as a dancer to retrain as an actor instead.

In 1856, he became a student actor at the Royal Dramatic Theatre, where he was engaged in 1858-1891 - from 1864 as a premier actor. He was also active as a stage director.

Axel Elmlund attracted attention for his handsome appearance and his physical control and body language onstage, an advantage from his ballet training. Within just a couple of years after his debut he became a member of the theatre's elite actors and was particularly appreciated for his roles as a hero in romantic tragedies. The nature of such roles did however result in a decline of his career during his later years onstage. He retired in 1891 and was able to live comfortably on his income.
