= Capitalist Nigger =

Book by Chika Onyeani

Capitalist Nigger: The Road to Success: A Spider Web Doctrine
- Author: Chika Onyeani
- Language: English
- Subject: Economics
- Genre: Status of Africans
- Publisher: Timbuktu Publishers
- Publication date: 2000
- Publication place: United States
- Media type: Print (hardback & paperback), audiobook
- ISBN: 1-86842-270-4
- OCLC: 122934141

Capitalist Nigger: The Road to Success, a Spider-Web Doctrine is the title of a controversial book by African Sun Times publisher/editor-in-chief, Dr. Chika Onyeani.

== Overview ==
=== Synopsis ===
Capitalist Nigger asserts that the Black race is a consumer race and not a productive one. Says the author, Chika Onyeani, "We are a conquered race and it is utterly foolish for us to believe that we are independent. The Black Race depends on other communities for its culture, its language, its feeding, and its clothing." "Despite enormous natural resources," according to author, "Blacks are economic slaves because they lack the 'killer-instinct' and 'devil-may-care' attitude of the Caucasian, as well as the 'spider web economic mentality' of the Asian." The author is not afraid to use the word 'nigger' in both pejorative or stereotypic senses. He says, "It is not what you call me, but what I answer to, that matters most."

=== Status of Blacks ===
The book asserts that "Blacks are economic slaves. We are owned lock stock and barrel by people of European-origin ... I am tired of hearing Blacks always blaming others for their lack of progress in this world; I am tired of the whining and victim-mentality. I am tired of listening to the same complaint, day in day out - racism this, racism that. It's getting us nowhere." "Africans have a stance, 'live for today, let tomorrow take care of itself and be damned' attitude," the author says. "We've become a sheep-like consumer race that depends on other communities for our culture, language, feeding, and clothing. We've become economic slaves in Western society." The argument that Blacks must become economically self-reliant and foster collective partnering relationships is not new. It has been voiced by such notable figures as Booker T. Washington, W. E. B. Du Bois, Frantz Fanon, Marcus Garvey, Steve Biko, Ezekiel Mphahlele, Thabo Mbeki, and Malcolm X.

=== "Spider web doctrine" ===
The basis of Onyeani's argument is that Blacks must mimic Asian people and adopt what he calls a "spider-web doctrine". According to Onyeani, by adopting this economic concept Blacks will be able to attract wealth to their communities, and trap it there as a spider traps flies. This is the basis for the book's assertions; that Blacks must only purchase Black-manufactured goods, patronize Black stores, or eat in Black establishments, etc.

Though it resulted in millions of my people being taken as slaves to the New World, America, I can still duff my hat to a small group of individuals who had the tenacity to cross the Atlantic Ocean to open America to the world. You have to admire the courage of the small group of diabolical individuals who set out to invade Africa and take our people as slaves. (Capitalist Nigger, page 21)

== Response ==
=== Criticism ===
The book has received a large amount of criticism in a number of areas. It relies heavily on out-of-date racial stereotypes of Black, Caucasian, Jewish, Chinese, Japanese and Indian peoples. Specifically, author Onyeani's argument relies on dubious stereotypes, that blacks are "lazy" and that Indians are successful and entrepreneurial. Onyeani ignores the wealth divide in China and India, nations he deems successful because of their accomplishments in the manufacture of goods. In an article in the South African weekly Mail & Guardian, he commented that the success of Indian society can be shown because "In India, the larger part of the population is still poor. So what? India is leading in a lot of ways. If you make a call to [a] credit card company, chances are it would be answered in India. Just because of the way they have been able to do the (sic) things."

=== Accusations of inaccuracies and hypocrisy ===
A few of his most inaccurate comments and racial stereotypes include: "In Africa there are more Mercedes Benz, BMW (sic) and Jaguars than there are people." "There is nothing in Africa that is owned by the people."

One notable contradiction is when he calls for adoption of the spider web doctrine, but then cautions successful 'capitalist niggers' (like himself) to keep other Blacks at arm's length.

=== Stereotypes and racism ===
Stereotypes include the exceptional intelligence and capability of the Jews, the industrious nature of Asians, and the "killer instinct" and "devil-may-care" tenacity of Caucasians. Blacks are described as whiners, passive, economically illiterate, intellectually bankrupt and materialistic.

On the final page of the book, Onyeani gives his reason for writing the book (which he claims changed his life); that it would be a success and he would "make a lot of money."

=== Reviews ===
Pan-Africanist director Owen 'Alik Shahadah praises the core thesis of the book by stating in his article on African agency that the inferiority complex is an overlooked phenomenon which washes all aspects of African life. He continues by saying that Capitalist Nigger is a daring exposé of a deep problem of "Africans being products, not producers". Shahadah goes on to explain that, "naturally, these kinds of agendas which destroy White economic privilege in Africa will not be welcomed by all those that continue to profit from an economically weak African nation."

A review article in the Financial Mail by Dr Stella M Nkomo (Professor of Management at the University of South Africa's Graduate School of Business Leadership) levied heavy criticism at Onyeani. The article noted that "Onyeani has no qualms about degrading not just an entire group of people but himself as well." She further commented, "The notion that Black people should aspire to be 'White' is both insulting and degrading." commented that "Onyeani is entitled to his opinions about black people. He is, however, not entitled to his gratuitous insults."

Onyeani was asked in an interview the question, "What is stopping blacks from doing what they need to do?" He replied simply "inferiority complex".

Continental Africans think the world owes them something. We whine and whine about how the Europeans looted our natural resources. Yes, they did, so what? We allowed them to do it, and we are still allowing them to do it even today. There is too much whining among Africans, Blacks, continental Africans and Africans in the Diaspora - whine, whine, whine ad nauseam. We are beggars. We beg for everything. If you need something, be a man. Go and get it! Don't start whining for somebody to do it or get it for you. (Capitalist Nigger, page 35).

== Further writing ==
The Broederbond Conspiracy is a fiction book also written by Dr. Onyeani. The book is about a fictional Nigerian Secret Service agent named Chima Amadi. In the book, he fights against a conspiracy organized by the Apartheid-era white supremacist organization the Broederbond. The author is sad that Black actors continue to clamor to play the role of James Bond without success, hence he decided to write "The Broederbond Conspiracy" to fulfill the aspirations of Blacks to play the James Bond role.
