= Axel Murswieck =

German political scientist and commentator

Axel Murswieck is a German political scientist, commentator, and associate professor of political science at the Faculty of Economic and Social Sciences at Heidelberg University.

== Education ==
Murswieck studied political science, history and English studies at the Free University of Berlin. Diploma in political science in 1969. In 1973, he obtained a Ph.D. in social science from Bielefeld University.

== Career ==
From 1969 to 1973, Murswieck worked as a research associate and lecturer at LMU Munich, before joining Heidelberg University as assistant professor of political science in 1973. Research fellowships included those at Cornell University in Ithaca (US), Washington, D.C., and at the Institut d'Études Politiques in Grenoble (France). Axel Murswieck taught at the Institut d'Études Politiques in Paris, at the Universidad Autónoma in Barcelona and at the Institute of Administrative Sciences (Deutsche Hochschule für Verwaltungswissenschaften) in Speyer, Germany. Since 1989, he has been associate professor of political science at Heidelberg University. Between 1991 and 2000, he headed the Research Committee "Political system and governance of the Federal Republic of Germany" of the German Political Science Association (DVPW).

== Books/edited volumes (selection) ==
- Regierungsform durch Planungsorganisation: Eine empirische Untersuchung im Bereich der Bundesregierung, Opladen 1975
- Die staatliche Kontrolle der Arzneimittelsicherheit in der Bundesrepublik und den USA, Opladen 1983
- Sozialpolitik in den USA. Eine Einführung Opladen: Westdeutscher Verlag, 1988
- (ed.) Regieren und Politikberatung, Opladen 1994
- editor with Hans-Ulrich Derlien. Der Politikzyklus zwischen Bonn und Brüssel, Opladen 1999
- editor with Hans-Ulrich Derlien. Regieren nach Wahlen, Opladen 2001

== Articles ==
- Public Policies in Disarray: Political Restraints in Policy-Making, in: International Social Science Journal, Vol. 108 (1986).
- Advising the Government – A Comparative View on France and West Germany, in: International Social Science Journal, 1989.
- Policy Advice and Decisionmaking in the German Federal Bureaucracy, in: Guy Peters/ Anthony Barker (eds.): Advising West German Governments: Inquiries, Expertise and Public Policy. Edinburgh, 1993.
- A New World of Welfare? Amerika nach der Sozialhilfereform, in: Soziale Sicherheit 5/2002.
