= Axel von Harnack =

German library scientist and historian (1895–1974)

Friedrich Hermann Julius Axel von Harnack (September 12, 1895 in Wilmersdorf – June 17, 1974 in Tübingen) was a German librarian, historian and philologist. He was the cousin of Arvid and Falk Harnack and worked to get Arvid and his wife, Mildred Harnack released from Nazi detention after they were arrested in connection with the Red Orchestra. He was the first in the family to be told of Arvid and Mildred's arrest, which had been kept secret by the Nazis. In 1947, he published a memoir of the trial that convicted Arvid and Mildred Harnack of high treason and sentenced them to death.

== Sources ==
- Genealogisches Handbuch des Adels. Adelige Häuser B. Band XV, C. A. Starke Verlag, Limburg (Lahn) 1984, p. 213 (Band 83 der Gesamtreihe, ISSN 0435-2408). (in German)
- Alexandra Habermann, Rainer Klemmt, Frauke Siefkes: Lexikon deutscher wissenschaftlicher Bibliothekare 1925–1980. Klostermann, Frankfurt 1985, ISBN 3-465-01664-5, pp. 111–112. (in German)
