= Axel Brusewitz =

Swedish political scientist

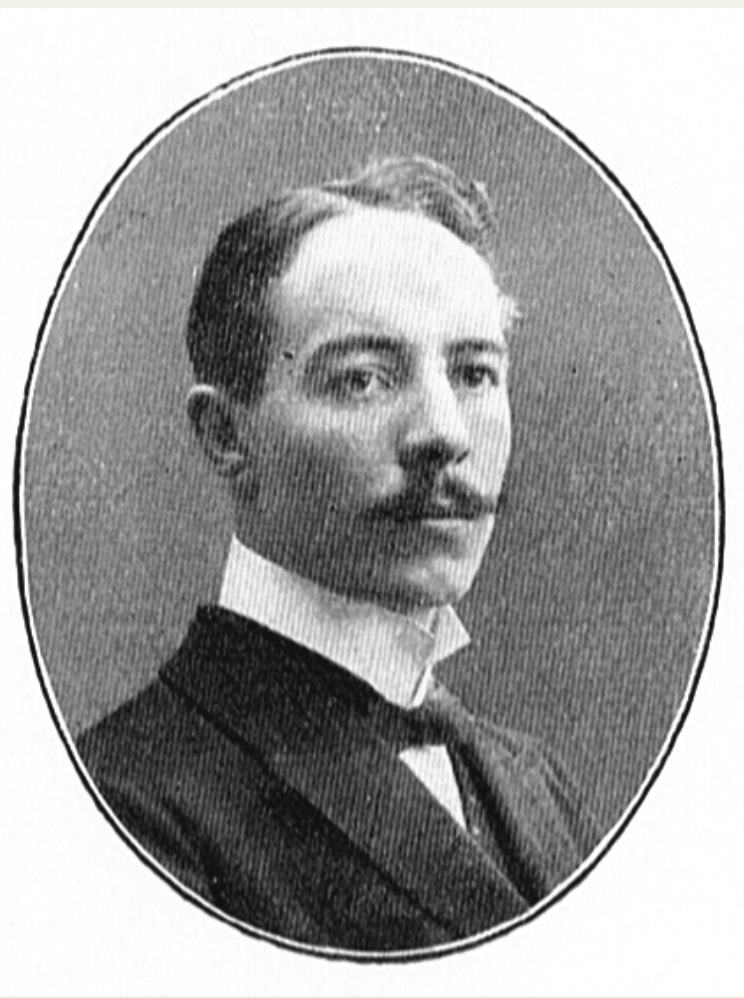

Axel Brusewitz (9 June 1881 – 27 September 1950) was a Swedish professor in political science, well known for his belief in democracy and his opposition towards the traditional anti-democratic conservatism of Swedish royal court and bureaucracy. He was a specialist in constitutional history. He wrote influential works about, among other things, the Swedish constitution of 1809.

Brusewitz was on the side of liberal premier Karl Staaff in the political fight about parliamentarism 1914.

As professor in Uppsala, he was a mentor of other political scientists that had important roles in Swedish public life, among them the socialist, later liberal, professor and newspaper editor Herbert Tingsten and the professor and later conservative party leader Gunnar Heckscher.

From 1943 to 1947, Brusewitz was a member of the committee that wrote the proposal of a revised constitutional law for the Freedom of the Press.
