= Axel Malmgren =

Swedish artist

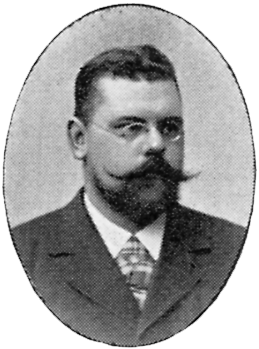
Axel Petter Malmgren - from Svenskt Porträttgalleri XX

Axel Petter Malmgren (August 28, 1857 in Lund - January 21, 1901 in Anyang), was a Swedish artist. He painted genre motifs and interiors as well as landscapes. He worked for several years from 1889 as restorer at the Nationalmuseum in Stockholm.

Malmgren was a student at the Royal Institute of Art in Stockholm 1879-83. He studied the picture restoration under A. Hauser in Munich 1887-89. He was a drawing teacher at Katarina elementary school in Stockholm, 1883–87, and 1889.
