= Axel Wibrån =

Swedish footballer (born 1985)

Personal information
- Date of birth: 9 September 1985 (age 41)
- Place of birth: Sweden
- Position: Goalkeeper

Team information
- Current team: GAIS

Senior career*
Years	Team	Apps	(Gls)
- Lindome GIF
- Utsiktens BK
?-2007	Örgryte IS		
- * Club domestic league appearances and goals

Axel Wibrån (born 9 September 1985) is a Swedish football goalkeeper. His first senior match was in October 2005. He came to GAIS in 2007 from Örgryte IS.
