= Akseli Hemminki =

Akseli Hemminki July 27, 1973 (age 53) (Helsinki) is a Finnish specialist in Oncology and Radiotherapy, Professor of Oncology and founder of two biotechnology companies.

== Career ==
Akseli Hemminki worked in University of Alabama at Birmingham in 2000–2002, first as a post doctoral researcher and later as a Research Assistant Professor. Soon after his return to Finland in 2002 he founded his own research group in University of Helsinki, Cancer Gene Therapy Group which he is still leading. In 2007-2013 Hemminki worked as a K. Albin Johansson Research Professor. In 2015 he was appointed as a Jane and Aatos Erkko Professor of Oncology for five years period. Akseli Hemminki has been selected as an "Outstanding Young Person of the World" by Junior Chamber International in 2006.

Besides his scientific career Hemminki has worked as a physician in 1998–1999, as a resident in 2003-2007 and as a specialist in oncology since 2007 in HUS (Hospital district of Helsinki and Uusimaa) and Docrates Cancer Center.

== Research ==
Akseli Hemminki's research focuses on cancer immunotherapy and especially on oncolytic adenoviruses. The goal of his research group is to create a new oncolytic adenovirus based treatment for cancers with no available curative treatment at the moment. The key finding of the group is that oncolytic viruses – besides lyse tumor cells by oncolysis – trigger immune response towards the tumor. Recently, Hemminki's group has focused on attempting to enable T-cell therapy of solid tumors with oncolytic adenoviruses. To facilitate setting up clinical trials Akseli Hemminki has founded two biotechnology companies: 2008 Oncos Therapeutics (merged with Targovax ASA in 2015) and 2013 TILT Biotherapeutics. Oncos completed the first oncolytic virus trial ever performed in Northern Europe in fall 2013. Over 300 patients have been treated with cancer drugs developed by Hemminki.
