= Axel Hultgren =

Swedish metallurgist (1886–1974)

Axel Gustaf Emanuel Hultgren (November 16, 1886 – May 15, 1974) was a Swedish metallurgist.

Hultgren was born near Kalmar, Sweden and studied metallurgy at the Royal Institute of Technology in Stockholm, Sweden. Following his MSc and some temporary positions in teaching, industry and a research visit in Berlin under Prof. H. Hanemann, Hultgren joined SKF bearing company in Gothenburg as a manager for the heat treatment and later as a metallurgist. In 1920 he published his monograph on tungsten steels. Later, in 1937 he became the first Metallography Professor at the Institute.

His focus was to combine experimental methods and metallographic observation with theoretical reasoning, in a deductive way.

Hultgren was elected a member of the Royal Swedish Academy of Engineering Sciences in 1930 and of the Royal Swedish Academy of Sciences in 1945.

== Selected works ==
- Hultgren, A., 1920, A metallographic study of tungsten steels, John Wiley & Sons.
- Hultgren, A., 1947, Isothermal transformation of Austenite. Transactions of the ASM, 39, 915-989
