= Axel Axelsson (handballer) =

Icelandic handball player (born 1951)

Personal information
- Full name: Axel Sölvi Axelsson
- Nationality: Icelandic
- Born: 25 July 1951 (age 75)

Sport
- Sport: Handball
- Current club: Retired
National team
Years	Team	Apps	(Gls)
–	Iceland	84	(328)

Axel Axelsson (born 25 July 1951) is an Icelandic former handball player who competed in the 1972 Summer Olympics.
