= Mirabaud Group =

Swiss private bank

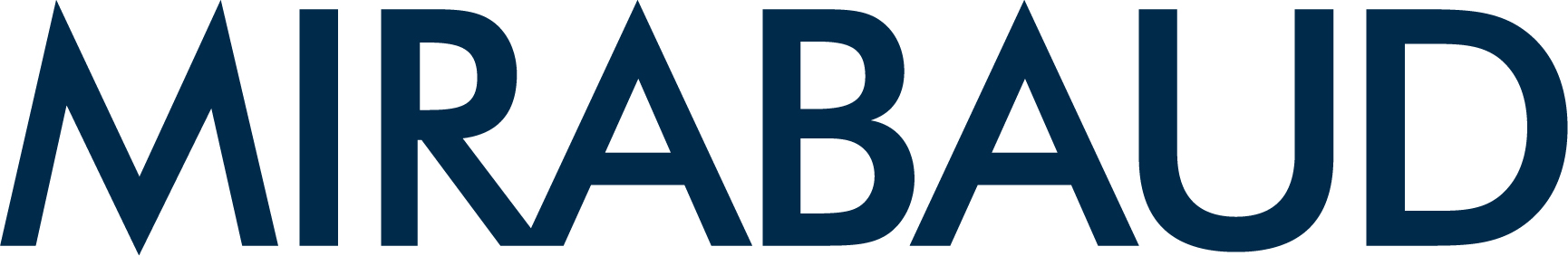
- Type: Société en commandite par actions
- Industry: Financial services
- Founded: 1819; 207 years ago
- Headquarters: Geneva, Switzerland
- Area served: worldwide
- Services: Private banking, asset management, wealth management, investments, securities
- AUM: CHF 32.3 billion (2024)
- Total assets: CHF 1.9 billion (2024)
- Number of employees: 696 (2024)
- Website: https://www.mirabaud.com/

Mirabaud is a Swiss private bank based in Geneva, Switzerland. Mirabaud provides services in wealth management, asset management and brokerage to private clients and institutions around the world.

Founded in 1819, it gradually developed into the third largest private bank in Geneva. Six partners are involved in the group's day-to-day management.

== History ==
Mirabaud et Cie was founded in 1819 and is one of the oldest banks in Switzerland. Family-owned and operated, the bank has played a key part in the construction and development of the Swiss financial system, helping co-found the Geneva Stock Exchange in 1857.

In 1973, it pioneered the development of Swiss hedge funds. In 1985, Mirabaud opened its first foreign bureau in Montréal, followed in 1990 by the reinforcement of its historical presence in London

The first Asian office was opened in Hong Kong in 1997 and one year later, the bank reinforced its presence in Switzerland by opening its first subsidiary in Zurich.

In 2001, Mirabaud significantly grew its asset management teams in Geneva and London. The same year, the Group created LPP Gestion SA to operate in the field of liability management services for pension funds.

From 2003 onwards the Group continued to solidify its presence in the EU, Switzerland, and the Middle East: a new subsidiary opened in Paris, a majority stake in Jenni & Cie (Basel) was purchased in 2004, and another banking office opened in Dubai in 2007.

In 2010, the Group acquired Venture Finanzas in Spain and pursued its strategic implantation by opening offices in Madrid, Barcelona, Valencia and Seville.

In 2011, Mirabaud consolidated its asset management activities in Luxembourg by creating Mirabaud Asset Management (Europe) SA. A bank (Mirabaud & Cie (Europe) SA) followed in 2014. In 2015, the Group announced the acquisition of two further banking licenses in Spain and France.

The group underwent a major structural change in 2014: Mirabaud's activities became integrated into Mirabaud SCA, a Swiss corporate partnership. For the first time, the Group also publishes its annual results.

== Activities ==
Mirabaud's headquarters are located in Geneva, Switzerland, but the Group has offices around the world. These include subsidiaries in Switzerland (Geneva, Basel, Zurich), Europe (London, Luxembourg, Paris, Madrid, Barcelona, Valencia, Seville and Milan), and elsewhere around the globe (Montreal, Hong Kong, and Dubai amongst others. The Group concentrates on three main divisions: wealth management, asset management, and brokerage.

== Controversy ==
In September 2024, Swiss financial market regulator FINMA announced that it had confiscated CHF 12.7 million from Mirabaud for breaches of financial market law and money-laundering obligations.

FINMA said that its investigations "revealed that the Mirabaud inadequately reviewed and documented the beneficial ownership and economic background of numerous transactions despite indications of increased money-laundering risks in particular in connection with qualified tax avoidance and concrete warnings since 2018 concerning the relevant client relationships".

== Sponsorship ==
Since 2005 Mirabaud is the main sponsor of the Bol d’Or Mirabaud – the longest fresh water sailboat regatta in Europe that is held annually on Lake Geneva. In 2019, to celebrate its 200th anniversary the bank made the Geneva Museum of Modern Arts free to all visitors.
