= Axel Axelsson (footballer) =

Icelandic former footballer

Personal information
- Full name: Axel Axelsson
- Date of birth: 1942 (age 83–84)
- Place of birth: Iceland
- Position: Forward

Senior career*
Years	Team	Apps	(Gls)
- Þróttur Reykjavík

International career
1963–1964	Iceland	3	(0)
- * Club domestic league appearances and goals

Axel Axelsson (born 1942) is an Icelandic former footballer who played as a forward. He won three caps for the Iceland national football team between 1963 and 1964.
