= Axel de Reuterskiöld =

Swedish philatelist

Baron Axel de Reuterskiöld (Stockholm, 1860 – 7 March 1937, Lausanne), known as de Reuter to his friends, was a Swedish philatelist who signed the Roll of Distinguished Philatelists in 1921. He was an expert in the stamps of Switzerland. Together with the French banker and philatelist Paul Mirabaud he wrote the standard reference work: "Les Timbres Postes de la Suisse 1843-1860" which was published in 1899. The book is considered very well researched and the first published deep study of Swiss philately. In some fields the book is still considered a standard reference and has been the basis for many more modern or more particular enquiries into the field of the Swiss classical issues.
