= List of 1912 Summer Olympics medal winners =

The 1912 Summer Olympics (Swedish: Olympiska sommarspelen 1912), officially known as the Games of the V Olympiad, were an international multi-sport event held in Stockholm, Sweden, between 5 May and 22 July 1912. Twenty-eight nations and 2,408 competitors, including 48 women, competed in 102 events in 16 sports.

== Athletics ==
Event	Gold	Silver	Bronze
100 metres	Ralph Craig; United States	Alvah Meyer; United States	Donald Lippincott; United States
200 metres	Ralph Craig; United States	Donald Lippincott; United States	Willie Applegarth; Great Britain
400 metres	Charles Reidpath; United States	Hanns Braun; Germany	Edward Lindberg; United States
800 metres	Ted Meredith; United States	Mel Sheppard; United States	Ira Davenport; United States
1500 metres	Arnold Jackson; Great Britain	Abel Kiviat; United States	Norman Taber; United States
5000 metres	Hannes Kolehmainen; Finland	Jean Bouin; France	George Hutson; Great Britain
10,000 metres	Hannes Kolehmainen; Finland	Lewis Tewanima; United States	Albin Stenroos; Finland
110 metres hurdles	Fred Kelly; United States	James Wendell; United States	Martin Hawkins; United States
4 x 100 metres relay	Great Britain; Willie Applegarth; Victor d'Arcy; David Jacobs; Henry Macintosh	Sweden; Knut Lindberg; Charles Luther; Ivan Möller; Ture Person	none awarded
4 x 400 metres relay	United States; Edward Lindberg; Ted Meredith; Charles Reidpath; Mel Sheppard	France; Pierre Failliot; Charles Lelong; Charles Poulenard; Robert Schurrer	Great Britain; Ernest Henley; George Nicol; Cyril Seedhouse; James Soutter
3000 metres team race	United States; Tell Berna; George Bonhag; Abel Kiviat; Louis Scott; Norman Taber	Sweden; Bror Fock; Nils Frykberg; Thorild Olsson; Ernst Wide; John Zander	Great Britain; Joe Cottrill; George Hutson; William Moore; Edward Owen; Cyril Porter
Marathon	Ken McArthur; South Africa	Christian Gitsham; South Africa	Gaston Strobino; United States
10 kilometres walk	George Goulding; Canada	Ernest Webb; Great Britain	Fernando Altimani; Italy
Individual cross country	Hannes Kolehmainen; Finland	Hjalmar Andersson; Sweden	John Eke; Sweden
Team cross country	Sweden; Hjalmar Andersson; John Eke; Josef Ternström	Finland; Jalmari Eskola; Hannes Kolehmainen; Albin Stenroos	Great Britain; Ernest Glover; Frederick Hibbins; Thomas Humphreys
Long jump	Albert Gutterson; United States	Calvin Bricker; Canada	Georg Åberg; Sweden
Triple jump	Gustaf Lindblom; Sweden	Georg Åberg; Sweden	Erik Almlöf; Sweden
High jump	Alma Richards; United States	Hans Liesche; Germany	George Horine; United States
Pole vault	Harry Babcock; United States	Frank Nelson; United States Marc Wright; United States	William Halpenny; Canada Frank Murphy; United States Bertil Uggla; Sweden
Standing long jump	Konstantinos Tsiklitiras; Greece	Platt Adams; United States	Benjamin Adams; United States
Standing high jump	Platt Adams; United States	Benjamin Adams; United States	Konstantinos Tsiklitiras; Greece
Shot put	Pat McDonald; United States	Ralph Rose; United States	Lawrence Whitney; United States
Discus throw	Armas Taipale; Finland	Richard Byrd; United States	James Duncan; United States
Hammer throw	Matt McGrath; United States	Duncan Gillis; Canada	Clarence Childs; United States
Javelin throw	Eric Lemming; Sweden	Julius Saaristo; Finland	Mór Kóczán; Hungary
Two handed shot put	Ralph Rose; United States	Pat McDonald; United States	Elmer Niklander; Finland
Two handed discus throw	Armas Taipale; Finland	Elmer Niklander; Finland	Emil Magnusson; Sweden
Two handed javelin throw	Julius Saaristo; Finland	Väinö Siikaniemi; Finland	Urho Peltonen; Finland
Pentathlon	Jim Thorpe; United States	Ferdinand Bie; Norway	Frank Lukeman; Canada
Pentathlon	Jim Thorpe; United States	James Donahue; United States	Frank Lukeman; Canada
Decathlon	Jim Thorpe; United States	Hugo Wieslander; Sweden	Gösta Holmér; Sweden
Decathlon	Jim Thorpe; United States	Charles Lomberg; Sweden	Gösta Holmér; Sweden

== Cycling ==
Event	Gold	Silver	Bronze
Individual time trial	Rudolph Lewis; South Africa	Frederick Grubb; Great Britain	Carl Schutte; United States
Team time trial	Sweden; Erik Friborg; Ragnar Malm; Axel Persson; Algot Lönn	Great Britain; Frederick Grubb; Leonard Meredith; Charles Moss; William Hammond	United States; Carl Schutte; Alvin Loftes; Albert Krushel; Walter Martin

== Diving ==
=== Men ===
Event	Gold	Silver	Bronze
3 metre springboard	Paul Günther (GER)	Hans Luber (GER)	Kurt Behrens (GER)
10 metre platform	Erik Adlerz (SWE)	Albert Zürner (GER)	Gustaf Blomgren (SWE)
Plain high diving	Erik Adlerz (SWE)	Hjalmar Johansson (SWE)	John Jansson (SWE)

=== Women ===
Event	Gold	Silver	Bronze
10 metre platform	Greta Johansson (SWE)	Lisa Regnell (SWE)	Isabelle White (GBR)

== Equestrian ==
Event	Gold	Silver	Bronze
Individual dressage	Carl Bonde and Emperor (SWE)	Gustaf Adolf Boltenstern and Neptun (SWE)	Hans von Blixen-Finecke and Maggie (SWE)
Individual eventing	Axel Nordlander and Lady Artist (SWE)	Friedrich von Rochow and Idealist (GER)	Jacques Cariou and Cocotte (FRA)
Team eventing	Sweden; Axel Nordlander and Lady Artist; Nils Adlercreutz and Atout; Ernst Casparsson and Irmelin; Henric Horn af Åminne and Omen	Germany; Friedrich von Rochow and Idealist; Richard Graf von Schaesberg-Tannheim and Grundsee; Eduard von Lütcken and Blue Boy; Carl von Moers and May-Queen	United States; Ben Lear and Poppy; John Montgomery and Deceive; Guy Henry and Chiswell; Ephraim Graham and Connie
Individual jumping	Jacques Cariou and Mignon (FRA)	Rabod von Kröcher and Dohna (GER)	Emmanuel de Blommaert and Clomore (BEL)
Team jumping	Sweden; Gustaf Lewenhaupt and Medusa; Gustaf Kilman and Gåtan; Hans von Rosen and Lord Iron; Fredrik Rosencrantz and Drabant	France; Pierre Dufour d'Astafort and Amazone; Jacques Cariou and Mignon; Ernest Meyer and Allons-y; Gaston Seigner and Cocotte	Germany; Sigismund Freyer and Ultimus; Wilhelm Graf von Hohenau and Pretty Girl; Ernst Deloch and Hubertus; Prince Friedrich Karl of Prussia and Gibson Boy

== Fencing ==
Event	Gold	Silver	Bronze
individual foil	Nedo Nadi (ITA)	Pietro Speciale (ITA)	Richard Verderber (AUT)
individual épée	Paul Anspach (BEL)	Ivan Joseph Martin Osiier (DEN)	Philippe le Hardy de Beaulieu (BEL)
team épée	Belgium; Paul Anspach; Henri Anspach; Robert Hennet; Fernand de Montigny; Jacques Ochs; François Rom; Gaston Salmon; Victor Willems	Great Britain; Edgar Seligman; Edgar Amphlett; Robert Montgomerie; Percival Dawson; Arthur Everitt; Sydney Mertineau; Martin Holt	Netherlands; Adrianus de Jong; Willem van Blijenburgh; Jetze Doorman; Leonardus Salomonson; George van Rossem
individual sabre	Jenő Fuchs (HUN)	Béla Békessy (HUN)	Ervin Mészáros (HUN)
team sabre	Hungary; Jenő Fuchs; László Berti; Ervin Mészáros; Dezső Földes; Oszkár Gerde; Zoltán Ozoray Schenker; Péter Tóth; Lajos Werkner	Austria; Richard Verderber; Otto Herschmann; Rudolf Cvetko; Friedrich Golling; Andreas Suttner; Albert Bogen; Reinhold Trampler	Netherlands; Willem van Blijenburgh; George van Rossem; Adrianus de Jong; Jetze Doorman; Dirk Scalongne; Hendrik de Jongh

== Football ==
Gold	Silver	Bronze
Great Britain; Arthur Berry; Ronald Brebner; Thomas Burn; Joseph Dines; Edward Hanney; Gordon Hoare; Arthur Knight; Henry Littlewort; Douglas McWhirter; Ivan Sharpe; Harold Stamper; Harold Walden; Vivian Woodward; Gordon Wright The Great Britain squad	Denmark; Paul Berth; Charles Buchwald; Hjalmar Christoffersen; Harald Hansen; Sophus Hansen; Emil Jørgensen; Ivar Lykke; Nils Middelboe; Oskar Nielsen; Poul Nielsen; Sophus Nielsen; Anthon Olsen; Axel Petersen; Axel Thufason; Vilhelm Wolfhagen Denmark squad	Netherlands; Piet Bouman; Joop Boutmy; Nico Bouvy; Huug de Groot; Bok de Korver; Nico de Wolf; Constant Feith; Ge Fortgens; Just Göbel; Dirk Lotsy; Caesar ten Cate; Jan van Breda Kolff; Jan van der Sluis; Jan Vos; David Wijnveldt Netherlands squad

== Gymnastics ==
Event	Gold	Silver	Bronze
Men's all-around, individual	Alberto Braglia; Italy	Louis Ségura; France	Adolfo Tunesi; Italy
Men's all-around, team	Italy; Pietro Bianchi; Guido Boni; Alberto Braglia; Giuseppe Domenichelli; Carlo Fregosi; Alfredo Gollini; Francesco Loi; Luigi Maiocco; Giovanni Mangiante; Lorenzo Mangiante; Serafino Mazzarochi; Guido Romano; Paolo Salvi; Luciano Savorini; Adolfo Tunesi; Giorgio Zampori; Umberto Zanolini; Angelo Zorzi	Hungary; József Bittenbinder; Imre Erdődy; Samu Fóti; Imre Gellért; Győző Haberfeld; Ottó Hellmich; István Herczeg; József Keresztessy; Lajos Kmetykó; János Krizmanich; Elemér Pászti; Árpád Pédery; Jenõ Rittich; Ferenc Szüts; Ödön Téry; Géza Tuli	Great Britain; Albert Betts; William Cowhig; Sidney Cross; Harold Dickason; Herbert Drury; Bernard Franklin; Leonard Hanson; Samuel Hodgetts; Charles Luck; William MacKune; Ronald McLean; Alfred Messenger; Henry Oberholzer; Edward Pepper; Edward Potts; Reginald Potts; George Ross; Charles Simmons; Arthur Southern; William Titt; Charles Vigurs; Samuel Walker; John Whitaker
Men's team, free system	Norway; Isak Abrahamsen; Hans Beyer; Hartmann Bjørnsen; Alfred Engelsen; Bjarne Johnsen; Sigurd Jørgensen; Knud Leonard Knudsen; Alf Lie; Rolf Lie; Tor Lund; Petter Martinsen; Per Mathiesen; Jacob Opdahl; Nils Opdahl; Bjarne Pettersen; Frithjof Sælen; Øistein Schirmer; Georg Selenius; Sigvard Sivertsen; Robert Sjursen; Einar Strøm; Gabriel Thorstensen; Thomas Thorstensen; Nils Voss	Finland; Kaarlo Ekholm; Eino Forsström; Eero Hyvärinen; Mikko Hyvärinen; Tauno Ilmoniemi; Ilmari Keinänen; Jalmari Kivenheimo; Karl Lund; Aarne Pelkonen; Ilmari Pernaja; Arvid Rydman; Eino Saastamoinen; Aarne Salovaara; Heikki Sammallahti; Hannes Sirola; Klaus Suomela; Lauri Tanner; Väinö Tiiri; Kaarlo Vähämäki; Kaarlo Vasama	Denmark; Axel Andersen; Hjalmart Andersen; Halvor Birch; Wilhelm Grimmelmann; Arvor Hansen; Christian Hansen; Marius Hansen; Charles Jensen; Hjalmar Peter Johansen; Poul Jørgensen; Carl Krebs; Vigo Madsen; Lukas Nielsen; Rikard Nordstrøm; Steen Olsen; Oluf Olsson; Carl Pedersen; Oluf Pedersen; Niels Petersen; Christian Svendsen
Men's team, Swedish system	Sweden; Per Bertilsson; Carl-Ehrenfried Carlberg; Nils Granfelt; Curt Hartzell; Oswald Holmberg; Anders Hylander; Axel Janse; Boo Kullberg; Sven Landberg; Per Nilsson; Benkt Norelius; Axel Norling; Daniel Norling; Sven Rosén; Nils Silfverskiöld; Carl Silfverstrand; John Sörenson; Yngve Stiernspetz; Carl-Erik Svensson; Karl Johan Svensson; Knut Torell; Edward Wennerholm; Claës-Axel Wersäll; David Wiman	Denmark; Peter Andersen; Valdemar Bøggild; Søren Peter Christensen; Ingvald Eriksen; George Falcke; Torkild Garp; Hans Trier Hansen; Johannes Hansen; Rasmus Hansen; Jens Kristian Jensen; Søren Alfred Jensen; Karl Kirk; Jens Kirkegaard; Olaf Kjems; Carl Larsen; Jens Peter Laursen; Marius Lefèrve; Povl Mark; Einar Olsen; Hans Pedersen; Hans Eiler Pedersen; Olaf Pedersen; Peder Larsen Pedersen; Aksel Sørensen; Martin Thau; Søren Thorborg; Kristen Vadgaard; Johannes Vinther	Norway; Arthur Amundsen; Jørgen Andersen; Trygve Bøyesen; Georg Brustad; Conrad Christensen; Oscar Engelstad; Marius Eriksen; Axel Henry Hansen; Petter Hol; Eugen Ingebretsen; Olaf Ingebretsen; Olof Jacobsen; Erling Jensen; Thor Jensen; Frithjof Olsen; Oscar Olstad; Edvin Paulsen; Carl Alfred Pedersen; Paul Pedersen; Rolf Robach; Sigurd Smebye; Torleif Torkildsen

== Modern pentathlon ==
Event	Gold	Silver	Bronze
Men's event	Gösta Lillehöök (SWE)	Gösta Åsbrink (SWE)	Georg de Laval (SWE)

== Rowing ==
Event	Gold	Silver	Bronze
single sculls	Wally Kinnear (GBR)	Polydore Veirman (BEL)	Everard Butler (CAN); Mart Kuusik (RUS)
coxed four	Germany; Albert Arnheiter; Hermann Wilker; Rudolf Fickeisen; Otto Fickeisen; Karl Leister (Note: The German team changed the cox after the first round. But it is not known, if Otto Maier participated in the first round and Karl Leister did the rest of the tournament or Karl Leister participated in the first round and Otto Maier did the rest. However, the IOC medal database credits the gold medal only to Karl Leister.)	Great Britain; Julius Beresford; Karl Vernon; Charles Rought; Bruce Logan; Geoffrey Carr	Denmark; Erik Bisgaard; Rasmus Frandsen; Mikael Simonsen; Poul Thymann; Ejgil Clemmensen; Norway; Henry Larsen; Mathias Torstensen; Theodor Klem; Håkon Tønsager; Ejnar Tønsager
coxed four, inriggers	Denmark; Ejler Allert; Christian Hansen; Carl Møller; Carl Pedersen; Poul Hartmann	Sweden; Ture Rosvall; William Bruhn-Möller; Conrad Brunkman; Herman Dahlbäck; Leo Wilkens	Norway; Claus Høyer; Reidar Holter; Max Herseth; Frithjof Olstad; Olav Bjørnstad
eights	Great Britain; Leander Edgar Burgess; Sidney Swann; Leslie Wormald; Ewart Horsfall; James Angus Gillan; Stanley Garton; Alister Kirby; Philip Fleming; Henry Wells	Great Britain; New College, Oxford William Fison; William Parker; Thomas Gillespie; Beaufort Burdekin; Frederick Pitman; Arthur Wiggins; Charles Littlejohn; Robert Bourne; John Walker	Germany; Berlin Otto Liebing; Max Bröske; Max Vetter; Willi Bartholomae; Fritz Bartholomae; Werner Dehn; Rudolf Reichelt; Hans Matthiae; Kurt Runge

== Sailing ==
Event	Gold	Silver	Bronze
1912: 6 Metre	France (FRA); Gaston Thubé; Amédée Thubé; Jacques Thubé	Denmark (DEN); Hans Meulengracht-Madsen; Steen Herschend; Sven Thomsen	Sweden (SWE); Eric Sandberg; Otto Aust; Harald Sandberg
1912: 8 Metre	Norway (NOR); Thoralf Glad; Thomas Aas; Andreas Brecke; Torleiv Corneliussen; Christian Jebe	Sweden (SWE); Bengt Heyman; Emil Henriques; Alvar Thiel; Herbert Westermark; Nils Westermark	Finland (FIN); Bertil Tallberg; Arthur Ahnger; Emil Lindh; Gunnar Tallberg; Georg Westling
1912: 10 Metre	Sweden (SWE); Filip Ericsson; Carl Hellström; Paul Isberg; Humbert Lundén; Herman Nyberg; Harry Rosenswärd; Erik Wallerius; Harald Wallin	Finland (FIN); Harry Wahl; Waldemar Björkstén; Jacob Björnström; Bror Brenner; Allan Franck; Erik Lindh; Juho Aarne Pekkalainen	Russia (RUS); Esper Beloselsky; Ernest Brasche; Karl Lindholm; Nikolay Pushnitsky; Aleksandr Rodionov; Iosif Shomaker; Philipp Strauch
1912: 12 Metre	Norway (NOR); Johan Anker; Nils Bertelsen; Eilert Falch-Lund; Halfdan Hansen; Arnfinn Heje; Magnus Konow; Alfred Larsen; Petter Larsen; Christian Staib; Carl Thaulow	Sweden (SWE); Nils Persson; Per Bergman; Dick Bergström; Kurt Bergström; Hugo Clason; Folke Johnson; Sigurd Kander; Ivan Lamby; Erik Lindqvist; Hugo Sällström	Finland (FIN); Ernst Krogius; Ferdinand Alfthan; Pekka Hartvall; Jarl Hulldén; Sigurd Juslén; Eino Sandelin; Johan Silén

== Shooting ==
Event	Gold	Silver	Bronze
30 m rapid fire pistol	Alfred Lane (USA)	Paul Palén (SWE)	Johan Hübner von Holst (SWE)
50 m free pistol, individual	Alfred Lane (USA)	Peter Dolfen (USA)	Charles Stewart (GBR)
50 m free pistol, team	United States; John Dietz; Peter Dolfen; Alfred Lane; Harry Sears	Sweden; Erik Boström; Eric Carlberg; Vilhelm Carlberg; Georg de Laval	Great Britain; Hugh Durant; Albert Kempster; Horatio Poulter; Charles Stewart
50 m rifle, prone	Frederick Hird; United States	William Milne; Great Britain	Henry Burt; Great Britain
Team free rifle	Sweden; Carl Björkman; Erik Blomqvist; Mauritz Eriksson; Hugo Johansson; Gustaf Adolf Jonsson; Bernhard Larsson	Norway; Albert Helgerud; Einar Liberg; Østen Østensen; Olaf Sæther; Ole Sæther; Gudbrand Skatteboe	Denmark; Niels Andersen; Jens Hajslund; Laurits Larsen; Niels Larsen; Lars Jørgen Madsen; Hugo Johansson
30 m military pistol, team	Sweden; Eric Carlberg; Vilhelm Carlberg; Johan Hübner von Holst; Paul Palén	Russia; Amos Kash; Nikolai Melnitsky; Grigori Panteleimonov; Pavel Voyloshnikov	Great Britain; Hugh Durant; Albert Kempster; Horatio Poulter; Charles Stewart
300 m free rifle, three positions	Paul Colas; France	Lars Jørgen Madsen; Denmark	Niels Larsen; Denmark
600 m free rifle	Paul Colas; France	Carl Osburn; United States	John Jackson; United States
300 m military rifle, three positions	Sándor Prokopp; Hungary	Carl Osburn; United States	Engebret Skogen; Norway
Team military rifle	United States; Harry Adams; Allan Briggs; Cornelius Burdette; John Jackson; Carl Osburn; Warren Sprout	Great Britain; Henry Burr; Arthur Fulton; Harcourt Ommundsen; Edward Parnell; James Reid; Edward Skilton	Sweden; Carl Björkman; Tönnes Björkman; Mauritz Eriksson; Werner Jernström; Ole Olsen; Bernhard Larsson
25 m small-bore rifle	Vilhelm Carlberg; Sweden	Johan Hübner von Holst; Sweden	Gideon Ericsson; Sweden
25 m team small-bore rifle	Sweden; Gustaf Boivie; Eric Carlberg; Vilhelm Carlberg; Johan Hübner von Holst	Great Britain; William Milne; Joseph Pepé; William Pimm; William Styles	United States; Frederick Hird; William Leushner; William McDonnell; Warren Sprout
50 m team small-bore rifle	Great Britain; Edward Lessimore; Robert Murray; Joseph Pepé; William Pimm	Sweden; Eric Carlberg; Vilhelm Carlberg; Arthur Nordenswan; Ruben Örtegren	United States; Frederick Hird; William Leushner; Carl Osburn; Warren Sprout
100 m running deer, single shots	Alfred Swahn; Sweden	Åke Lundeberg; Sweden	Nestori Toivonen; Finland
100 m running deer, double shots	Åke Lundeberg; Sweden	Edward Benedicks; Sweden	Oscar Swahn; Sweden
100 m team running deer, single shots	Sweden; Per-Olof Arvidsson; Åke Lundeberg; Alfred Swahn; Oscar Swahn	United States; William Leushner; William Libbey; William McDonnell; Walter Winans	Finland; Axel Fredrik Londen; Ernst Rosenqvist; Nestori Toivonen; Iivar Väänänen
Trap	James Graham; United States	Alfred Goeldel; Germany	Harry Blau; Russia
Trap, team	United States; Charles Billings; Edward Gleason; James Graham; Frank Hall; John H. Hendrickson; Ralph Spotts	Great Britain; John Butt; William Grosvenor; Harold Humby; Alexander Maunder; Charles Palmer; George Whitaker	Germany; Alfred Goeldel; Horst Goeldel; Erland Koch; Albert Preuß; Erich Graf von Bernstorff; Franz von Zedlitz und Leipe

== Swimming ==
=== Men's events ===
Event	Gold	Silver	Bronze
100 m freestyle	Duke Kahanamoku; United States	Cecil Healy; Australasia	Ken Huszagh; United States
400 m freestyle	George Hodgson; Canada	John Hatfield; Great Britain	Harold Hardwick; Australasia
1500 m freestyle	George Hodgson; Canada	John Hatfield; Great Britain	Harold Hardwick; Australasia
100 m backstroke	Harry Hebner; United States	Otto Fahr; Germany	Paul Kellner; Germany
200 m breaststroke	Walter Bathe; Germany	Wilhelm Lützow; Germany	Paul Malisch; Germany
400 m breaststroke	Walter Bathe; Germany	Thor Henning; Sweden	Percy Courtman; Great Britain
4×200 m freestyle relay	Australasia; Cecil Healy; Malcolm Champion; Leslie Boardman; Harold Hardwick	United States; Ken Huszagh; Harry Hebner; Perry McGillivray; Duke Kahanamoku	Great Britain; William Foster; Thomas Battersby; John Hatfield; Henry Taylor

=== Women's events ===
Event	Gold	Silver	Bronze
100 m freestyle	Fanny Durack; Australasia	Wilhelmina Wylie; Australasia	Jennie Fletcher; Great Britain
4×100 m freestyle relay	Great Britain; Belle Moore; Jennie Fletcher; Annie Speirs; Irene Steer	Germany; Wally Dressel; Louise Otto; Hermine Stindt; Grete Rosenberg	Austria; Margarete Adler; Klara Milch; Josephine Sticker; Berta Zahourek

== Tennis ==
=== Men's events ===
Event	Gold	Silver	Bronze
Men's singles outdoor	Charles Winslow; South Africa	Harold Kitson; South Africa	Oscar Kreuzer; Germany
Men's singles indoor	André Gobert; France	Charles Dixon; Great Britain	Anthony Wilding; Australasia
Men's doubles outdoor	Harold Kitson and Charles Winslow; South Africa	Felix Pipes and Arthur Zborzil; Austria	Albert Canet and Edouard Mény de Marangue; France
Men's doubles indoor	Maurice Germot and André Gobert; France	Carl Kempe and Gunnar Setterwall; Sweden	Alfred Beamish and Charles Dixon; Great Britain

=== Women's events ===
Event	Gold	Silver	Bronze
Women's singles outdoor	Marguerite Broquedis; France	Dorothea Koring; Germany	Molla Bjurstedt; Norway
Women's singles indoor	Edith Hannam; Great Britain	Sofie Castenschiold; Denmark	Mabel Parton; Great Britain

=== Mixed events ===
Event	Gold	Silver	Bronze
Mixed doubles outdoor	Dorothea Koring and Heinrich Schomburgk; Germany	Sigrid Fick and Gunnar Setterwall; Sweden	Marguerite Broquedis and Albert Canet; France
Mixed doubles indoor	Edith Hannam and Charles Dixon; Great Britain	Helen Aitchison and Herbert Roper Barrett; Great Britain	Sigrid Fick and Gunnar Setterwall; Sweden

== Tug of war ==
Gold	Silver	Bronze
Sweden; Stockholm Police Arvid Andersson; Adolf Bergman; Johan Edman; Erik Algot Fredriksson; Carl Jonsson; Erik Larsson; August Gustafsson; Herbert Lindström	Great Britain; City of London Police Alexander Munro; John Sewell; John James Shepherd; Joseph Dowler; Edwin Mills; Frederick Humphreys; Mathias Hynes; Walter Chaffe	

== Water polo ==
Gold	Silver	Bronze
Great Britain Charles Sydney Smith; George Cornet; George Wilkinson; Charles Bugbee; Arthur Edwin Hill; Paul Radmilovic; Isaac Bentham	Sweden Torsten Kumfeldt; Harald Julin; Max Gumpel; Robert Andersson; Pontus Hanson; Vilhelm Andersson; Erik Bergqvist	Belgium Albert Durant; Herman Donners; Victor Boin; Herman Meyboom; Joseph Pletinckx; Oscar Grégoire; Félicien Courbet; Jean Hoffman; Pierre Nijs

== Wrestling ==
Event	Gold	Silver	Bronze
featherweight	Kaarlo Koskelo (FIN)	Georg Gerstäcker (GER)	Otto Lasanen (FIN)
lightweight	Emil Väre (FIN)	Gustaf Malmström (SWE)	Edvin Mattiasson (SWE)
middleweight	Claes Johanson (SWE)	Martin Klein (RUS)	Alfred Asikainen (FIN)
light heavyweight	none awarded	Anders Ahlgren (SWE)	Béla Varga (HUN)
light heavyweight	none awarded	Ivar Böhling (FIN)	Béla Varga (HUN)
heavyweight	Yrjö Saarela (FIN)	Johan Olin (FIN)	Søren Marinus Jensen (DEN)

== See also ==
- 1912 Summer Olympics medal table
