= Gymnastics at the 1912 Summer Olympics =

Gymnastics at the Games of the V Olympiad
- Dates: 6–15 July 1912

Four gymnastics events for men were contested at the 1912 Summer Olympics in Stockholm, Sweden. No women's competitions were held, though women did participate in non-competitive gymnastic displays. Including the displays, the events were held between 6 and 15 July 1912. All events took place in the Olympiastadion.

== Amateur definitions ==
The definition for the gymnastic competitions was:

An amateur is one:

- who has never, for pecuniary gain, taken part in a public competition or display;
- who has never taken part in a competition for money prizes;
- who, in all other respects, is an amateur according to the rules of his own country.

Gymnastic teachers and leaders, even though they receive payment as such, are regarded as amateurs.

== Medal summary ==
Event	Gold	Silver	Bronze
Men's all-around, individual	Alberto Braglia; Italy	Louis Ségura; France	Adolfo Tunesi; Italy
Men's all-around, team	Italy; Pietro Bianchi; Guido Boni; Alberto Braglia; Giuseppe Domenichelli; Carlo Fregosi; Alfredo Gollini; Francesco Loi; Luigi Maiocco; Giovanni Mangiante; Lorenzo Mangiante; Serafino Mazzarochi; Guido Romano; Paolo Salvi; Luciano Savorini; Adolfo Tunesi; Giorgio Zampori; Umberto Zanolini; Angelo Zorzi	Hungary; József Bittenbinder; Imre Erdődy; Samu Fóti; Imre Gellért; Győző Haberfeld; Ottó Hellmich; István Herczeg; József Keresztessy; Lajos Kmetykó; János Krizmanich; Elemér Pászti; Árpád Pédery; Jenõ Rittich; Ferenc Szüts; Ödön Téry; Géza Tuli	Great Britain; Albert Betts; William Cowhig; Sidney Cross; Harold Dickason; Herbert Drury; Bernard Franklin; Leonard Hanson; Samuel Hodgetts; Charles Luck; William MacKune; Ronald McLean; Alfred Messenger; Henry Oberholzer; Edward Pepper; Edward Potts; Reginald Potts; George Ross; Charles Simmons; Arthur Southern; William Titt; Charles Vigurs; Samuel Walker; John Whitaker
Men's team, free system	Norway; Isak Abrahamsen; Hans Beyer; Hartmann Bjørnsen; Alfred Engelsen; Bjarne Johnsen; Sigurd Jørgensen; Knud Leonard Knudsen; Alf Lie; Rolf Lie; Tor Lund; Petter Martinsen; Per Mathiesen; Jacob Opdahl; Nils Opdahl; Bjarne Pettersen; Frithjof Sælen; Øistein Schirmer; Georg Selenius; Sigvard Sivertsen; Robert Sjursen; Einar Strøm; Gabriel Thorstensen; Thomas Thorstensen; Nils Voss	Finland; Kaarlo Ekholm; Eino Forsström; Eero Hyvärinen; Mikko Hyvärinen; Tauno Ilmoniemi; Ilmari Keinänen; Jalmari Kivenheimo; Karl Lund; Aarne Pelkonen; Ilmari Pernaja; Arvid Rydman; Eino Saastamoinen; Aarne Salovaara; Heikki Sammallahti; Hannes Sirola; Klaus Suomela; Lauri Tanner; Väinö Tiiri; Kaarlo Vähämäki; Kaarlo Vasama	Denmark; Axel Andersen; Hjalmart Andersen; Halvor Birch; Wilhelm Grimmelmann; Arvor Hansen; Christian Hansen; Marius Hansen; Charles Jensen; Hjalmar Peter Johansen; Poul Jørgensen; Carl Krebs; Vigo Madsen; Lukas Nielsen; Rikard Nordstrøm; Steen Olsen; Oluf Olsson; Carl Pedersen; Oluf Pedersen; Niels Petersen; Christian Svendsen
Men's team, Swedish system	Sweden; Per Bertilsson; Carl-Ehrenfried Carlberg; Nils Granfelt; Curt Hartzell; Oswald Holmberg; Anders Hylander; Axel Janse; Boo Kullberg; Sven Landberg; Per Nilsson; Benkt Norelius; Axel Norling; Daniel Norling; Sven Rosén; Nils Silfverskiöld; Carl Silfverstrand; John Sörenson; Yngve Stiernspetz; Carl-Erik Svensson; Karl Johan Svensson; Knut Torell; Edward Wennerholm; Claës-Axel Wersäll; David Wiman	Denmark; Peter Andersen; Valdemar Bøggild; Søren Peter Christensen; Ingvald Eriksen; George Falcke; Torkild Garp; Hans Trier Hansen; Johannes Hansen; Rasmus Hansen; Jens Kristian Jensen; Søren Alfred Jensen; Karl Kirk; Jens Kirkegaard; Olaf Kjems; Carl Larsen; Jens Peter Laursen; Marius Lefèrve; Povl Mark; Einar Olsen; Hans Pedersen; Hans Eiler Pedersen; Olaf Pedersen; Peder Larsen Pedersen; Jørgen Ravn; Aksel Sørensen; Martin Thau; Søren Thorborg; Kristen Vadgaard; Johannes Vinther	Norway; Arthur Amundsen; Jørgen Andersen; Trygve Bøyesen; Georg Brustad; Conrad Christensen; Oscar Engelstad; Marius Eriksen; Axel Henry Hansen; Petter Hol; Eugen Ingebretsen; Olaf Ingebretsen; Olof Jacobsen; Erling Jensen; Thor Jensen; Frithjof Olsen; Oscar Olstad; Edvin Paulsen; Carl Alfred Pedersen; Paul Pedersen; Rolf Robach; Sigurd Smebye; Torleif Torkildsen

== Participating nations ==
A total of 249 gymnasts from 12 nations competed at the Stockholm Games:

- Bohemia (1)
- Denmark (49)
- Finland (24)
- France (6)
- Great Britain (23)
- Germany (18)
- Hungary (17)
- Italy (18)
- Luxembourg (19)
- Norway (46)
- Russia (4)
- Sweden (24)

== Medal table ==
Rank	Nation	Gold	Silver	Bronze	Total
1	Italy	2	0	1	3
2	Norway	1	0	1	2
3	Sweden	1	0	0	1
4	Denmark	0	1	1	2
5	Finland	0	1	0	1
5	France	0	1	0	1
5	Hungary	0	1	0	1
8	Great Britain	0	0	1	1
Totals (8 entries)		4	4	4	12

== Display ==
Pathé newsreel showing highlights from the 1912 Olympics, including gymnastics

Women did participate in non-competitive gymnastic displays.
