= Bertilsson =

Bertilsson is a surname. Notable people with the surname include:

- Carl Bertilsson (1889–1968), Swedish gymnast who competed in the 1908 Summer Olympics
- Henrik Bertilsson (born 1969), retired Swedish professional football forward
- Johan Bertilsson (born 1988), Swedish footballer
- Per Bertilsson (1892–1972), Swedish gymnast who competed in the 1912 Summer Olympics
- Simon Bertilsson (born 1991), Swedish ice hockey player
- Stig Bertilsson (born 1950), Swedish politician and entrepreneur, member of the Swedish parliament 1987–1996

== See also ==
- Bert Nilsson
