= Ingebretsen =

Ingebretsen is a Norwegian patronymic surname. Notable people with the surname include:

- Bjarne Kortgaard Ingebretsen, Norwegian football midfielder
- Bjørn Petter Ingebretsen (born 1967), Norwegian football coach
- Eugen Ingebretsen (1884–1949), Norwegian gymnast
- Herman Smitt Ingebretsen (1891–1961), Norwegian politician for the Conservative Party
- Olaf Ingebretsen (1892–1971), Norwegian gymnast
- Paul Ingebretsen (1904–1968), Norwegian politician for the Liberal Party
- Robert B. Ingebretsen (1948–2003), American engineer and pioneer in the development of digital sound
