= Gymnastics at the 1912 Summer Olympics – Men's team, Swedish system =

Gymnastics at the Olympics

Men's Swedish system team gymnastics at the Games of the V Olympiad
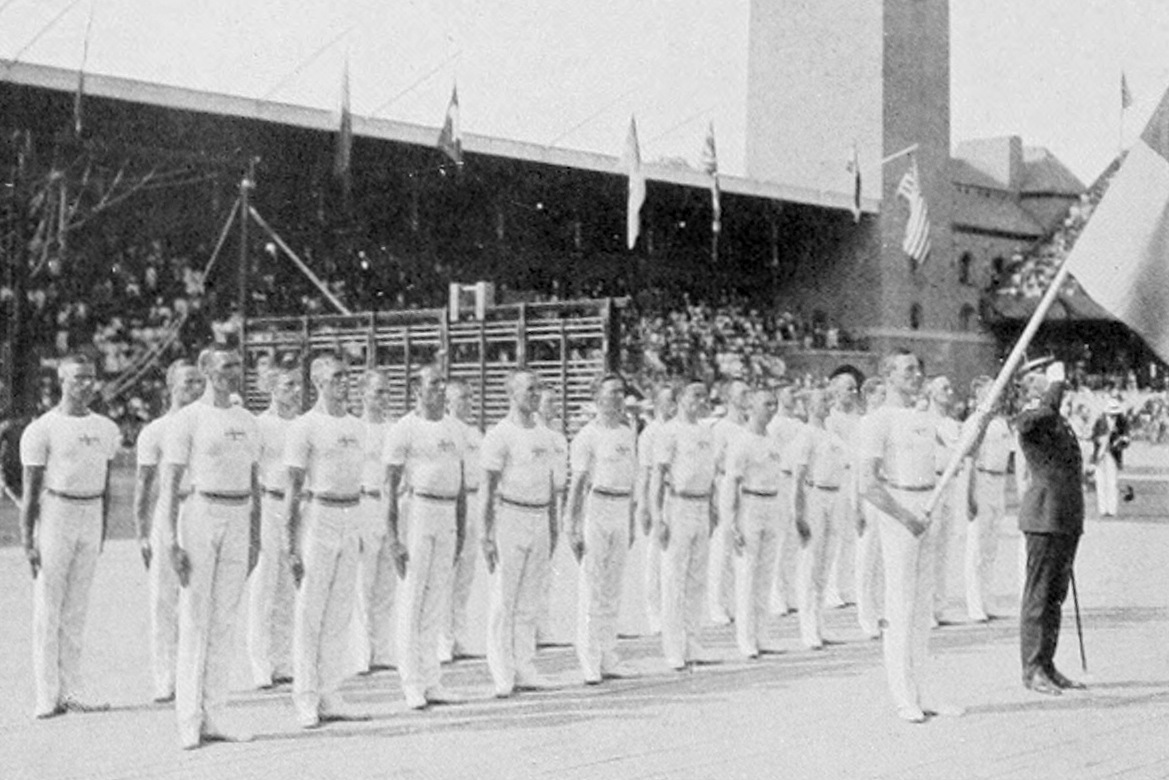
- Swedish team that won the gold medal
- Venue: Stockholm Olympic Stadium
- Date: July 8, 1912
- Competitors: 74 from 3 nations

Medalists
1st place, gold medalist(s)		Sweden
2nd place, silver medalist(s)		Denmark
3rd place, bronze medalist(s)		Norway

The men's team competition in the Swedish system was an artistic gymnastics event held as part of the Gymnastics at the 1912 Summer Olympics programme. It was the first appearance of the event, which would only be held again at the 1920 Summer Olympics. It was one of three team gymnastics events. The others were a team competition in the free system and a standard team competition.

== Medalists ==
Gold	Silver	Bronze
Sweden	Denmark	Norway

== Results ==
Scores are an average of five judges' marks.

Team competition
Place	Team	Score
Gold	Sweden Per Bertilsson; Carl-Ehrenfried Carlberg; Nils Granfelt; Curt Hartzell; Oswald Holmberg; Anders Hylander; Axel Janse; Boo Kullberg; Sven Landberg; Per Nilsson; Benkt Norelius; Axel Norling; Daniel Norling; Sven Rosén; Nils Silfverskiöld; Carl Silfverstrand; John Sörenson; Yngve Stiernspetz; Carl-Erik Svensson; Karl Johan Svensson; Knut Torell; Edward Wennerholm; Claës-Axel Wersäll; David Wiman	937.46
Silver	Denmark Peter Andersen; Valdemar Bøggild; Søren Peter Christensen; Ingvald Eriksen; George Falcke; Torkild Garp; Hans Trier Hansen; Johannes Hansen; Rasmus Hansen; Jens Kristian Jensen; Søren Alfred Jensen; Karl Kirk; Jens Kirkegaard; Olaf Kjems; Carl Larsen; Jens Peter Laursen; Marius Lefèrve; Povl Mark; Einar Olsen; Hans Pedersen; Hans Eiler Pedersen; Olaf Pedersen; Peder Larsen Pedersen; Jørgen Ravn; Aksel Sørensen; Martin Thau; Søren Thorborg; Kristen Vadgaard; Johannes Vinther	898.84
Bronze	Norway Arthur Amundsen; Jørgen Andersen; Trygve Bøyesen; Georg Brustad; Conrad Christensen; Oscar Engelstad; Marius Eriksen; Axel Henry Hansen; Petter Hol; Eugen Ingebretsen; Olaf Ingebretsen; Olof Jacobsen; Erling Jensen; Thor Jensen; Frithjof Olsen; Oscar Olstad; Edvin Paulsen; Carl Alfred Pedersen; Paul Pedersen; Rolf Robach; Sigurd Smebye; Torleif Torkildsen	857.21

== Sources ==
- The Official Report of the Olympic Games of Stockholm 1912. Stockholm: Wahlström & Widstrand. 1913.
- Wudarski, Pawel (1999). "Wyniki Igrzysk Olimpijskich" (in Polish).
