= Boggild =

Boggild or Bøggild may refer to:

- Mogens Bøggild (1901-1987), Danish sculptor
- Valdemar Bøggild (1893-1943), Danish gymnast
- Ove Balthasar Bøggild (1872-1956), Danish mineralogist
- C.O. Bøggild-Andersen (1898-1967), Danish historian
- O.B. Bøggild Fjord, a fjord in North Greenland
