= Robach =

Robach is a surname. Notable people with the surname include:

- Amy Robach (born 1973), American television journalist
- Joseph Robach (born 1958), American politician
- Roger J. Robach (1934–1991), American politician
- Rolf Robach (1885–1963), Norwegian gymnast
