= Engebretsen =

Engebretsen is a Norwegian patronymic surname which may refer to:

- Geir Engebretsen, Norwegian jurist and civil servant
- Jim Engebretsen, American educator at the Marriott School of Management at Brigham Young University
- Kjell Engebretsen, Norwegian politician for the Labour Party
- Paul Engebretsen (1910–1979), American professional football player
- Heather Engebretson, American lyric soprano

== See also ==
- Ingebretsen
