= Lawrence Whitney =

American shot putter and discus thrower

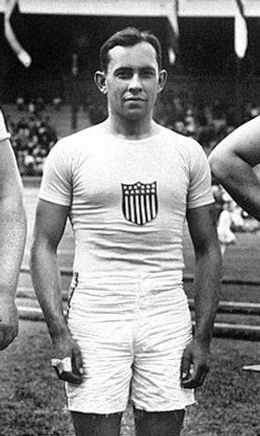
- Whitney at the 1912 Olympics.

Personal information
- Born: Lawrence Atwood Whitney; February 2, 1891 Millbury, Massachusetts, United States
- Died: April 24, 1941 (aged 50) Boston, Massachusetts, United States
- Education: Dartmouth College
- Height: 180 cm (5 ft 11 in)
- Weight: 86 kg (190 lb)

Sport
- Country: United States
- Events: Shot put Discus throw

Achievements and titles
- Personal bests: Shot put – 14.64 m (1914); Discus throw – 41.42 m (1913)
Medal record
Representing the United States
Olympic Games
Bronze medal – third place	1912 Stockholm	Shot put

Lawrence Atwood Whitney (February 2, 1891 – April 24, 1941) was an American athlete who competed in the 1912 Summer Olympics.

== Career ==
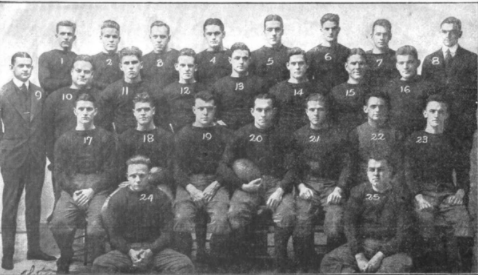
Whitney (upper left), pictured with the rest of the 1914 Dartmouth football team.

Whitney graduated from Worcester Academy in 1911, where he lettered in baseball and basketball, and participated in gymnastics and track and field. He then graduated from Dartmouth College with a Bachelor of Science in 1915, where he competed in track, football as a fullback, and hockey, under coach Fred Rocque. Whitney was the captain of the football team for the 1914 season, under coach Frank Cavanaugh, who also coached at Worcester Academy while Whitney was there. The team had a 8–1 record that year, shutting out six of their opponents. Whitney, who wore No. 1, earned College Football All-America Team honors in both 1913 and 1914. He was awarded the Kenneth Archibald Prize for his athletic achievements by Dartmouth, alongside Clarence Wanamaker, in 1915.

Whitney competed in the 1912 Summer Olympics in Sweden. On July 10, he won the bronze medal in the men's shot put, behind Pat McDonald and Ralph Rose, completing an American podium sweep. Whitney also competed in the men's two-handed shot put, finishing 4th, and the men's discus throw, finishing 20th. He also competed in baseball, which was the sport's first appearance as a demonstration, playing right field against Sweden in a 13–3 win. Whitney recorded one at-bat and one run scored.

In 1913, Whitney won the IC4A shot put title, as well as the USA Outdoor Track and Field Championships, organized by USA Track & Field, as part of the Amateur Athletic Union. Two years later, he won the same IC4A event again. He retired shortly thereafter.

From 1915 to 1917, Whitney served as assistant football coach for the Penn State Nittany Lions, under coach Dick Harlow. He stepped down from the position to serve in the United States Army during World War I until 1919.

== Personal life ==
A native of Millbury, Whitney, who also went by the nickname "Bud," was born to Walter Lincoln and Martha Horton. On January 26, 1946, Whitney married Katherine Brewster Gray in Boston. He had one stepson: Converse Gray Fenn, who also graduated from Dartmouth in 1938.

Whitney died in Boston in 1941, and was buried in Forest Hills Cemetery there.

In 1984, Whitney was posthumously inducted into the Dartmouth College Wearers of Green Hall of Fame.

== See also ==
- List of 1912 Summer Olympics medal winners
- List of Dartmouth College alumni
- List of medal sweeps in Olympic athletics
- List of Olympic medalists in athletics (men)
- List of USA Outdoor Track and Field Championships winners (women)
