= Andreas Hagelund =

Norwegian artistic gymnast

- Born: 15 November 1881 Fredrikshald, United Kingdoms of Sweden and Norway
- Died: 19 September 1967 (aged 85) Fredrikstad, Norway

Gymnastics career
- Discipline: Men's artistic gymnastics
- Country represented: Norway
- Gym: Fredrikshalds Turnforening
Medal record
Men's artistic gymnastics
Representing Norway
Intercalated Games
| Gold medal – first place | 1906 Athens | Team |

Andreas Hagelund (15 November 1881 – 19 September 1967) was a Norwegian gymnast who competed in the 1906 Summer Olympics.

In 1906 he won the gold medal as member of the Norwegian gymnastics team in the team competition. He was born in Fredrikshald and died in Fredrikstad, and represented the club Fredrikshalds TF.
