= Fredrikshalds TF =

Norwegian gymnastics club

Fredrikshalds Turnforening is a Norwegian gymnastics club from Halden, founded on 27 August 1879.

Four Olympic gymnasts have represented the club: gold medalist in 1906 Andreas Hagelund, silver and bronze medalist in 1908 and 1912 Paul Pedersen, silver medalist in 1908 Harald Hansen, and gold medalist in 1912 Frithjof Sælen.
