= Jørgen Ravn (gymnast) =

Danish gymnast (1884–1962)

- Full name: Jørgen Christian Jensen Ravn
- Born: 9 January 1884 Horbelev, Denmark
- Died: 1 December 1962 (aged 78) Silkeborg, Denmark

Gymnastics career
- Discipline: Men's artistic gymnastics
- Country represented: Denmark
Medal record
Men's artistic gymnastics
Representing Denmark
Olympic Games
Silver medal – second place	1912 Stockholm	Team, Swedish system

Jørgen Christian Jensen Ravn (9 January 1884 – 1 December 1962) was a Danish gymnast. He competed in the men's team, Swedish system event at the 1912 Summer Olympics, winning a silver medal.
