= Carl Bertilsson =

Swedish artistic gymnast

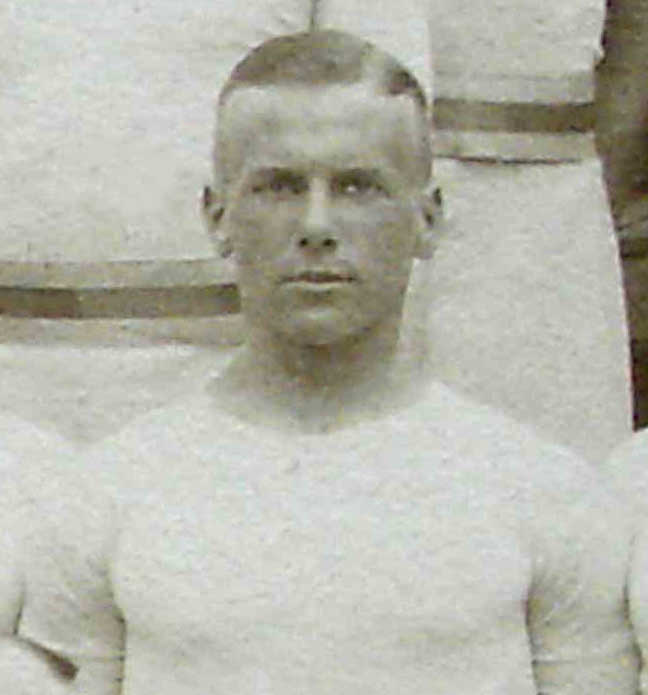
- Bertilsson c. 1908

Personal information
- Full name: Carl Adolf Hjalmar Bertilsson
- Born: 18 October 1889 Drängsered, United Kingdoms of Sweden and Norway
- Died: 16 November 1968 (aged 79) Vånga, Sweden
- Relatives: Per Bertilsson (brother)

Gymnastics career
- Discipline: Men's artistic gymnastics
- Country represented: Sweden
- Gym: Göteborgs Gymnastikförening
Medal record
Men's artistic gymnastics
Representing Sweden
Olympic Games
Gold medal – first place	1908 London	Team

Carl Adolf Hjalmar Bertilsson (18 October 1889 – 16 November 1968) was a Swedish gymnast who competed in the 1908 Summer Olympics. He was a member of the Swedish team that won the all-around gold medal.
