= Lipové =

Lipové Zsemlékes
- Municipality
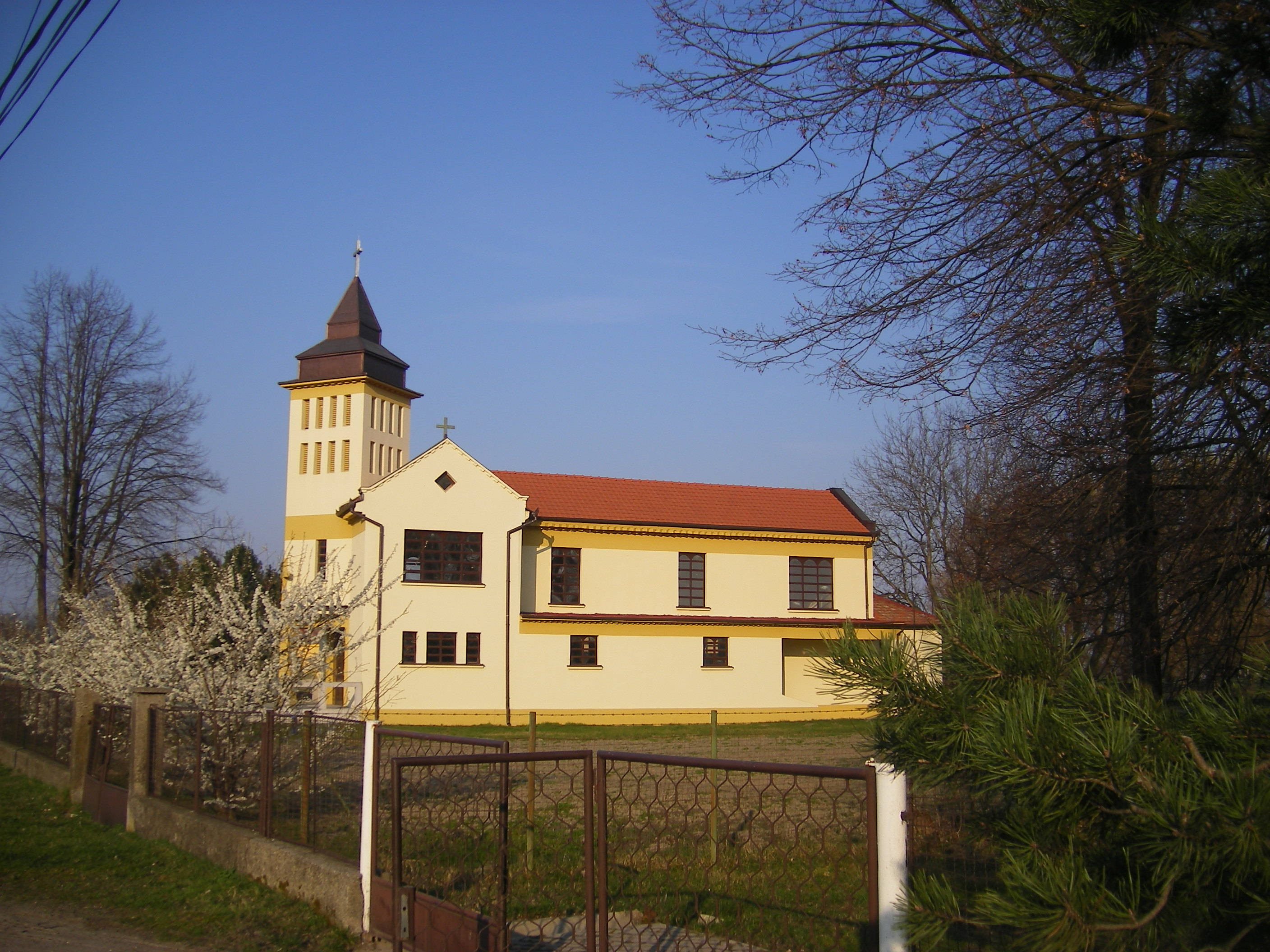
- Church of the Assumption of the Virgin Mary

- Flag Coat of arms

- Location of Lipové in the Nitra Region Location of Lipové in Slovakia
- Coordinates: 47.83°N 17.85°E
- Country: Slovakia
- Region: Nitra Region
- District: Komárno District
- First mentioned: 1926

Area
  - Total: 10.57 km^{2} (4.08 sq mi)
- Elevation: 109 m (358 ft)

Population (2025)
  - Total: 161
- Time zone: UTC+1 (CET)
  - Summer (DST): UTC+2 (CEST)
- Postal code: 946 14
- Area code: +421 35
- Vehicle registration plate (until 2022): KN
- Website: www.lipove.sk

Lipové (Hungarian: Zsemlékes, pronounced: [ˈʒɛmleːkɛʃ]), known from 1926 to 1950 as Hodžovo (Hungarian: Hodzsafalva), is a village and municipality in the Komárno District in the Nitra Region of south-west Slovakia.

== Geography ==
The municipality lies at an altitude of 109 metres (358 ft) and covers an area of 10.57 km^{2} (4.08 sq mi) (2025).

== History ==
In the 9th century, the territory of Lipové became part of the Kingdom of Hungary. In historical records the village was first mentioned in 1245. After the Austro-Hungarian army disintegrated in November 1918, Czechoslovak troops occupied the area, later acknowledged internationally by the Treaty of Trianon. The village was created in 1926. Between 1938 and 1945 territory of Lipové once more became part of Miklós Horthy's Hungary through the First Vienna Award. From 1945 until the Velvet Divorce, it was part of Czechoslovakia. Since then it has been part of Slovakia.

== Population ==
Population statistic (10 years)
Year	1995	2005	2015	2025
Count	202	176	140	161
Difference		−12.87%	−20.45%	+15%

Population statistic
Year	2024	2025
Count	148	161
Difference		+8.78%

It has a population of 161 people (31 December 2025).

=== Ethnicity ===
Census 2021 (1+ %)
Ethnicity	Number	Fraction
Slovak	116	81.69%
Hungarian	18	12.67%
Czech	5	3.52%
Not found out	5	3.52%
Total	142	

In year 2021 was 142 people by ethnicity 116 as Slovak, 18 as Hungarian, 5 as Czech, 5 as Not found out, 1 as Ukrainian, 1 as Polish and 1 as Moravian.

Note on population: The difference values of population numbers in the table "Population statistic" and in the sections "Ethnicity" & "Religion" is caused by the use of various statistical methods.

=== Religion ===
Census 2021 (1+ %)
Religion	Number	Fraction
None	48	33.8%
Roman Catholic Church	41	28.87%
Evangelical Church	32	22.54%
Calvinist Church	12	8.45%
Not found out	4	2.82%
Total	142	

In year 2021 was 142 people by religion 48 from None, 41 from Roman Catholic Church, 32 from Evangelical Church, 12 from Calvinist Church, 4 from Not found out, 1 from Old Catholic Church, 1 from Jehovah's Witnesses, 1 from Christian Congregations in Slovakia, 1 from Greek Catholic Church and 1 from Ad hoc movements.

== Facilities ==
The village has a public library and a football pitch.
