= Samu Fóti =

Hungarian gymnast (1890–1916)

- Born: 17 May 1890 Budapest
- Died: 17 June 1916 (aged 26) Lipové

Gymnastics career
- Discipline: Men's artistic gymnastics
- Country represented: Hungary
Medal record
Olympic Games
Silver medal – second place	1912 Stockholm	Team, european system

Samu Fóti (17 May 1890 in Budapest – 17 June 1916 in Lipové) was a Hungarian gymnast who competed in the 1912 Summer Olympics. He was Jewish.

He was part of the Hungarian team, which won the silver medal in the gymnastics men's team, European system event in 1912. He also competed in the men's discus throw at the 1912 Summer Olympics.

He was killed in action during World War I.

== See also ==
- List of select Jewish gymnasts
