= Kristen Vadgaard =

Gymnast

- Full name: Kristen Møller Vadgaard
- Born: 2 June 1886 Stenild, Denmark
- Died: 16 February 1979 (aged 92) Gjern, Denmark

Gymnastics career
- Discipline: Men's artistic gymnastics
- Country represented: Denmark
Medal record
Men's artistic gymnastics
Representing Denmark
Olympic Games
Silver medal – second place	1912 Stockholm	Team, Swedish system

Kristen Møller Vadgaard (2 June 1886 in Stenild, Denmark – 16 February 1979 in Gjern, Denmark) was a Danish gymnast who competed in the 1912 Summer Olympics. He was part of the Danish team, which won the silver medal in the gymnastics men's team, Swedish system event.
