= Géza Tuli =

Hungarian gymnast (1888–1966)

- Full name: Géza Titusz Tuli
- Born: January 4, 1888 Budapest
- Died: January 30, 1966 (aged 78) Budapest

Gymnastics career
- Discipline: Men's artistic gymnastics
- Country represented: Hungary
Medal record
Olympic Games
Silver medal – second place	1912 Stockholm	Team, european system

Géza Titusz Tuli (January 4, 1888 in Budapest – January 30, 1966 in Budapest) was a Hungarian gymnast who competed in the 1912 Summer Olympics. He was part of the Hungarian team, which won the silver medal in the gymnastics men's team, European system event in 1912.
