= Karl Kirk =

Gymnast

- Born: 5 April 1890 Sønder Nærå, Denmark
- Died: 6 March 1955 (aged 64) Aarhus, Denmark

Gymnastics career
- Discipline: Men's artistic gymnastics
- Country represented: Denmark
Medal record
Men's artistic gymnastics
Representing Denmark
Olympic Games
Silver medal – second place	1912 Stockholm	Team, Swedish system

Karl Kirk (5 April 1890 in Sønder Nærå, Denmark – 6 March 1955 in Aarhus, Denmark) was a Danish gymnast who competed in the 1912 Summer Olympics. He was part of the Danish team, which won the silver medal in the gymnastics men's team, Swedish system event.

He worked as a teacher and later principal at Eriksminde Efterskole from 1916 until his death in 1955.
