= Benkt Norelius =

Swedish artistic gymnast (1886–1974)

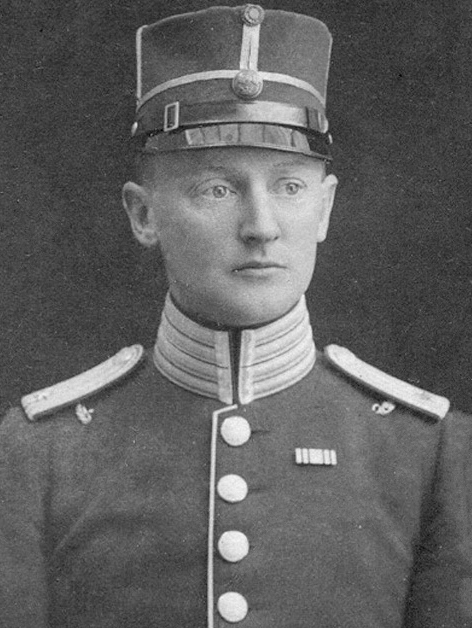
- Norelius c. 1912

Personal information
- Full name: Benkt Rudolf Norelius
- Born: 26 April 1886 Umeå, United Kingdoms of Sweden and Norway
- Died: 30 November 1974 (aged 88) Linköping, Sweden

Gymnastics career
- Discipline: Men's artistic gymnastics
- Country represented: Sweden
- Gym: Norrköpings Gymnastikförening
Medal record
Men's artistic gymnastics
Representing Sweden
Olympic Games
Gold medal – first place	1912 Stockholm	Team, Swedish system

Benkt Rudolf Norelius (26 April 1886 – 30 November 1974) was a Swedish gymnast. He was a member of the Swedish team that won the gold medal in the Swedish system event at the 1912 Summer Olympics.
