= Marius Lefevre =

Danish gymnast

- Full name: Marius Ludvig Lefevre
- Born: 4 May 1875 Odense, Denmark
- Died: 14 March 1958 (aged 82) Gentofte, Denmark

Gymnastics career
- Discipline: Men's artistic gymnastics
- Country represented: Denmark
Medal record
Men's artistic gymnastics
Representing Denmark
Olympic Games
Silver medal – second place	1912 Stockholm	Team, Swedish system

Marius Ludvig Lefevre (4 May 1875 – 14 March 1958) was a Danish gymnast who competed in the 1912 Summer Olympics. He was part of the Danish team that won the silver medal in the gymnastics men's team, in the Swedish system event.
