= Paul Pedersen (gymnast) =

Norwegian artistic gymnast

- Full name: Paul Andreas Pedersen
- Born: 18 September 1886 Fredrikshald, United Kingdoms of Sweden and Norway
- Died: 16 August 1948 (aged 61) Idd, Norway

Gymnastics career
- Discipline: Men's artistic gymnastics
- Country represented: Norway
- Gym: Fredrikshalds TF
Medal record
Men's artistic gymnastics
Representing Norway
Olympic Games
Silver medal – second place	1908 London	Team
Bronze medal – third place	1912 Stockholm	Team, Swedish system

Paul Andreas Pedersen (18 September 1886 – 16 August 1948) was a Norwegian gymnast who competed in the 1908 and 1912 Summer Olympics.

As a member of the Norwegian team, he won a silver medal in the gymnastics team event in 1908. Four years later, he was part of the Norwegian team, which won the bronze medal in the gymnastics team, Swedish system event. He was born in Fredrikshald and died in Idd, and represented the club Fredrikshalds TF.
