= Peder Larsen Pedersen =

Danish artistic gymnast

- Born: 30 November 1880 Stubberup, Denmark
- Died: 20 January 1966 (aged 85) Kerteminde, Denmark

Gymnastics career
- Discipline: Men's artistic gymnastics
- Country represented: Denmark
Medal record
Men's artistic gymnastics
Representing Denmark
Olympic Games
Silver medal – second place	1912 Stockholm	Team, Swedish system

Peder Larsen Pedersen (30 November 1880 – 20 January 1966) was a Danish gymnast who competed in the 1912 Summer Olympics. He was born in Stubberup, and died in Kerteminde. He was part of the Danish team, which won the silver medal in the gymnastics men's team, Swedish system event.
