= Trygve Bøyesen =

Norwegian artistic gymnast

- Full name: Trygve Carlsen Bøyesen
- Born: 15 February 1886 Skien, United Kingdoms of Sweden and Norway
- Died: 27 July 1963 (aged 77) Skien, Norway

Gymnastics career
- Discipline: Men's artistic gymnastics
- Country represented: Norway
- Club: Odds Ballklubb
Medal record
Men's artistic gymnastics
Representing Norway
Olympic Games
Silver medal – second place	1908 London	Team
Silver medal – second place	1920 Antwerp	Team, free system
Bronze medal – third place	1912 Stockholm	Team, Swedish system

Trygve Carlsen Bøyesen (18 February 1886 – 27 July 1963) was a Norwegian gymnast who competed in the 1908 Summer Olympics, the 1912 Summer Olympics, and the 1920 Summer Olympics.

He won a silver medal in the gymnastics team event in 1908 with the Norwegian team. As a member of the Norwegian team, he won a bronze medal in the gymnastics team, Swedish system event in 1912. Eight years later, he was part of the Norwegian team, which won the silver medal in the gymnastics team, free system event.
