= Jens Kirkegaard =

Danish gymnast (1889–1966)

- Born: 1 June 1889 Lindum, Denmark
- Died: 20 April 1966 (aged 76) Randers, Denmark

Gymnastics career
- Discipline: Men's artistic gymnastics
- Country represented: Denmark
Medal record
Men's artistic gymnastics
Representing Denmark
Olympic Games
| Silver medal – second place | 1912 Stockholm | Team, Swedish system |

Jens Kirkgaard (1 June 1889, in Lindum, Denmark – 20 April 1966, in Randers) was a Danish gymnast who competed in the 1912 Summer Olympics. He was part of the Danish team, which won the silver medal in the gymnastics men's team, Swedish system event.
