= Olaf Pedersen (gymnast) =

Gymnast

- Full name: Jens Olaf Pedersen
- Born: 6 July 1884 Stubberup, Denmark
- Died: 6 April 1972 (aged 87) Stubberup, Denmark

Gymnastics career
- Discipline: Men's artistic gymnastics
- Country represented: Denmark
Medal record
Men's artistic gymnastics
Representing Denmark
Olympic Games
Silver medal – second place	1912 Stockholm	Team, Swedish system

Jens Olaf Pedersen (6 July 1884 in Stubberup, Denmark – 6 April 1972 in Stubberup, Denmark) was a Danish gymnast who competed in the 1912 Summer Olympics. He was part of the Danish team, which won the silver medal in the gymnastics men's team, Swedish system event.
