= Søren Peter Christensen =

Danish gymnast

- Born: 30 October 1884 Langskov, Denmark
- Died: 12 October 1927 (aged 42) Faaborg, Denmark

Gymnastics career
- Discipline: Men's artistic gymnastics
- Country represented: Denmark
Medal record
Men's artistic gymnastics
Representing Denmark
Olympic Games
Silver medal – second place	1912 Stockholm	Team, Swedish system

Søren Peter Christensen (30 October 1884 in Langskov, Denmark – 12 October 1927 in Faaborg, Denmark) was a Danish gymnast who competed in the 1912 Summer Olympics. He was part of the Danish team, which won the silver medal in the gymnastics men's team, Swedish system event. The tournament was contested by three teams.

Professionally, he was engaged in forestry. He was married and had three kids.

He is buried at Vejle Sogns Kirkegård in Salling herred.
