= Olaf Kjems =

Danish gymnast

- Full name: Olaf Nielsen Kjems
- Born: 31 May 1880 Odder, Denmark
- Died: 11 April 1952 (aged 71) Vester Vedsted, Denmark

Gymnastics career
- Discipline: Men's artistic gymnastics
- Country represented: Denmark
Medal record
Men's artistic gymnastics
Representing Denmark
Olympic Games
Silver medal – second place	1912 Stockholm	Team, Swedish system

Olaf Nielsen Kjems (31 May 1880 in Odder, Denmark – 11 April 1952 in Vester Vedsted, Denmark) was a Danish gymnast who competed in the 1912 Summer Olympics. He was part of the Danish team, which won the silver medal in the gymnastics men's team, Swedish system event.
