= Alfredo Gollini =

Italian artistic gymnast

- Full name: Alfredo Guido Stefano Maria Gollini
- Born: 24 December 1881 Modena, Kingdom of Italy
- Died: 21 April 1957 (aged 75) Modena, Italy

Gymnastics career
- Discipline: Men's artistic gymnastics
- Country represented: Italy
Medal record
Men's artistic gymnastics
Representing Kingdom of Italy
Olympic Games
| Gold medal – first place | 1912 Stockholm | Team |

Alfredo Guido Stefano Maria Gollini (24 December 1881 – 21 April 1957) was an Italian gymnast who competed in the 1912 Summer Olympics. He was part of the Italian team, which won the gold medal in the gymnastics men's team European system event in 1912.
