= Hans Eiler Pedersen =

Gymnast

- Born: 18 October 1890 Skårup, Denmark
- Died: 1 December 1971 (aged 81) Gentofte, Denmark

Gymnastics career
- Discipline: Men's artistic gymnastics
- Country represented: Denmark
Medal record
Men's artistic gymnastics
Representing Denmark
Olympic Games
| Silver medal – second place | 1912 Stockholm | Team, Swedish system |

Hans Eiler Pedersen (18 October 1890 in Skårup, Denmark – 1 December 1971 in Gentofte, Denmark) was a Danish gymnast who competed in the 1912 Summer Olympics. He was part of the Danish team, which won the silver medal in the gymnastics men's team, Swedish system event.
