= Serafino Mazzarocchi =

Italian artistic gymnast

- Born: 7 February 1890 Montegranaro, Kingdom of Italy
- Died: 21 April 1961 (aged 71) Bologna, Italy

Gymnastics career
- Discipline: Men's artistic gymnastics
- Country represented: Italy
- Club: Reale Società Ginnastica Torino
Medal record
Men's artistic gymnastics
Representing Kingdom of Italy
Olympic Games
Gold medal – first place	1912 Stockholm	Team

Serafino Mazzarocchi (2 February 1890 – 21 April 1961) was an Italian gymnast who competed in the 1912 Summer Olympics. He was part of the Italian team, which won the gold medal in the gymnastics men's team, European system event in 1912.
