= Conrad Christensen =

Norwegian artistic gymnast

- Full name: Conrad Adolf Christensen
- Born: 25 January 1882 Kristiania, United Kingdoms of Sweden and Norway
- Died: 30 December 1950 (aged 68) Oslo, Norway

Gymnastics career
- Discipline: Men's artistic gymnastics
- Country represented: Norway
- Gym: Chistiania Turnforening
Medal record
Men's artistic gymnastics
Representing Norway
Olympic Games
Bronze medal – third place	1912 Stockholm	Team, Swedish system

Conrad Adolf Christensen (25 January 1882 – 30 December 1950) was a Norwegian gymnast who competed in the 1912 Summer Olympics. He was part of the Norwegian gymnastics team, which won the bronze medal in the gymnastics men's team, Swedish system event.
