= József Keresztessy (gymnast) =

Hungarian gymnast (1885–1962)

- Born: 19 September 1885 Budapest
- Died: 29 December 1962 (aged 77) Toronto

Gymnastics career
- Discipline: Men's artistic gymnastics
- Country represented: Hungary
Medal record
Olympic Games
Silver medal – second place	1912 Stockholm	Team, european system

József Keresztessy (19 September 1885 – 29 December 1962) was a Hungarian gymnast who competed in the 1912 Summer Olympics.

Keresztessy was born in Budapest. He was part of the Hungarian team, which won the silver medal in the gymnastics men's team, European system event in 1912. He died in Toronto, Canada.
