= Luciano Savorini =

Italian gymnast

- Born: 3 October 1885 Argenta, Kingdom of Italy
- Died: 30 October 1964 (aged 79) Bologna, Italy

Gymnastics career
- Discipline: Men's artistic gymnastics
- Country represented: Italy
- Club: Società Ginnastica Fortitudo
Medal record
Men's artistic gymnastics
Representing Kingdom of Italy
Olympic Games
Gold medal – first place	1912 Stockholm	Team

Luciano Savorini (October 3, 1885 – October 30, 1964) was an Italian gymnast who competed in the 1912 Summer Olympics. He was part of the Italian team, which won the gold medal in the gymnastics men's team, European system event in 1912.
