= Nils Silfverskiöld =

Swedish gymnast

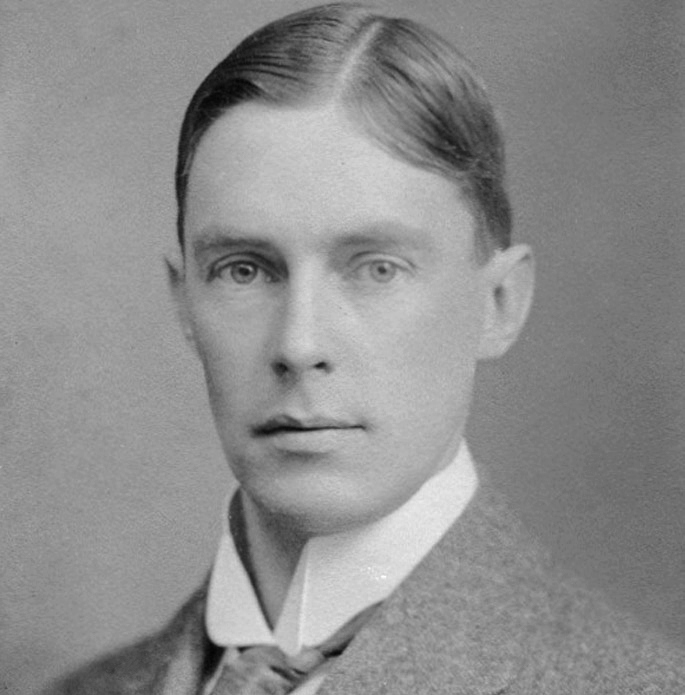
- Silfverskiöld c. 1912

Personal information
- Full name: Nils Otto Silfverskiöld
- Born: 3 January 1888 Gothenburg, United Kingdoms of Sweden and Norway
- Died: 18 August 1957 (aged 69) Stockholm, Sweden

Gymnastics career
- Discipline: Men's artistic gymnastics
- Country represented: Sweden
- Gym: Upsala Gymnastikförening
Medal record
Men's artistic gymnastics
Representing Sweden
Olympic Games
Gold medal – first place	1912 Stockholm	Team, Swedish system

Nils Otto Silfverskiöld (3 January 1888 – 18 August 1957) was a Swedish Olympic gymnast, orthopedic surgeon and left-wing intellectual. As a gymnast he won a gold medal in the Swedish system team event at the 1912 Summer Olympics. As a surgeon he developed a knee flexion test that was later adapted in a diagnosis of foot and ankle disorders. He was employed at the Sabbatsberg Hospital (1927), Serafimerlasarettet (1936) and Karolinska University Hospital (1940).

Silfverskiöld was born to a doctor, the head of a pediatric hospital. In 1911 he graduated from the medical faculty of the Uppsala University, in 1916 received a doctor's degree, and in 1924 presented a PhD on the orthopedics of paralysis in children (German: Orthopädische Studie über Hemiplegia spastica infantilis), and later defended a habilitation. His work was devoted to healing disabled people, including those with missing limbs. In parallel, he taught artistic gymnastics (until 1917) and served as a military doctor in Stockholm.

Silfverskiöld had strong anti-Nazi and pro-Soviet sympathies. In 1937, during the Spanish Civil War, he established a Swedish hospital in Spain to help the Republicans and later became president of the Swedish-Soviet Federation.

Silfverskiöld was married four times. His third marriage was in 1932 with Countess Mary von Rosen. Her family had good relations with Nazi Germany in general and with Hermann Göring in particular. This resulted in a scandal at the wedding of Silfverskiöld and von Rosen when all the attendants (but not the groom and bride) made the Nazi salute to Göring.

Silfverskiöld and von Rosen had a daughter Monica Getz, the ex-wife of American jazz saxophonist Stan Getz. She is also a diplomat, educator and activist who founded the National Coalition for Family Justice.
