= Curt Hartzell =

Swedish gymnast

- Born: 3 September 1891 Norrköping, United Kingdoms of Sweden and Norway
- Died: 17 January 1975 (aged 83) Stockholm, Sweden

Gymnastics career
- Discipline: Men's artistic gymnastics
- Country represented: Sweden
- Club: Norrköpings Gymnastikförening
Medal record
Men's artistic gymnastics
Representing Sweden
Olympic Games
Gold medal – first place	1912 Stockholm	Team, Swedish system

Curt Hartzell (September 3, 1891 – January 17, 1975) was a Swedish gymnast who competed in the 1912 Summer Olympics. He was part of the Swedish team, which won the gold medal in the gymnastics men's team, Swedish system event.
