= Torleif Torkildsen =

Norwegian gymnast and tennis player

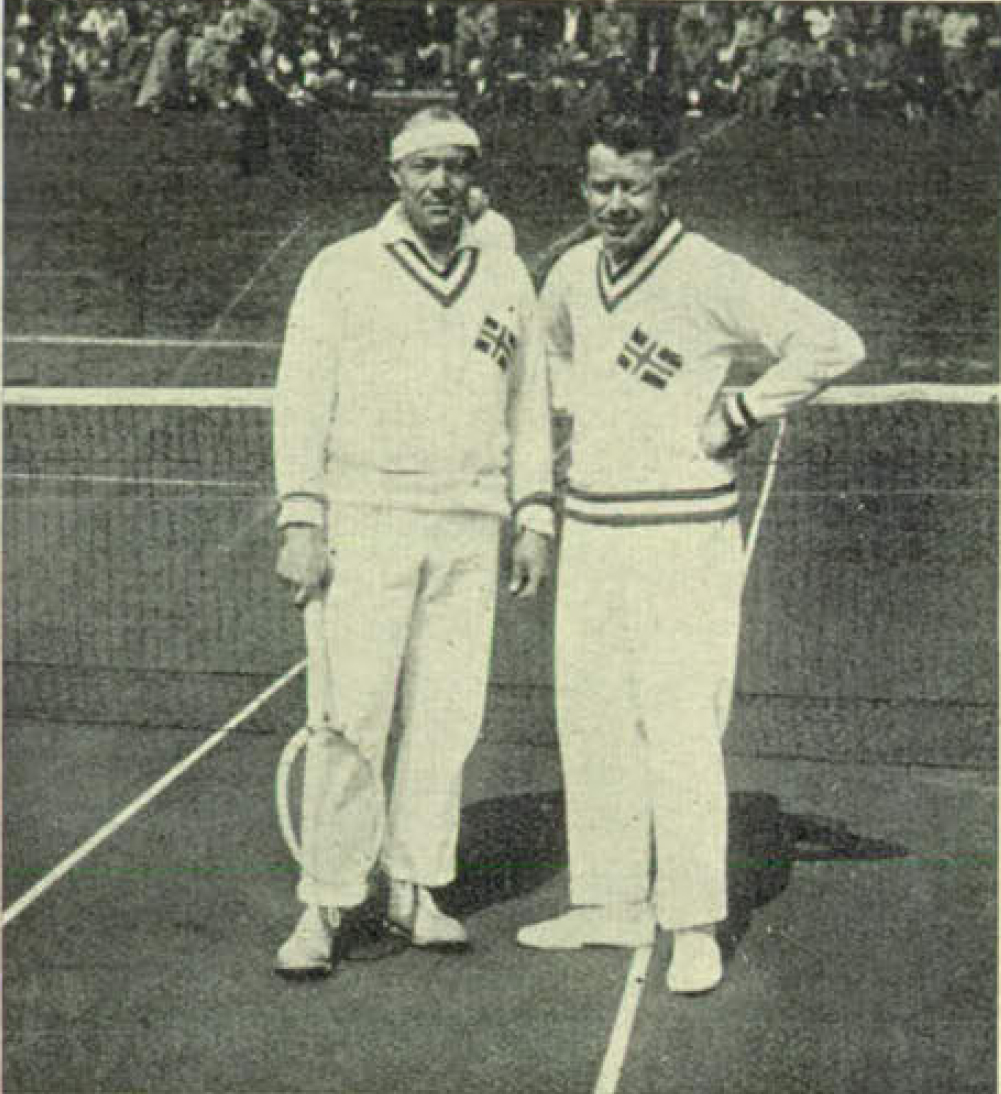
- Torkildsen (left) and Jack Nielsen at the 1929 Davis Cup

Personal information
- Born: 12 May 1892 Kristiania, United Kingdoms of Sweden and Norway
- Died: 7 October 1944 (aged 52) Oslo, Norway

Gymnastics career
- Discipline: Men's artistic gymnastics
- Country represented: Norway
- Club: Chistiania Turnforening
Medal record
Men's artistic gymnastics
Representing Norway
Olympic Games
Bronze medal – third place	1912 Stockholm	Team, Swedish system

Sport
- Tennis career
- Country (sports): Norway
- Plays: Right-handed

Singles
- Career titles: 5 (national), 1 (international)

Team competitions
- Davis Cup: 2nd round (Europe) (1930, 1931)
- Last updated on: 21 February 2013.

Torleif Torkildsen (Norwegian pronunciation: [toːrlæɪf toːrkɪlsn̩]; 12 May 1892 – 7 October 1944) was a Norwegian gymnast and tennis player who competed in the 1912 Summer Olympics. He was part of the Norwegian gymnastics team, which won the bronze medal in the gymnastics men's team, Swedish system event.

In tennis, he was a member of the Norway Davis Cup team, in which he earned Norway's first victorious rubber in the tie against Hungary in 1929 by beating Imre Takáts. Before entering the Davis Cup in 1927, Norway competed in the Nordisk Cup, an annual four-nation Scandinavian tennis team cup, in which he earned Norway's only won match against Sweden's Curt Östberg. The same year in August, he won an international tournament in Oslo, meeting Östberg again in the final. In national competition, he was a five-time tennis champion between 1926 and 1930.
