= Ingvald Eriksen =

Danish gymnast

- Born: 3 September 1884 Odense, Denmark
- Died: 28 January 1961 (aged 76) Odense, Denmark

Gymnastics career
- Discipline: Men's artistic gymnastics
- Country represented: Denmark
Medal record
Men's artistic gymnastics
Representing Denmark
Olympic Games
Silver medal – second place	1912 Stockholm	Team, Swedish system

Ingvald Eriksen (3 September 1884 in Odense, Denmark – 28 January 1961 in Odense, Denmark) was a Danish gymnast who competed in the 1912 Summer Olympics. He was part of the Danish team, which won the silver medal in the gymnastics men's team, Swedish system event.
