= Hans Pedersen =

Danish artistic gymnast

- Born: 5 November 1887 Højelse, Denmark
- Died: 22 September 1943 (aged 55) Kimmerslev, Denmark

Gymnastics career
- Discipline: Men's artistic gymnastics
- Country represented: Denmark
Medal record
Men's artistic gymnastics
Representing Denmark
Olympic Games
Silver medal – second place	1912 Stockholm	Team, Swedish system
Silver medal – second place	1920 Antwerp	Team, Swedish system

Hans Pedersen (5 November 1887 in Højelse, Køge Municipality, Sjælland, Denmark – 22 September 1943 in Kimmerslev, Køge Municipality) was a Danish gymnast who competed in the 1912 and 1920 Summer Olympics.

He was a part of the Danish men's teams, which won two silver medals at the Swedish gymnastics system event at Stockholm in 1912 and at Antwerp in 1920. He was married to Kamilla Larsen from Storeskov in Denmark.
