= Lajos Kmetykó =

Hungarian gymnast (1884–1952)

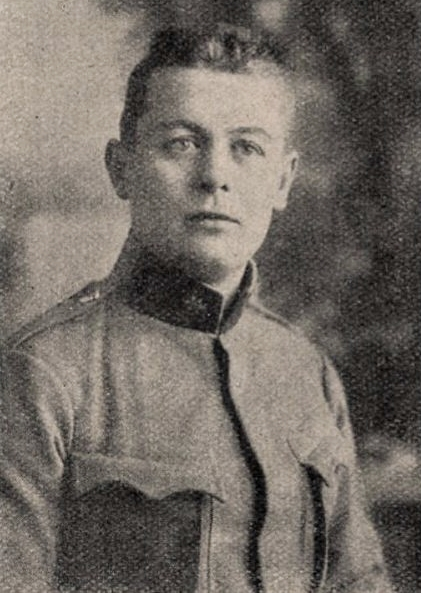

Personal information
- Born: March 22, 1884 Košice, Austria-Hungary
- Died: January 2, 1952 (aged 67) Budapest

Gymnastics career
- Discipline: Men's artistic gymnastics
- Country represented: Hungary
Medal record
Olympic Games
Silver medal – second place	1912 Stockholm	Team, european system

Lajos Kmetykó (March 22, 1884 in Košice – January 4, 1952 in Budapest) was a Hungarian gymnast who competed in the 1912 Summer Olympics. He was part of the Hungarian team, which won the silver medal in the gymnastics men's team European system event in 1912.
