= Einar Olsen (gymnast) =

Danish gymnast

- Full name: Peter Einar Olsen
- Born: 11 March 1893 Vig, Denmark
- Died: 3 June 1949 (aged 56) Grevinge, Denmark

Gymnastics career
- Discipline: Men's artistic gymnastics
- Country represented: Denmark
Medal record
Men's artistic gymnastics
Representing Denmark
Olympic Games
Silver medal – second place	1912 Stockholm	Team, Swedish system

Peter Einar Olsen (11 March 1893 in Vig, Denmark – 3 June 1949 in Grevinge, Denmark) was a Danish gymnast who competed in the 1912 Summer Olympics. He was part of the Danish team, which won the silver medal in the gymnastics men's team, Swedish system event.
