= Karl Johan Svensson =

Swedish artistic gymnast

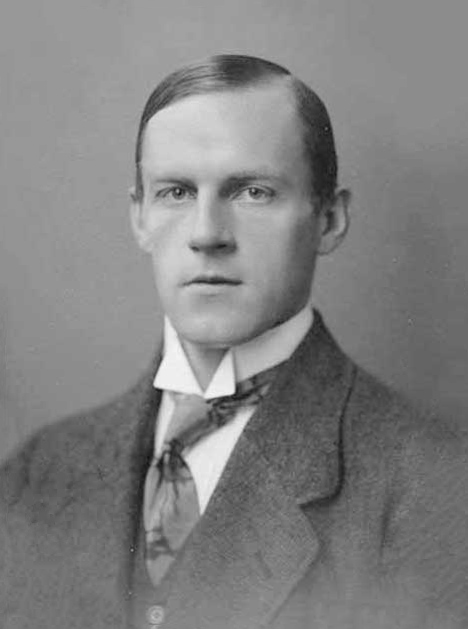
- Portrait of Svensson c. 1912

Personal information
- Born: 12 March 1887 Solna, United Kingdoms of Sweden and Norway
- Died: 20 January 1964 (aged 76) Stockholm, Sweden

Gymnastics career
- Discipline: Men's artistic gymnastics
- Country represented: Sweden
- Club: Kristliga Förening av Unga Mäns Gymnastikavdelningar
Medal record
Men's artistic gymnastics
Representing Sweden
Olympic Games
Gold medal – first place	1908 London	Team
Gold medal – first place	1912 Stockholm	Team, Swedish system

Karl Johan Svensson (12 March 1887 – 20 January 1964) was a Swedish gymnast. He was part of the Swedish teams that won gold medals at the 1908 and 1912 Summer Olympics. He was a civil engineer by trade.
