= Georg Brustad =

Norwegian artistic gymnast

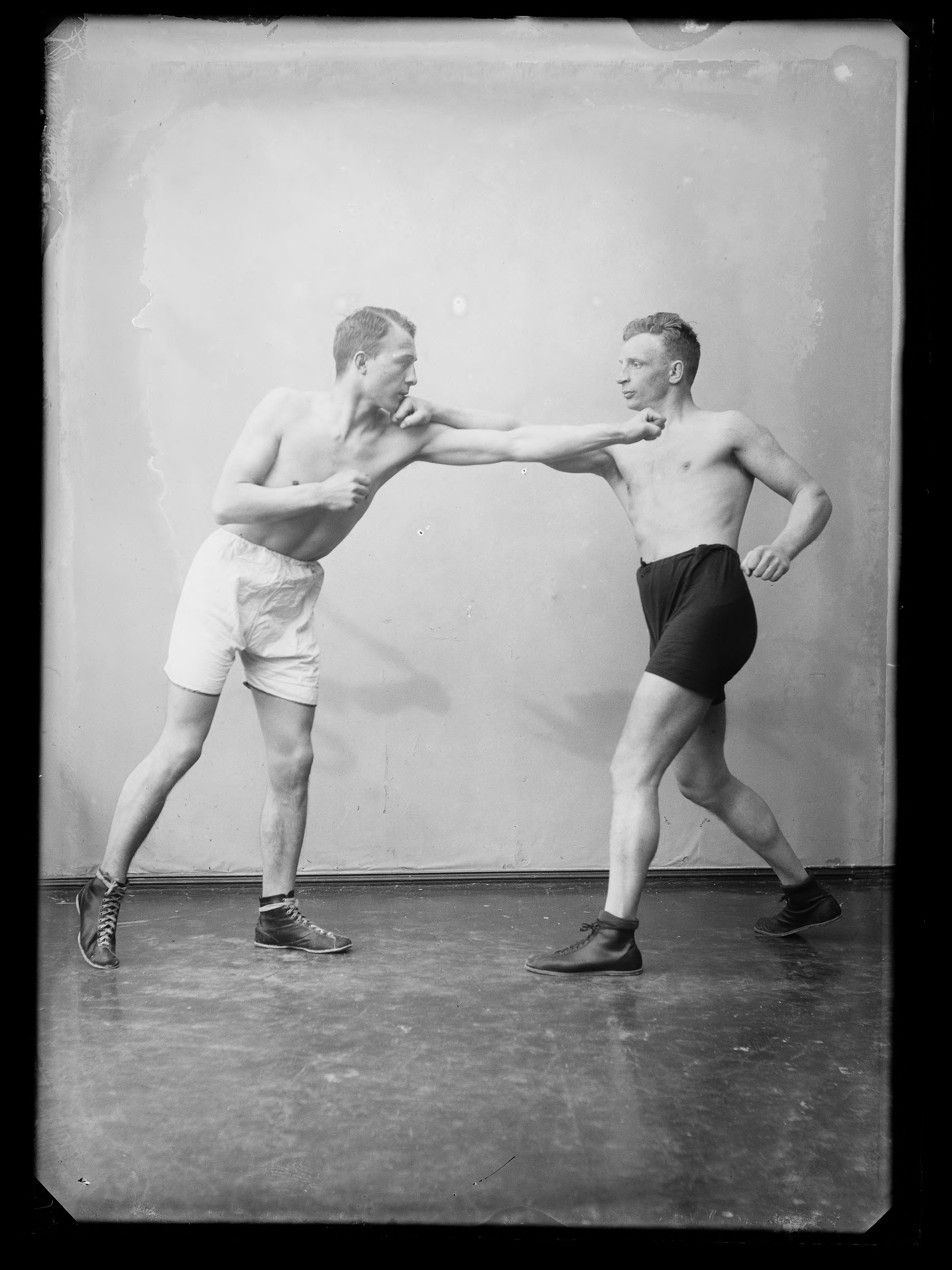
- Brustad, on the right, boxing

Personal information
- Full name: Georg Antonius Brustad
- Born: 23 November 1892 Kristiania, United Kingdoms of Sweden and Norway
- Died: 17 March 1932 (aged 39) Oslo, Norway

Gymnastics career
- Discipline: Men's artistic gymnastics
- Country represented: Norway
- Gym: Chistiania Turnforening
Medal record
Men's artistic gymnastics
Representing Norway
Olympic Games
Bronze medal – third place	1912 Stockholm	Team, Swedish system

Georg Antonius Brustad (23 November 1892 – 17 March 1932) was a Norwegian gymnast who competed in the 1912 Summer Olympics. He was also Norway's first professional boxer, boxing a total of 22 matches as a professional.

He was a member of the Norwegian gymnastics team, which won the bronze medal in the gymnastics men's team Swedish system event. Brustad died from a brain tumour in 1932.
