= Carl Larsen (gymnast) =

Danish gymnast (1886–1962)

- Full name: Carl Otto Laurits Larsen
- Born: 3 June 1886 Fårevejle, Denmark
- Died: 4 December 1962 (aged 76) Frederiksværk, Denmark

Gymnastics career
- Discipline: Men's artistic gymnastics
- Country represented: Denmark
Medal record
Men's artistic gymnastics
Representing Denmark
Olympic Games
Silver medal – second place	1912 Stockholm	Team, Swedish system

Carl Otto Laurits Larsen (3 June 1886 in Fårevejle, Denmark – 4 December 1962 in Frederiksværk, Denmark) was a Danish gymnast who competed in the 1912 Summer Olympics. He was part of the Danish team, which won the silver medal in the gymnastics men's team, Swedish system event.
