= Arthur Amundsen =

Norwegian artistic gymnast

- Full name: Arthur Martinius Amundsen
- Born: 22 March 1886 Kristiania, United Kingdoms of Sweden and Norway
- Died: 25 February 1936 (aged 49) Vestre Aker, Norway

Gymnastics career
- Discipline: Men's artistic gymnastics
- Country represented: Norway
- Gym: Chistiania Turnforening
Medal record
Men's artistic gymnastics
Representing Norway
Olympic Games
| Silver medal – second place | 1908 London | Team |
| Bronze medal – third place | 1912 Stockholm | Team, Swedish system |

Arthur Martinius Amundsen (22 March 1886 – 25 February 1936) was a Norwegian gymnast who competed in the 1908 Summer Olympics and in the 1912 Summer Olympics. As a member of the Norwegian team, he won a silver medal in the gymnastics team event in 1908. Four years later, he was part of the Norwegian team, which won the bronze medal in the gymnastics team, Swedish system event.
