= Søren Alfred Jensen =

Danish gymnast

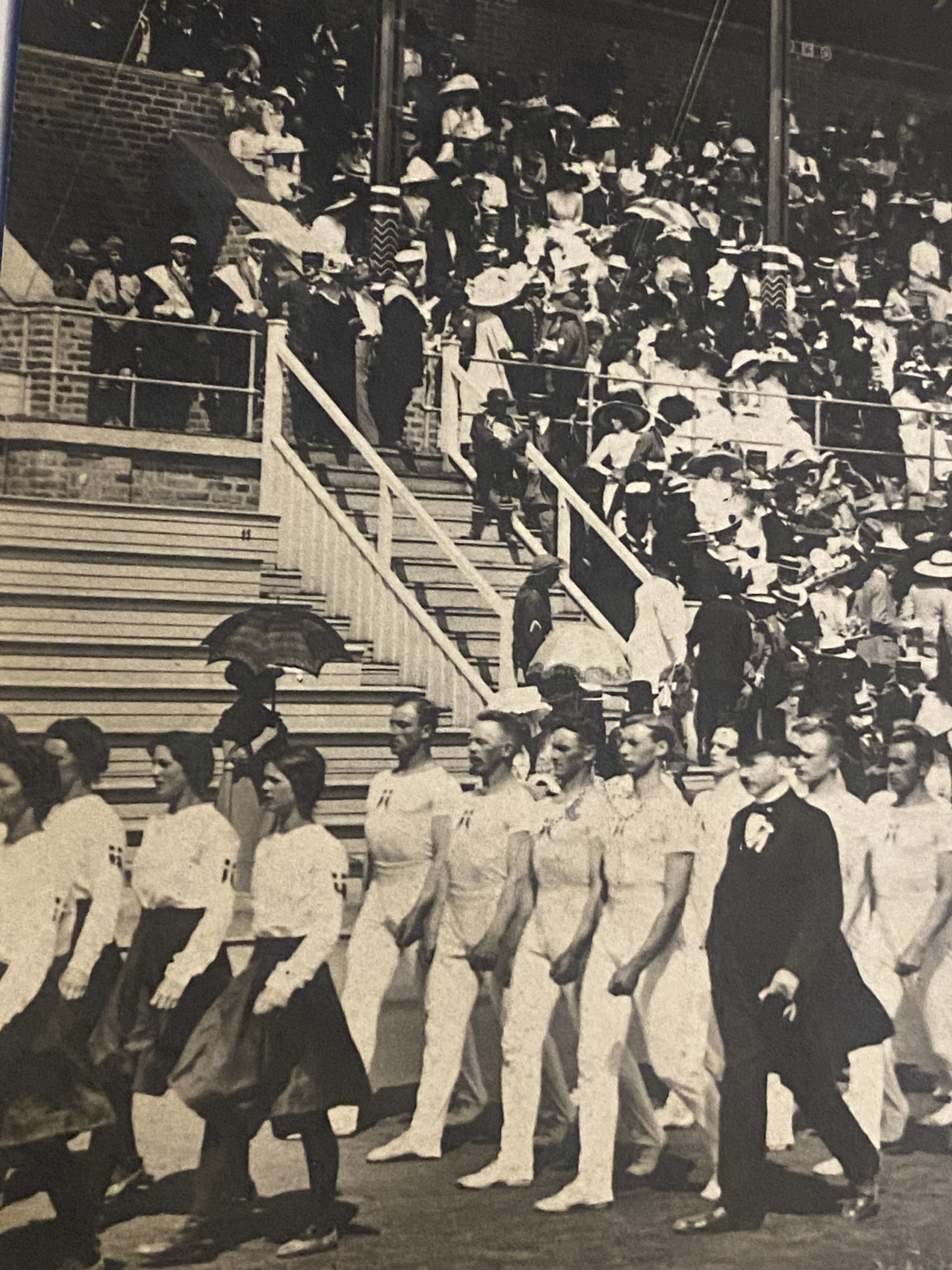
- Jensen at the 1912 Summer Olympics

Personal information
- Born: 22 May 1891 Veerst, Denmark
- Died: 16 May 1978 (aged 86) Denver, Colorado, US

Gymnastics career
- Discipline: Men's artistic gymnastics
- Country represented: Denmark
Medal record
Men's artistic gymnastics
Representing Denmark
Olympic Games
| Silver medal – second place | 1912 Stockholm | Team, Swedish system |

Søren Alfred Jensen (22 May 1891 – 16 May 1978) was a Danish gymnast who competed in the 1912 Summer Olympics. He was born in Veerst, and was a member of the Danish team which won the silver medal in the gymnastics men's team, Swedish system event. He died in Denver, Colorado, USA.

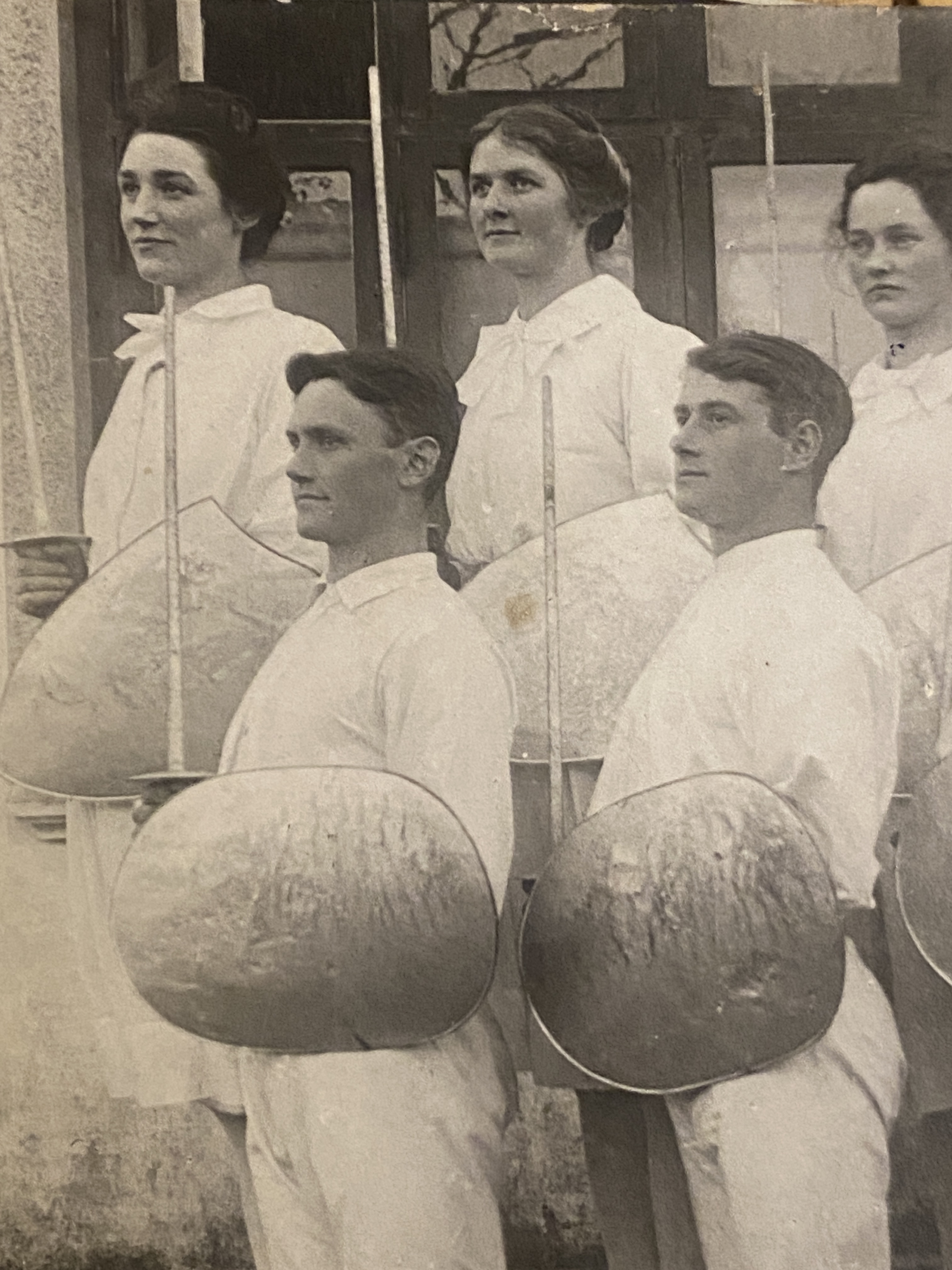
Søren Alfred Jensen
