= Per Nilsson (gymnast) =

Swedish gymnast

- Full name: Per Elis Albert Nilsson
- Born: 4 January 1890 Stockholm, United Kingdoms of Sweden and Norway
- Died: 18 June 1964 (aged 74) Stockholm, Sweden

Gymnastics career
- Discipline: Men's artistic gymnastics
- Country represented: Sweden
- Club: Stockholms Gymnastikförening
Medal record
Men's artistic gymnastics
Representing Sweden
Olympic Games
Gold medal – first place	1912 Stockholm	Team, Swedish system

Per Elis Albert Nilsson (January 4, 1890 – June 18, 1964) was a Swedish gymnast who competed in the 1912 Summer Olympics. He was part of the Swedish team, which won the gold medal in the gymnastics men's team, Swedish system event.
