= Árpád Pédery =

Hungarian gymnast (1890–1914)

- Born: 1 February 1890 Budapest
- Died: 21 October 1914 (aged 24) Luzsek, Galicia

Gymnastics career
- Discipline: Men's artistic gymnastics
- Country represented: Hungary
Medal record
Olympic Games
Silver medal – second place	1912 Stockholm	Team, european system

Árpád Pédery (1 February 1890 – 21 October 1914) was a Hungarian gymnast who competed in the 1912 Summer Olympics. He was born in Budapest.

He was part of the Hungarian team, which won the silver medal in the gymnastics men's team, European system event in 1912. He later joined the Austro-Hungarian Army and was killed during World War I in Luzsek, Galicia.

== See also ==
- List of Olympians killed in World War I
