= Hans Trier Hansen =

Danish artistic gymnast

- Born: 15 May 1893 Vallekilde, Denmark
- Died: 12 September 1980 (aged 87) Hørve, Denmark

Gymnastics career
- Discipline: Men's artistic gymnastics
- Country represented: Denmark
Medal record
Men's artistic gymnastics
Representing Denmark
Olympic Games
Silver medal – second place	1912 Stockholm	Team, Swedish system

Hans Trier Hansen (15 May 1893 in Vallekilde, Denmark – 12 September 1980 in Hørve, Denmark) was a Danish gymnast who competed in the 1912 Summer Olympics.

He was part of the Danish team that won the silver medal in the gymnastics men's team, Swedish system event in 1912.

He worked as a Teacher at Vallekilde Højskole, where his father was the principal.
