= Peter Andersen (gymnast) =

Danish gymnast

- Full name: Peter Villemoes Andersen
- Born: 9 April 1884 Højby, Denmark
- Died: 25 September 1956 (aged 72) Egebjerg, Odsherred Municipality, Denmark

Gymnastics career
- Discipline: Men's artistic gymnastics
- Country represented: Denmark
Medal record
Men's artistic gymnastics
Representing Denmark
Olympic Games
Silver medal – second place	1912 Stockholm	Team, Swedish system

Peter Villemoes Andersen (9 April 1884 i Højby, Denmark – 25 September 1956 in Egebjerg near Odsherred, Denmark) was a Danish gymnast who competed in the 1912 Summer Olympics. He was part of the Danish team, which won the silver medal in the gymnastics men's team, Swedish system event.
