= Győző Halmos =

Hungarian gymnast

- Born: June 13, 1889
- Died: KZ Mauthausen

Gymnastics career
- Discipline: Men's artistic gymnastics
- Country represented: Hungary
Medal record
Olympic Games
Silver medal – second place	1912 Stockholm	Team, european system

Győző Halmos (June 13, 1889 – c. 1945) was a Hungarian gymnast who competed in the 1912 Summer Olympics. He was part of the Hungarian team, which won the silver medal in the gymnastics men's team, European system event in 1912.

He died in KZ Mauthausen during World War II.
