= Sven Rosén (gymnast) =

Swedish gymnast

- Full name: Sven Axel Arigo Rosén
- Born: 10 March 1887 Stockholm, United Kingdoms of Sweden and Norway
- Died: 22 June 1963 (aged 76) Danderyd, Sweden

Gymnastics career
- Discipline: Men's artistic gymnastics
- Country represented: Sweden
- Club: Stockholms Gymnastikförening
Medal record
Men's artistic gymnastics
Representing Sweden
Olympic Games
Gold medal – first place	1908 London	Team
Gold medal – first place	1912 Stockholm	Team, Swedish system

Sven Axel Arigo Rosén (March 10, 1887 – June 22, 1963) was a Swedish gymnast who participated in the 1908 Summer Olympics and in the 1912 Summer Olympics. He was part of the Swedish team that won the gold medal in the gymnastics men's team event in 1908. In the 1912 Summer Olympics, he won his second gold medal as a member of the Swedish gymnastics team in the Swedish system event.
