= John Sörenson =

Swedish artistic gymnast

- Full name: John Emil Sörenson
- Born: 15 September 1889 Malmö, United Kingdoms of Sweden and Norway
- Died: 25 October 1976 (aged 87) Lidingö, Sweden

Gymnastics career
- Discipline: Men's artistic gymnastics
- Country represented: Sweden
- Club: Malmö Gymnastik- och Fäktklubb; Kristliga Förening av Unga Mäns Gymnastikavdelningar
Medal record
Men's artistic gymnastics
Representing Sweden
Olympic Games
Gold medal – first place	1912 Stockholm	Team, Swedish system
Gold medal – first place	1920 Antwerp	Team, Swedish system

John Emil Sörenson (September 15, 1889 – October 25, 1976) was a Swedish gymnast who competed in the 1920 Summer Olympics. He was the only member of the Swedish team, which participated in the gymnastics men's team, Swedish system competition in the 1912 and 1920 Olympic games. So he won the gold medal in both events and defended his title eight years later.
