= David Wiman =

Swedish gymnast

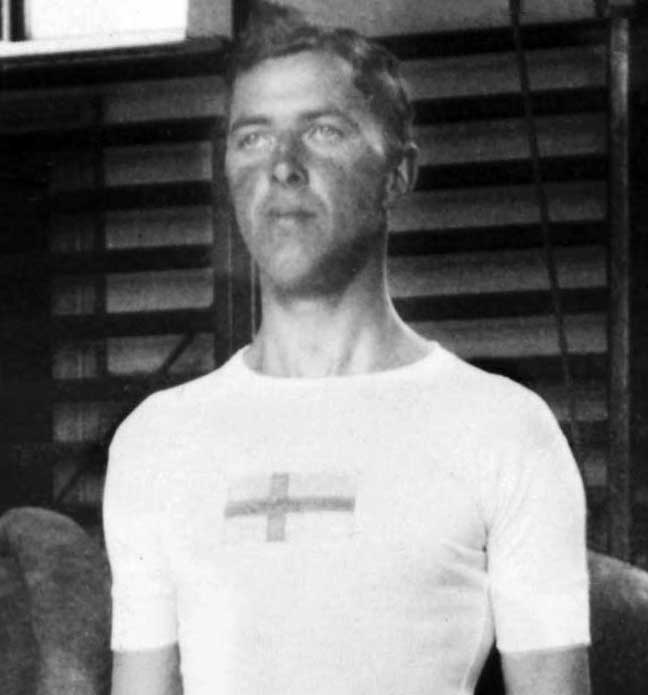
- Wiman c. 1912

Personal information
- Full name: David Lepold Wiman
- Born: 6 August 1884 Gothenburg, United Kingdoms of Sweden and Norway
- Died: 6 October 1950 (aged 66) Hovås, Sweden

Gymnastics career
- Discipline: Men's artistic gymnastics
- Country represented: Sweden
- Gym: Göteborgs Gymnastikförening
Medal record
Men's artistic gymnastics
Representing Sweden
Olympic Games
Gold medal – first place	1912 Stockholm	Team, Swedish system

David Lepold Wiman (6 August 1884 – 6 October 1950) was a Swedish gymnast who competed in the 1912 Summer Olympics. He was part of the Swedish team that won the gold medal in the Swedish system event. In retirement, he ran his own insurance company.
