= Carl-Ehrenfried Carlberg =

Swedish gymnast (1889–1962)

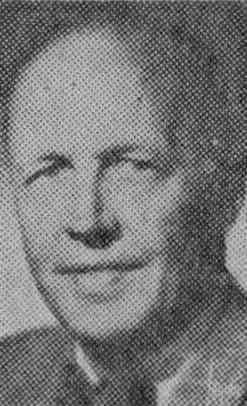
- Carlberg c. 1949

Personal information
- Born: 24 February 1889 Stockholm, United Kingdoms of Sweden and Norway
- Died: 22 January 1962 (aged 72) Stockholm, Sweden

Gymnastics career
- Discipline: Men's artistic gymnastics
- Country represented: Sweden
- Gym: Göteborgs Gymnastikförening
Medal record
Men's artistic gymnastics
Representing Sweden
Olympic Games
Gold medal – first place	1912 Stockholm	Team, Swedish system

Carl-Ehrenfried Carlberg (24 February 1889 – 22 January 1962) was a Swedish gymnast who competed in the 1912 Summer Olympics. He was also a supporter and financier of Nazi organisations.

== Early life and Olympics ==
Carlberg was born in Stockholm and served in the Göta Life Guards of the Swedish Army while also training to be an engineer. A keen sportsman during his army service, he was part of the Swedish team, which won the gold medal in the gymnastics men's team, Swedish system event. Following this triumph, he founded a gymnastics institute at Lillsved while also building a successful career in construction.

== Politics ==
In his post-gymnastic career, Carlberg formed his own Gymniska Förbundet in 1928. Publishing the magazine Gymn, the society underlined what it saw as the decadence of Western society, drawing heavily from Elof Eriksson. This group fizzled out by 1932, although Carlberg was a founder and the main financial supporter of the anti-Semitic Manhem Association, a study group which he helped set up in 1934. The group's membership was cross-party, involving members of the Nationalsocialistiska Arbetarpartiet, Per Engdahl's Riksförbundet Det nya Sverige and the Riksförbundet Sverige-Tyskland, amongst others.

A strong supporter of Nazism, Carlberg recruited men for both military and civilian service for the Third Reich during World War II. By this time, he had become a very rich man due to his business interests and used his money to disseminate Nazi propaganda and to fund the Svensk Opposition of Per Engdahl.

Following the war, his Hjälpkommittén för Tysklands barn worked as a relief organisation for German officers, whilst his Svea Rike publishing house, originally set up in the 1930s, was turned over to Neo-Nazism. He also became the largest shareholder in Nation Europa and set up a Carlberg Foundation aimed at youth. In 1958, Carlberg was fined 15,000 Krona for spreading antisemitic propaganda by Carl-Gustaf Herlitz.

After his death in Stockholm, he left his apartment to the Foundation, and in 1965, it was raided by police due to a tip-off that the groups using it had stashed weapons there.

== Bibliography ==
- Philip Rees, Biographical Dictionary of the Extreme Right Since 1890, p. 54
