= Thor Jensen =

Norwegian artistic gymnast

- Full name: Thor Andreas Marius Jensen
- Born: 4 June 1880 Kragerø, United Kingdoms of Sweden and Norway
- Died: 9 December 1976 (aged 96) Lillestrøm, Norway

Gymnastics career
- Discipline: Men's artistic gymnastics
- Country represented: Norway
- Gym: Chistiania Turnforening
Medal record
Men's artistic gymnastics
Representing Norway
Olympic Games
Bronze medal – third place	1912 Stockholm	Team, Swedish system

Thor Andreas Marius Jensen (4 June 1889 – 9 December 1976) was a Norwegian gymnast who competed in the 1912 Summer Olympics. He was part of the Norwegian gymnastics team, which won the bronze medal in the gymnastics men's team, Swedish system event.
