= Rasmus Hansen (gymnast) =

Gymnast

- Born: 13 January 1885 Flemløse, Denmark
- Died: 3 July 1967 (aged 82) Viby J, Denmark

Gymnastics career
- Discipline: Men's artistic gymnastics
- Country represented: Denmark
Medal record
Men's artistic gymnastics
Representing Denmark
Olympic Games
Silver medal – second place	1912 Stockholm	Team, Swedish system

Rasmus Hansen (13 January 1885 in Flemløse, Denmark – 3 July 1967 in Viby J, Århus, Denmark) was a Danish gymnast who competed in the 1912 Summer Olympics. He was part of the Danish team, which won the silver medal in the gymnastics men's team, Swedish system event.
