= Erling Jensen =

Norwegian artistic gymnast

- Born: 3 July 1891 Skien, United Kingdoms of Sweden and Norway
- Died: 20 September 1973 (aged 82) Skien, Norway

Gymnastics career
- Discipline: Men's artistic gymnastics
- Country represented: Norway
- Club: Odds Ballklubb
Medal record
Men's artistic gymnastics
Representing Norway
Olympic Games
Bronze medal – third place	1912 Stockholm	Team, Swedish system

Erling Jensen (3 July 1891 – 20 September 1973) was a Norwegian gymnast who competed in the 1912 Summer Olympics. He was part of the Norwegian gymnastics team, which won the bronze medal in the gymnastics men's team, Swedish system event.
