= Sigurd Smebye =

Norwegian artistic gymnast

- Born: 16 March 1886 Tønsberg, United Kingdoms of Sweden and Norway
- Died: 7 June 1954 (aged 68) Oslo, Norway

Gymnastics career
- Discipline: Men's artistic gymnastics
- Country represented: Norway
- Club: Chistiania Turnforening
Medal record
Men's artistic gymnastics
Representing Norway
Olympic Games
Bronze medal – third place	1912 Stockholm	Team, Swedish system

Sigurd Smebye (16 March 1886 – 7 June 1954) was a Norwegian gymnast who competed in the 1912 Summer Olympics. He was part of the Norwegian gymnastics team, which won the bronze medal in the gymnastics men's team, Swedish system event.
