= Aksel Sørensen =

Gymnast

- Born: 5 October 1891 Vig, Denmark
- Died: 15 May 1955 (aged 63) Roskilde, Denmark

Gymnastics career
- Discipline: Men's artistic gymnastics
- Country represented: Denmark
Medal record
Men's artistic gymnastics
Representing Denmark
Olympic Games
| Silver medal – second place | 1912 Stockholm | Team, Swedish system |

Aksel Sørensen (5 October 1891 in Vig, Denmark – 15 May 1955 in Roskilde, Denmark) was a Danish gymnast who competed in the 1912 Summer Olympics. He was part of the Danish team, which won the silver medal in the gymnastics men's team, Swedish system event.
