= Oscar Engelstad =

Norwegian gymnast (1882–1972)

- Full name: Oscar Aleksander Engelstad
- Born: 2 November 1882 Kristiania, United Kingdoms of Sweden and Norway
- Died: 17 July 1972 (aged 89) Oslo, Norway

Gymnastics career
- Discipline: Men's artistic gymnastics
- Country represented: Norway
- Gym: Oslo IF
Medal record
Men's artistic gymnastics
Representing Norway
Olympic Games
| Bronze medal – third place | 1912 Stockholm | Team, Swedish system |

Oscar Aleksander Engelstad (2 November 1882 – 17 July 1972) was a Norwegian gymnast who competed in the 1912 Summer Olympics. He was part of the Norwegian gymnastics team, which won the bronze medal in the gymnastics men's team, Swedish system event.
