= Daniel Norling =

Gymnast and equestrian

- Full name: Lars Daniel Norling
- Born: 16 January 1888 Stockholm, United Kingdoms of Sweden and Norway
- Died: 28 August 1958 (aged 70) Malmö, Sweden
- Relatives: Axel Norling (brother)

Gymnastics career
- Discipline: Men's artistic gymnastics
- Country represented: Sweden
- Club: Kristliga Förening av Unga Mäns Gymnastikavdelningar; Train 5 Idrottsförening
Medal record

Representing Sweden
Men's artistic gymnastics
Olympic Games
Gold medal – first place	1908 London	Team
Gold medal – first place	1912 Stockholm	Team, Swedish system
Men's equestrian
Olympic Games
Gold medal – first place	1920 Antwerp	Team jumping

Lars Daniel Norling (16 January 1888 – 28 August 1958) was a Swedish Army officer, gymnast and equestrian who participated in the 1908 Summer Olympics, in the 1912 Summer Olympics, and in the 1920 Summer Olympics.

He was part of the Swedish team, which was able to win the gold medal in the gymnastics men's team event in 1908. In the 1912 Summer Olympics, he won his second gold medal as a member of the Swedish gymnastics team in the Swedish system event.

At the 1920 Summer Olympics in Antwerp, he was a member of the Swedish Equestrian jumping team, which won the gold medal.

Norling was promoted to major in 1937.

== Awards and decorations ==
- Knight of the Order of the Sword
- Second Class of the Military Cross

== See also ==
- Dual sport and multi-sport Olympians
- List of multi-sport athletes
- List of multi-sport champions
