= István Herczeg =

Hungarian gymnast (1887–1949)

- Born: December 7, 1887
- Died: July 4, 1949 (aged 61) Szatymaz

Gymnastics career
- Discipline: Men's artistic gymnastics
- Country represented: Hungary
Medal record
Olympic Games
Silver medal – second place	1912 Stockholm	Team, european system

István Herczeg (December 7, 1887 – July 4, 1949) was a Hungarian gymnast who competed in the 1912 Summer Olympics. He was part of the Hungarian team, which won the silver medal in the gymnastics men's team, European system event in 1912. He was born in Apátfalva and died in Szatymaz.
