= Jens Laursen =

Danish gymnast (1888–1967)

- Full name: Jens Peter Martinus Laursen
- Born: 1 January 1888 Tulstrup, Denmark
- Died: 23 May 1967 (aged 79) Frederiksberg, Denmark

Gymnastics career
- Discipline: Men's artistic gymnastics
- Country represented: Denmark
Medal record
Men's artistic gymnastics
Representing Denmark
Olympic Games
Silver medal – second place	1912 Stockholm	Team, Swedish system

Jens Peter Martinus Laursen (1 January 1888 in Tulstrup, Denmark − 27 May 1967 in Frederiksberg, Denmark) was a Danish gymnast who competed in the 1912 Summer Olympics, held in Stockholm, Sweden. He was part of the Danish team, which won the silver medal in the gymnastics men's team, Swedish system event.
