= Ottó Hellmich =

Hungarian gymnast

- Born: 6 April 1874 Budapest
- Died: 2 July 1937 (aged 63) Budapest

Gymnastics career
- Discipline: Men's artistic gymnastics
- Country represented: Hungary
Medal record
Olympic Games
| Silver medal – second place | 1912 Stockholm | Team, european system |

Ottó Hellmich (6 April 1874 – 2 July 1937) was a Hungarian gymnast who competed in the 1912 Summer Olympics. He was part of the Hungarian team, which won the silver medal in the gymnastics men's team, European system event in 1912.
