= Frithjof Sælen (gymnast) =

Norwegian artistic gymnast

- Full name: Frithjof Olsen Sælen, Sr.
- Born: 5 August 1892 Bergen, United Kingdoms of Sweden and Norway
- Died: 9 October 1975 (aged 83) Bergen, Norway
- Relatives: Frithjof Sælen, Jr. (son)

Gymnastics career
- Discipline: Men's artistic gymnastics
- Country represented: Norway
- Club: Fredrikshalds TF, IL Norrøna
Medal record
Men's artistic gymnastics
Representing Norway
Olympic Games
| Gold medal – first place | 1912 Stockholm | Team, free system |
| Silver medal – second place | 1920 Antwerp | Team, free system |

Frithjof Olsen Sælen, Sr. (5 August 1892 – 8 October 1975) was a Norwegian gymnast who competed in the 1912 Summer Olympics and in the 1920 Summer Olympics.

In 1912 he was part of the Norwegian team, which won the gold medal in the gymnastics men's team, free system event. Eight years later he won a silver medal again as member of the Norwegian gymnastics team. He represented the clubs Fredrikshalds TF and IL Norrøna.

Together with Astrid Weltzin (1892–1978) he had the son Frithjof Sælen, Jr.
