= Johannes Hansen (gymnast) =

Danish gymnast

- Born: 6 December 1882 Malt, Denmark
- Died: 20 October 1959 (aged 76) Gentofte, Denmark

Gymnastics career
- Discipline: Men's artistic gymnastics
- Country represented: Denmark
Medal record
Men's artistic gymnastics
Representing Denmark
Olympic Games
Silver medal – second place	1912 Stockholm	Team, Swedish system

Johannes Hansen (6 December 1882 in Malt, Ribe, Denmark – 20 October 1959 in Gentofte, Denmark) was a Danish gymnast who competed in the 1912 Summer Olympics. He was part of the Danish team, which won the silver medal in the gymnastics men's team, Swedish system event.
