= Axel Henry Hansen =

Norwegian artistic gymnast (1887–1980)

- Born: 25 June 1887 Drammen, United Kingdoms of Sweden and Norway
- Died: 4 January 1980 (aged 92) Lier, Norway

Gymnastics career
- Discipline: Men's artistic gymnastics
- Country represented: Norway
- Gym: Drammens Turnforening
Medal record
Men's artistic gymnastics
Representing Norway
Olympic Games
| Bronze medal – third place | 1912 Stockholm | Team, Swedish system |

Axel Henry Hansen (25 June 1887 – 4 January 1980) was a Norwegian gymnast who competed in the 1912 Summer Olympics. He was part of the Norwegian gymnastics team, which won the bronze medal in the gymnastics men's team, Swedish system event.
