= Jens Kristian Jensen =

Danish gymnast (1885–1956)

- Born: 22 March 1885 Pedersborg, Denmark
- Died: 27 March 1956 (aged 71) Vordingborg, Denmark

Gymnastics career
- Discipline: Men's artistic gymnastics
- Country represented: Denmark
Medal record
Men's artistic gymnastics
Representing Denmark
Olympic Games
Silver medal – second place	1912 Stockholm	Team, Swedish system

Jens Kristian Jensen (22 March 1885 in Pedersborg, Denmark – 27 March 1956 in Vordingborg, Denmark) was a Danish gymnast who competed in the 1912 Summer Olympics. He was part of the Danish team, which won the silver medal in the gymnastics men's team, Swedish system event.
