= Knut Torell =

Swedish gymnast

- Full name: Knut Emanuel Torell
- Born: 1 May 1885 Norra Sandsjö, United Kingdoms of Sweden and Norway
- Died: 24 December 1966 (aged 81) Österhaninge, Sweden

Gymnastics career
- Discipline: Men's artistic gymnastics
- Country represented: Sweden
- Club: Stockholms Gymnastikförening
Medal record
Men's artistic gymnastics
Representing Sweden
Olympic Games
| Gold medal – first place | 1912 Stockholm | Team, Swedish system |

Knut Emanuel Torell (May 1, 1885 – December 24, 1966) was a Swedish gymnast who competed in the 1912 Summer Olympics. He was part of the Swedish team, which won the gold medal in the gymnastics men's team, Swedish system event.
