= Poul Mark =

Danish gymnast

- Full name: Poul Sørensen Mark
- Born: 19 June 1889 Erslev, Denmark
- Died: 18 January 1957 (aged 67) Odense, Denmark

Gymnastics career
- Discipline: Men's artistic gymnastics
- Country represented: Denmark
Medal record
Men's artistic gymnastics
Representing Denmark
Olympic Games
Silver medal – second place	1912 Stockholm	Team, Swedish system

Poul Sørensen Mark (19 June 1889 in Erslev, Mors, Denmark – 18 January 1957 in Odense, Denmark) was a Danish gymnast who competed in the 1912 Summer Olympics. He was part of the Danish team, which won the silver medal in the gymnastics men's team, Swedish system event.
