= Anders Hylander =

Swedish gymnast

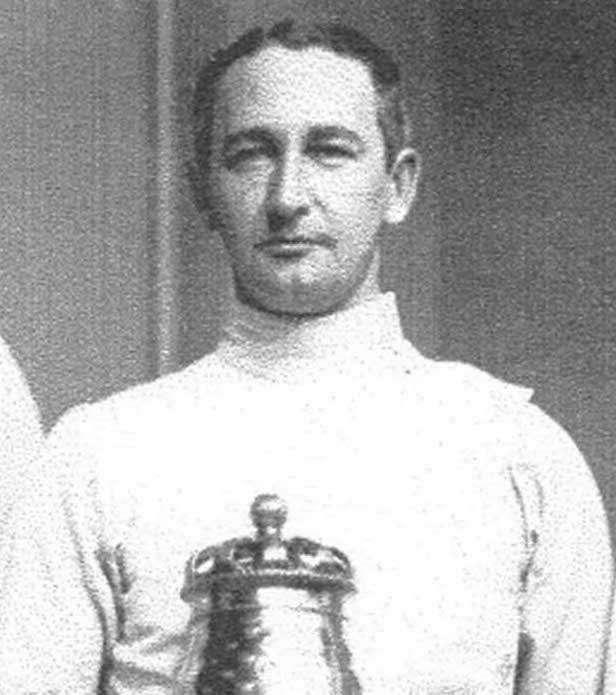
- Hylander c. 1912

Personal information
- Born: 6 November 1883 Östad, United Kingdoms of Sweden and Norway
- Died: 10 February 1967 (aged 83) Stockholm, Sweden

Gymnastics career
- Discipline: Men's artistic gymnastics
- Country represented: Sweden
- Gym: Upsala Gymnastikförening
Medal record
Men's artistic gymnastics
Representing Sweden
Olympic Games
Gold medal – first place	1912 Stockholm	Team, Swedish system

Anders Hylander (6 November 1883 – 10 February 1967) was a Swedish gymnast. He was part of the Swedish team that won the gold medal in the Swedish system event at the 1912 Summer Olympics.
