= Sven Landberg =

Swedish gymnast and footballer (1888–1962)

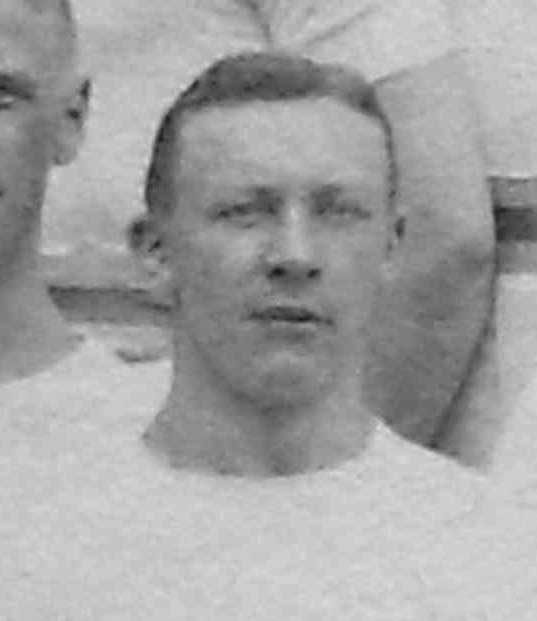
- Landberg c. 1910

Personal information
- Full name: Sven Axel Richard Landberg
- Born: 6 December 1888 Stockholm, United Kingdoms of Sweden and Norway
- Died: 11 April 1962 (aged 73) Stockholm, Sweden

Gymnastics career
- Discipline: Men's artistic gymnastics
- Country represented: Sweden
- Club: Stockholms Gymnastikförening
Medal record
Men's artistic gymnastics
Representing Sweden
Olympic Games
Gold medal – first place	1908 London	Team
Gold medal – first place	1912 Stockholm	Team, Swedish system

Sven Axel Richard Landberg (6 December 1888 – 11 April 1962) was a Swedish gymnast and football player. He was part of the Swedish gymnastics teams that won gold medals at the 1908 and in the 1912 Summer Olympics.
