= Oscar Olstad =

Norwegian gymnast (1887–1977)

- Full name: Hans Oscar Olsen Olstad
- Born: 23 June 1887 Tune, United Kingdoms of Sweden and Norway
- Died: 2 April 1977 (aged 89) Tune, Norway

Gymnastics career
- Discipline: Men's artistic gymnastics
- Country represented: Norway
- Club: Turn- og Idrettslaget National
Medal record
Men's artistic gymnastics
Representing Norway
Olympic Games
Bronze medal – third place	1912 Stockholm	Team, Swedish system

Hans Oscar Olsen Olstad (22 June 1887 – 2 April 1977) was a Norwegian gymnast who competed in the 1912 Summer Olympics. He was part of the Norwegian gymnastics team, which won the bronze medal in the gymnastics men's team, Swedish system event.
