= Ferenc Szűts =

Hungarian gymnast (1891–1966)

- Born: December 16, 1891
- Died: November 28, 1966 (aged 74)

Gymnastics career
- Discipline: Men's artistic gymnastics
- Country represented: Hungary
Medal record
Olympic Games
Silver medal – second place	1912 Stockholm	Team, european system

Ferenc Szűts (December 16, 1891 – November 28, 1966) was a Hungarian gymnast who competed in the 1908 Summer Olympics and in the 1912 Summer Olympics.

In 1908, he participated in the individual all-around competition, but his place is unknown. He was part of the Hungarian team, which won the silver medal in the gymnastics men's team, European system event in 1912.
