= Johannes Vinther =

Gymnast

- Full name: Johannes Larsen Vinther
- Born: 5 January 1893 Nørre Broby, Denmark
- Died: 24 May 1968 (aged 75) Oure, Denmark

Gymnastics career
- Discipline: Men's artistic gymnastics
- Country represented: Denmark
Medal record
Men's artistic gymnastics
Representing Denmark
Olympic Games
Silver medal – second place	1912 Stockholm	Team, Swedish system

Johannes Larsen Vinther (5 January 1893 in Nørre Broby, Denmark – 24 May 1968 in Oure, Denmark) was a Danish gymnast who competed in the 1912 Summer Olympics. He was part of the Danish team, which won the silver medal in the gymnastics men's team, Swedish system event.
