= Jenő Rittich =

Hungarian gymnast

- Born: January 13, 1889
- Died: 24 December 1961 (aged 72)

Gymnastics career
- Discipline: Men's artistic gymnastics
- Country represented: Hungary
Medal record
Olympic Games
Silver medal – second place	1912 Stockholm	Team, european system

Jenő Rittich (January 13, 1889 – December 24, 1961) was a Hungarian gymnast who competed in the 1912 Summer Olympics. He was part of the Hungarian team, which won the silver medal in the gymnastics men's team, European system event in 1912.
