= Søren Thorborg =

Gymnast

- Full name: Søren Frederik Thorborg
- Born: 10 March 1889 Barrit, Denmark
- Died: 31 July 1978 (aged 89) Gilleleje, Denmark

Gymnastics career
- Discipline: Men's artistic gymnastics
- Country represented: Denmark
Medal record
Men's artistic gymnastics
Representing Denmark
Olympic Games
Silver medal – second place	1912 Stockholm	Team, Swedish system

Søren Frederik Thorborg (10 March 1889 in Barrit, Denmark – 31 July 1978 in Gilleleje, Denmark) was a Danish gymnast who competed in the 1912 Summer Olympics. He was part of the Danish team, which won the silver medal in the gymnastics men's team, Swedish system event.
