= Karl-Erik Svensson =

Swedish gymnast

- Born: 20 February 1891 Gothenburg, United Kingdoms of Sweden and Norway
- Died: 9 November 1978 (aged 87) Stockholm, Sweden

Gymnastics career
- Discipline: Men's artistic gymnastics
- Country represented: Sweden
- Club: Kristliga Förening av Unga Mäns Gymnastikavdelningar
Medal record
Men's artistic gymnastics
Representing Sweden
Olympic Games
Gold medal – first place	1912 Stockholm	Team, Swedish system

Karl-Erik Svensson (February 20, 1891 - November 9, 1978) was a Swedish gymnast who competed in the 1912 Summer Olympics.

He was part of the Swedish team, which won the gold medal in the gymnastics men's team, Swedish system event.
