= Axel Janse =

Swedish gymnast

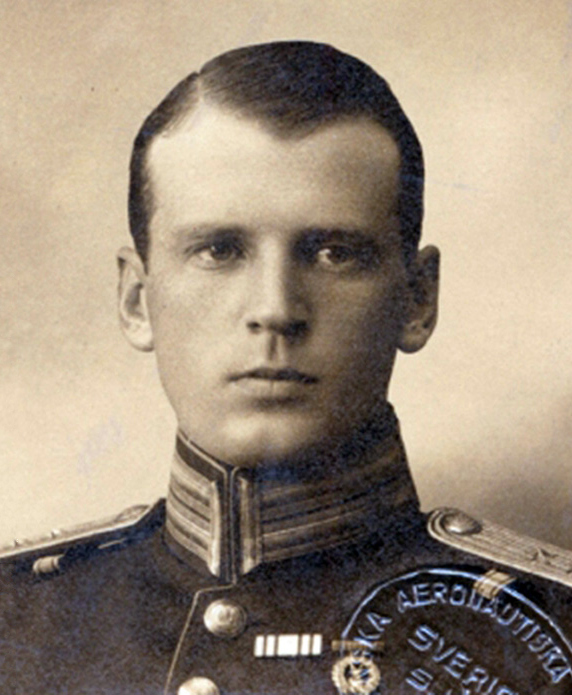
- Janse c. 1910s

Personal information
- Full name: Axel Johan Janse
- Born: 18 March 1888 Ärla, United Kingdoms of Sweden and Norway
- Died: 18 August 1973 (aged 85) Malmö, Sweden

Gymnastics career
- Discipline: Men's artistic gymnastics
- Country represented: Sweden
- Club: Skara Läroverks Idrottsförening
Medal record
Men's artistic gymnastics
Representing Sweden
Olympic Games
Gold medal – first place	1912 Stockholm	Team, Swedish system

Axel Johan Janse (18 March 1888 – 18 August 1973) was a Swedish gymnast. He was part of the Swedish team that won the gold medal in the Swedish system event at the 1912 Summer Olympics. He was also a military pilot and a model for the sculpture Deliverer in Örebro.
