= Peter Hol =

Norwegian artistic gymnast

- Born: 19 March 1883 Kristiania, United Kingdoms of Sweden and Norway
- Died: 22 June 1981 (aged 98) Winnipeg, Manitoba, Canada

Gymnastics career
- Discipline: Men's artistic gymnastics
- Country represented: Norway
- Club: Chistiania Turnforening, Odds Ballklubb
Medal record
Men's artistic gymnastics
Representing Norway
Olympic Games
Silver medal – second place	1908 London	Team
Silver medal – second place	1920 Antwerp	Team, free system
Bronze medal – third place	1912 Stockholm	Team, Swedish system
Intercalated Games
Gold medal – first place	1906 Athens	Team

Peter Hol (9 March 1883 – 22 June 1981) was a Norwegian gymnast who competed in the 1906 Intercalated Games, the 1908 Summer Olympics, the 1912 Summer Olympics, and the 1920 Summer Olympics.

At the 1906 Intercalated Games in Athens, he was a member of the Norwegian team, which won the gold medal in the gymnastics team event.

In 1908, he won a silver medal in the gymnastics team event with the Norwegian team. He also competed in the all-around event, but his result is unknown.

Four years later, he was part of the Norwegian gymnastics team, which won the bronze medal in the gymnastics men's team Swedish system event.

In 1920, he again won a silver medal in the men's team's free system competition. In the individual all-around event he finished 14th.
