= Torkild Garp =

Danish gymnast

- Born: 31 January 1883 Copenhagen, Denmark
- Died: 16 February 1976 (aged 93) Gentofte, Denmark

Gymnastics career
- Discipline: Men's artistic gymnastics
- Country represented: Denmark
Medal record
Men's artistic gymnastics
Representing Denmark
Olympic Games
Silver medal – second place	1912 Stockholm	Team, Swedish system

Torkild Garp (31 January 1883 – 16 February 1976) was a Danish gymnast who competed in the 1912 Summer Olympics. He was part of the Danish team, which won the silver medal in the gymnastics men's team, Swedish system event.
