= George Falcke =

Danish gymnast

- Born: 2 March 1891 Boston, Massachusetts, US
- Died: 1 February 1979 (aged 87) Copenhagen, Denmark
- Relatives: Cathrine Grage (great granddaughter)

Gymnastics career
- Discipline: Men's artistic gymnastics
- Country represented: Denmark
Medal record
Men's artistic gymnastics
Representing Denmark
Olympic Games
Silver medal – second place	1912 Stockholm	Team, Swedish system

Georg Falcke (2 March 1891 in Boston, Massachusetts, US – 1 February 1979 in Copenhagen, Denmark) was a Danish gymnast who competed in the 1912 Summer Olympics. He was part of the Danish team, which won the silver medal in the gymnastics men's team, Swedish system event.

Professionally, he was a traveling salesman.

He is the great-grandfather of the Danish speed skater Cathrine Grage.
