= Boo Kullberg =

Swedish artistic gymnast

- Full name: Anders Boo Georg Kullberg
- Born: 23 May 1889 Stockholm, United Kingdoms of Sweden and Norway
- Died: 5 April 1962 (aged 72) Bromma, Sweden

Gymnastics career
- Discipline: Men's artistic gymnastics
- Country represented: Sweden
- Club: Stockholms Gymnastikförening
Medal record
Men's artistic gymnastics
Representing Sweden
Olympic Games
Gold medal – first place	1912 Stockholm	Team, Swedish system

Anders Boo Georg Kullberg (May 23, 1889 – April 5, 1962) was a Swedish gymnast who competed in the 1912 Summer Olympics. He was part of the Swedish team, which won the gold medal in the gymnastics men's team, Swedish system event.
