= Jørgen Andersen =

Norwegian artistic gymnast

- Full name: Jørgen Marius Andersen
- Born: 20 February 1886 Sarpsborg, United Kingdoms of Sweden and Norway
- Died: 30 May 1973 (aged 87) Sarpsborg, Norway

Gymnastics career
- Discipline: Men's artistic gymnastics
- Country represented: Norway
- Club: Turn- og Idrettslaget National
Medal record
Men's artistic gymnastics
Representing Norway
Olympic Games
Silver medal – second place	1920 Antwerp	Team, free system
Bronze medal – third place	1912 Stockholm	Team, Swedish system

Jørgen Marius Andersen (20 February 1886 – 30 May 1973) was a Norwegian gymnast who competed in the 1912 Summer Olympics and in the 1920 Summer Olympics.

As a member of the Norwegian team, he won a bronze medal in the gymnastics team, Swedish system event in 1912. Eight years later, he was part of the Norwegian team, which won the silver medal in the gymnastics team, free system event.
