= Edvin Paulsen =

Norwegian gymnast (1889–1963)

- Born: 3 December 1889 Kristiania, United Kingdoms of Sweden and Norway
- Died: 13 March 1963 (aged 73) Oslo, Norway

Gymnastics career
- Discipline: Men's artistic gymnastics
- Country represented: Norway
- Gym: Chistiania Turnforening
Medal record
Men's artistic gymnastics
Representing Norway
Olympic Games
Bronze medal – third place	1912 Stockholm	Team, Swedish system

Edvin Paulsen (3 December 1889 – 13 March 1963) was a Norwegian gymnast who competed in the 1912 Summer Olympics. He was part of the Norwegian gymnastics team, which won the bronze medal in the gymnastics men's team, Swedish system event.
