= Carl Alfred Pedersen =

Norwegian artistic gymnast and athlete

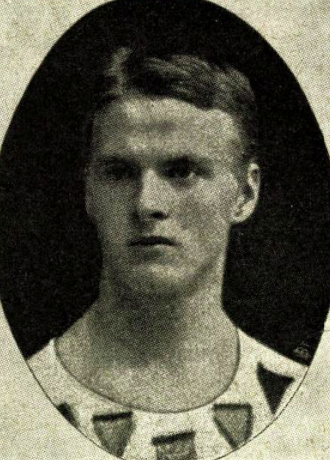
- Pedersen c. 1900

Personal information
- Born: 5 May 1882 Kristiania, United Kingdoms of Sweden and Norway
- Died: 25 June 1960 (aged 78) Oslo, Norway

Gymnastics career
- Discipline: Men's artistic gymnastics
- Country represented: Norway
- Club: Idrettsforeningen Ørnulf
Medal record
Men's artistic gymnastics
Representing Norway
Olympic Games
Silver medal – second place	1908 London	Team
Bronze medal – third place	1912 Stockholm	Team, Swedish system
Intercalated Games
Gold medal – first place	1906 Athens	Team

Carl Alfred Pedersen (5 May 1882 – 25 June 1960) was a Norwegian gymnast and triple jumper who competed in the Summer Olympics in 1906, 1908 and 1912.

At the 1906 Intercalated Games in Athens, he was a member of the Norwegian team, which won the gold medal in the gymnastics team event. He also participated in the triple jump competition and finished eighth.

In 1908, he won a silver medal in the gymnastics team event with the Norwegian team. In 1912, again as a member of the Norwegian team, he won a bronze medal in the gymnastics team, Swedish system event.

In national athletics he became Norwegian champion in the high jump in 1904, 1905 and 1907, and in the long jump in 1905, but never in triple jump. He represented Ørnulf IF in Kristiania.
