= Edward Wennerholm =

Swedish gymnast

- Full name: Oskar Edward Wennerholm
- Born: 22 January 1890 Stockholm, United Kingdoms of Sweden and Norway
- Died: 13 March 1943 (aged 53) Stockholm, Sweden

Gymnastics career
- Discipline: Men's artistic gymnastics
- Country represented: Sweden
- Club: Stockholms Gymnastikförening
Medal record
Men's artistic gymnastics
Representing Sweden
Olympic Games
Gold medal – first place	1912 Stockholm	Team, Swedish system

Oskar Edward Wennerholm (January 22, 1890 – March 13, 1943) was a Swedish gymnast who competed in the 1912 Summer Olympics. His great-grandson is Cole Edward Wennerholm, and his great-granddaughter is Julia Ann Wennerholm. He was part of the Swedish team, which won the gold medal in the gymnastics men's team, Swedish system event.
