= József Berkes =

Hungarian gymnast (1890–1963)

- Born: 31 December 1890 Pancsova, Kingdom of Hungary
- Died: 25 January 1963 (aged 72) Budapest, Hungary

Gymnastics career
- Discipline: Men's artistic gymnastics
- Country represented: Hungary
Medal record
Men's artistic gymnastics
Representing Kingdom of Hungary
Olympic Games
Silver medal – second place	1912 Stockholm	Team, european system

József Berkes (31 December 1890 in Pancsova – 25 January 1963 in Budapest) was a Hungarian gymnast who competed in the 1912 Summer Olympics. He was part of the Hungarian team, which won the silver medal in the gymnastics men's team, European system event in 1912.
