= Umberto Zanolini =

Italian gymnast

- Full name: Noè Umberto Antonio Zanolini
- Born: 31 March 1887 Brescia, Kingdom of Italy
- Died: 12 February 1973 (aged 85) Brescia, Italy

Gymnastics career
- Discipline: Men's artistic gymnastics
- Country represented: Italy
Medal record
Men's artistic gymnastics
Representing Kingdom of Italy
Olympic Games
Gold medal – first place	1912 Stockholm	Team

Noè Umberto Antonio Zanolini (March 31, 1887 – February 12, 1973) was an Italian gymnast who competed in the 1912 Summer Olympics. He was part of the Italian team, which won the gold medal in the gymnastics men's team, European system event in 1912.
