= Yngve Stiernspetz =

Swedish gymnast

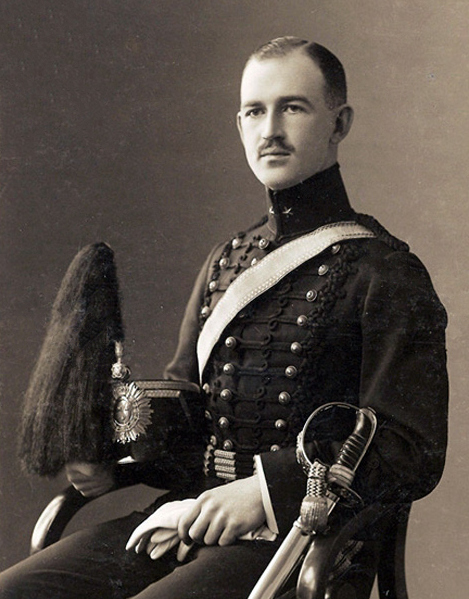
- Stiernspetz c. 1912

Personal information
- Born: 27 April 1887 Eksjö, United Kingdoms of Sweden and Norway
- Died: 4 April 1945 (aged 57) Lidingö, Sweden

Gymnastics career
- Discipline: Men's artistic gymnastics
- Country represented: Sweden
- Club: Stockholms Gymnastikförening
Medal record
Men's artistic gymnastics
Representing Sweden
Olympic Games
Gold medal – first place	1912 Stockholm	Team, Swedish system

Yngve Stiernspetz (27 April 1887 – 4 April 1945) was a Swedish gymnast who competed in the 1912 Summer Olympics. He was part of the Swedish team that won the all-around Swedish system event.

After graduating from high school, Stiernspetz enlisted in the Swedish artillery. He was promoted to captain in 1925 and two years later became head of the Småland Artillery Regiment. In 1931, he was awarded with the Order of the Sword.
