= Per Bertilsson =

Swedish artistic gymnast

- Full name: Per Daniel Bertilsson
- Born: 4 December 1892 Drängsered, United Kingdoms of Sweden and Norway
- Died: 18 September 1972 (aged 79) Gothenburg, Sweden
- Relatives: Carl Bertilsson (brother)

Gymnastics career
- Discipline: Men's artistic gymnastics
- Country represented: Sweden
- Club: Göteborgs Gymnastiksällskap
Medal record
Men's artistic gymnastics
Representing Sweden
Olympic Games
Gold medal – first place	1912 Stockholm	Team, Swedish system

Per Daniel Bertilsson (December 4, 1892 – September 18, 1972) was a Swedish gymnast who competed in the 1912 Summer Olympics. He was part of the Swedish team, which won the gold medal in the gymnastics men's team, Swedish system event.
