= Olaf Ingebretsen =

Norwegian gymnast

- Born: 24 May 1892 Kristiania, United Kingdoms of Sweden and Norway
- Died: 20 July 1971 (aged 79) Bærum, Norway

Gymnastics career
- Discipline: Men's artistic gymnastics
- Country represented: Norway
- Gym: Chistiania Turnforening
Medal record
Men's artistic gymnastics
Representing Norway
Olympic Games
Bronze medal – third place	1912 Stockholm	Team, Swedish system

Olaf Ingebretsen (24 May 1892 – 20 July 1971) was a Norwegian gymnast who competed in the 1912 Summer Olympics. He was part of the Norwegian gymnastics team, which won the bronze medal in the gymnastics men's team, Swedish system event.
