= Valdemar Bøggild =

Danish gymnast

- Full name: Valdemar Jensen Bøggild
- Born: 30 September 1883 Ringe, Denmark
- Died: 2 July 1943 (aged 59) Ringe, Denmark

Gymnastics career
- Discipline: Men's artistic gymnastics
- Country represented: Denmark
Medal record
Men's artistic gymnastics
Representing Denmark
Olympic Games
Silver medal – second place	1912 Stockholm	Team, Swedish system

Valdemar Jensen Bøggild (30 September 1893 in Ringe, Denmark – 2 July 1943 in Ringe, Denmark) was a Danish gymnast who competed in the 1912 Summer Olympics. He was part of the Danish team, which won the silver medal in the gymnastics men's team, Swedish system event.
