= Eugen Ingebretsen =

Norwegian gymnast (1884–1939)

- Full name: Carl Eugen Ingebretsen
- Born: 30 December 1884 Kristiania, United Kingdoms of Sweden and Norway
- Died: 11 January 1939 (aged 54) Oslo, Norway

Gymnastics career
- Discipline: Men's artistic gymnastics
- Country represented: Norway
- Gym: Chistiania Turnforening
Medal record
Men's artistic gymnastics
Representing Norway
Olympic Games
Silver medal – second place	1908 London	Team
Bronze medal – third place	1912 Stockholm	Team, Swedish system
Intercalated Games
Gold medal – first place	1906 Athens	Team

Carl Eugen Ingebretsen (30 December 1884 – 11 January 1939) was a Norwegian gymnast who competed in the 1906 Intercalated Games, in the 1908 Summer Olympics, and in the 1912 Summer Olympics.

At the 1906 Intercalated Games in Athens, he was a member of the Norwegian team, which won the gold medal in the gymnastics team event.

In 1908, he won a silver medal in the gymnastics team event with the Norwegian team. He also competed in the all-around event, but his result is unknown.

Four years later, he was part of the Norwegian gymnastics team, which won the bronze medal in the gymnastics men's team Swedish system event.
