= Rolf Robach =

Norwegian gymnast (1885–1963)

- Born: 6 December 1885 Kristiania, United Kingdoms of Sweden and Norway
- Died: 10 June 1963 (aged 77) Oslo, Norway

Gymnastics career
- Discipline: Men's artistic gymnastics
- Country represented: Norway
- Club: Chistiania Turnforening
Medal record
Men's artistic gymnastics
Representing Norway
Olympic Games
Bronze medal – third place	1912 Stockholm	Team, Swedish system

Rolf Robach (6 December 1885 – 10 June 1963) was a Norwegian gymnast who competed in the 1912 Summer Olympics. He was part of the Norwegian gymnastics team, which won the bronze medal in the gymnastics men's team, Swedish system event.
