= List of Olympic medalists in gymnastics (men) =

This is the complete list of men's Olympic medalists in gymnastics.

Since 2021, the International Olympic Committee (IOC) has also listed the medals from the athletics triathlon event at the 1904 Summer Olympics as part of artistic gymnastics under the designation "Individual All-Around, Field Sports Men".

This is event is not included in the results below, as this classification reflects a later IOC attribution rather than the event's historical sporting classification.

== Artistic gymnastics ==
=== Current program ===
==== All-around, individual ====
Games	Gold	Silver	Bronze
1900 Paris	Gustave Sandras; France	Noël Bas; France	Lucien Démanet; France
1904 St. Louis	Julius Lenhart (AUT) (Note: The medals won by Julius Lenhart (AUT) and Adolf Spinnler (SUI) at the 1904 Summer Olympics are attributed by the International Olympic Committee (IOC) according to the national affiliation of the club or team they represented, rather than their nationality. (Note: In 2024, the IOC reinstated its original and current attribution policy for athletes at the early Olympic Games (1896–1904). From 2021 to 2024, the IOC briefly attributed medals in individual events according to the athlete's nationality, even when the athlete represented a foreign club or team. Since 2024, participation and medals have instead been attributed according to the national affiliation of the club or team represented by the athlete.) As Lenhart represented an American club and Spinnler a German club, their results are attributed to the United States and Germany, respectively.); United States	Wilhelm Weber; Germany	Adolf Spinnler (SUI); Germany
1908 London	Alberto Braglia; Italy	Walter Tysall; Great Britain	Louis Ségura; France
1912 Stockholm	Alberto Braglia; Italy	Louis Ségura; France	Adolfo Tunesi; Italy
1920 Antwerp	Giorgio Zampori; Italy	Marco Torrès; France	Jean Gounot; France
1924 Paris	Leon Štukelj; Yugoslavia	Robert Pražák; Czechoslovakia	Bedřich Šupčík; Czechoslovakia
1928 Amsterdam	Georges Miez; Switzerland	Hermann Hänggi; Switzerland	Leon Štukelj; Yugoslavia
1932 Los Angeles	Romeo Neri; Italy	István Pelle; Hungary	Heikki Savolainen; Finland
1936 Berlin	Alfred Schwarzmann; Germany	Eugen Mack; Switzerland	Konrad Frey; Germany
1948 London	Veikko Huhtanen; Finland	Walter Lehmann; Switzerland	Paavo Aaltonen; Finland
1952 Helsinki	Viktor Chukarin; Soviet Union	Hrant Shahinyan; Soviet Union	Josef Stalder; Switzerland
1956 Melbourne	Viktor Chukarin; Soviet Union	Takashi Ono; Japan	Yuri Titov; Soviet Union
1960 Rome	Boris Shakhlin; Soviet Union	Takashi Ono; Japan	Yuri Titov; Soviet Union
1964 Tokyo	Yukio Endo; Japan	Viktor Lisitsky; Soviet Union	none awarded
1964 Tokyo	Yukio Endo; Japan	Boris Shakhlin; Soviet Union	none awarded
1964 Tokyo	Yukio Endo; Japan	Shuji Tsurumi; Japan	none awarded
1968 Mexico City	Sawao Kato; Japan	Mikhail Voronin; Soviet Union	Akinori Nakayama; Japan
1972 Munich	Sawao Kato; Japan	Eizo Kenmotsu; Japan	Akinori Nakayama; Japan
1976 Montreal	Nikolai Andrianov; Soviet Union	Sawao Kato; Japan	Mitsuo Tsukahara; Japan
1980 Moscow	Alexander Dityatin; Soviet Union	Nikolai Andrianov; Soviet Union	Stoyan Deltchev; Bulgaria
1984 Los Angeles	Kōji Gushiken; Japan	Peter Vidmar; United States	Li Ning; China
1988 Seoul	Vladimir Artemov; Soviet Union	Valeri Liukin; Soviet Union	Dmitry Bilozerchev; Soviet Union
1992 Barcelona	Vitaly Scherbo; Unified Team	Grigory Misutin; Unified Team	Valery Belenky; Unified Team
1996 Atlanta	Li Xiaoshuang; China	Alexei Nemov; Russia	Vitaly Scherbo; Belarus
2000 Sydney	Alexei Nemov; Russia	Yang Wei; China	Oleksandr Beresh; Ukraine
2004 Athens	Paul Hamm; United States	Kim Dae-eun; South Korea	Yang Tae-young; South Korea
2008 Beijing	Yang Wei; China	Kōhei Uchimura; Japan	Benoît Caranobe; France
2012 London	Kōhei Uchimura; Japan	Marcel Nguyen; Germany	Danell Leyva; United States
2016 Rio de Janeiro	Kōhei Uchimura; Japan	Oleg Verniaiev; Ukraine	Max Whitlock; Great Britain
2020 Tokyo	Daiki Hashimoto; Japan	Xiao Ruoteng; China	Nikita Nagornyy; ROC
2024 Paris	Shinnosuke Oka; Japan	Zhang Boheng; China	Xiao Ruoteng; China
2028 Los Angeles			

==== All-around, team ====
Games	Gold	Silver	Bronze
1904 St. Louis	United States; John Grieb; Anton Heida; Max Hess; Philip Kassel; Julius Lenhart (AUT); Ernst Reckeweg	United States; Emil Beyer; John Bissinger; Arthur Rosenkampff; Julian Schmitz; Otto Steffen; Max Wolf	United States; John Duha; Charles Krause; George Mayer; Robert Maysack; Philip Schuster; Edward Siegler
1908 London	Sweden; Gösta Åsbrink; Carl Bertilsson; Hjalmar Cedercrona; Andreas Cervin; Rudolf Degermark; Carl Folcker; Sven Forssman; Erik Granfelt; Carl Hårleman; Nils Hellsten; Gunnar Höjer; Arvid Holmberg; Carl Holmberg; Oswald Holmberg; Hugo Jahnke; Johan Jarlén; Gustaf Johnsson; Rolf Johnsson; Nils von Kantzow; Sven Landberg; Olle Lanner; Axel Ljung; Osvald Moberg; Carl Martin Norberg; Erik Norberg; Tor Norberg; Axel Norling; Daniel Norling; Gösta Olson; Leonard Peterson; Sven Rosén; Gustaf Rosenquist; Axel Sjöblom; Birger Sörvik; Haakon Sörvik; Karl Johan Svensson; Karl-Gustaf Vingqvist; Nils Widforss	Norway; Arthur Amundsen; Carl Albert Andersen; Otto Authén; Hermann Bohne; Trygve Bøyesen; Oskar Bye; Conrad Carlsrud; Sverre Grøner; Harald Halvorsen; Harald Hansen; Petter Hol; Eugen Ingebretsen; Ole Iversen; Per Mathias Jespersen; Sigge Johannessen; Nicolai Kiær; Carl Klæth; Thor Larsen; Rolf Lefdahl; Hans Lem; Anders Moen; Frithjof Olsen; Carl Alfred Pedersen; Paul Pedersen; Sigvard Sivertsen; John Skrataas; Harald Smedvik; Andreas Strand; Olaf Syvertsen; Thomas Thorstensen	Finland; Eino Forsström; Otto Granström; Johan Kemp; Iivari Kyykoski; Heikki Lehmusto; John Lindroth; Yrjö Linko; Edvard Linna; Matti Markkanen; Kalle Mikkolainen; Veli Nieminen; Kalle Kustaa Paasia; Arvi Pohjanpää; Aarne Pohjonen; Eino Railio; Ale Riipinen; Arno Saarinen; Einar Sahlstein; Aarne Salovaara; Torsten Sandelin; Elis Sipilä; Viktor Smeds; Kaarlo Soinio; Kurt Stenberg; Väinö Tiiri; Magnus Wegelius
1912 Stockholm	Italy; Pietro Bianchi; Guido Boni; Alberto Braglia; Giuseppe Domenichelli; Carlo Fregosi; Alfredo Gollini; Francesco Loi; Luigi Maiocco; Giovanni Mangiante; Lorenzo Mangiante; Serafino Mazzarochi; Guido Romano; Paolo Salvi; Luciano Savorini; Adolfo Tunesi; Giorgio Zampori; Umberto Zanolini; Angelo Zorzi	Hungary; József Bittenbinder; Imre Erdődy; Samu Fóti; Imre Gellért; Győző Haberfeld; Ottó Hellmich; István Herczeg; József Keresztessy; Lajos Kmetykó; János Krizmanich; Elemér Pászti; Árpád Pédery; Jenõ Rittich; Ferenc Szüts; Ödön Téry; Géza Tuli	Great Britain; Albert Betts; William Cowhig; Sidney Cross; Harold Dickason; Herbert Drury; Bernard Franklin; Leonard Hanson; Samuel Hodgetts; Charles Luck; William MacKune; Ronald McLean; Alfred Messenger; Henry Oberholzer; Edward Pepper; Edward Potts; Reginald Potts; George Ross; Charles Simmons; Arthur Southern; William Titt; Charles Vigurs; Samuel Walker; John Whitaker
1920 Antwerp	Italy; Arnaldo Andreoli; Ettore Bellotto; Pietro Bianchi; Fernando Bonatti; Luigi Cambiaso; Luigi Contessi; Carlo Costigliolo; Luigi Costigliolo; Giuseppe Domenichelli; Roberto Ferrari; Carlo Fregosi; Romualdo Ghiglione; Ambrogio Levati; Francesco Loi; Vittorio Lucchetti; Luigi Maiocco; Ferdinando Mandrini; Lorenzo Mangiante; Antonio Marovelli; Michele Mastromarino; Giuseppe Paris; Manlio Pastorini; Ezio Roselli; Paolo Salvi; Giovanni Tubino; Giorgio Zampori; Angelo Zorzi	Belgium; Eugenius Auwerkerken; Théophile Bauer; François Claessens; Augustus Cootmans; Frans Gibens; Albert Haepers; Domien Jacob; Félicien Kempeneers; Jules Labéeu; Hubert Lafortune; Auguste Landrieu; Charles Lannie; Constant Loriot; Nicolaas Moerloos; Ferdinand Minnaert; Louis Stoop; Jean Van Guysse; Alphonse Van Mele; François Verboven; Jean Verboven; Julien Verdonck; Joseph Verstraeten; Georges Vivex; Julianus Wagemans	France; Georges Berger; Émile Bouchès; René Boulanger; Alfred Buyenne; Eugène Cordonnier; Léon Delsarte; Lucien Démanet; Paul Durin; Victor Duvant; Fernand Fauconnier; Arthur Hermann; Albert Hersoy; Alphonse Higelin; Auguste Hoël; Louis Quempe; Georges Lagouge; Paulin Lemaire; Ernest Lespinasse; Émile Boitelle; Jules Pirard; Eugène Pollet; Georges Thurnherr; Marco Torrès; François Walker; Julien Wartelle; Paul Wartelle
1924 Paris	Italy; Luigi Cambiaso; Mario Lertora; Vittorio Lucchetti; Luigi Maiocco; Ferdinando Mandrini; Francesco Martino; Giuseppe Paris; Giorgio Zampori	France; Eugène Cordonnier; Léon Delsarte; François Gangloff; Jean Gounot; Arthur Hermann; Alphonse Higelin; Joseph Huber; Albert Séguin	Switzerland; Hans Grieder; August Güttinger; Jean Gutweninger; Georges Miez; Otto Pfister; Antoine Rebetez; Carl Widmer; Josef Wilhelm
1928 Amsterdam	Switzerland; Hans Grieder; August Güttinger; Hermann Hänggi; Eugen Mack; Georges Miez; Otto Pfister; Eduard Steinemann; Melchior Wezel	Czechoslovakia; Josef Effenberger; Jan Gajdoš; Jan Koutný; Emanuel Löffler; Bedřich Šupčík; Ladislav Tikal; Ladislav Vácha; Václav Veselý	Yugoslavia; Edvard Antonijevič; Dragutin Cioti; Stane Derganc; Boris Gregorka; Anton Malej; Ivan Porenta; Josip Primožič; Leon Štukelj
1932 Los Angeles	Italy; Oreste Capuzzo; Savino Guglielmetti; Mario Lertora; Romeo Neri; Franco Tognini	United States; Frank Haubold; Frank Cumiskey; Al Jochim; Fred Meyer; Michael Schuler	Finland; Mauri Nyberg-Noroma; Ilmari Pakarinen; Heikki Savolainen; Einari Teräsvirta; Martti Uosikkinen
1936 Berlin	Germany; Franz Beckert; Konrad Frey; Alfred Schwarzmann; Willi Stadel; Innozenz Stangl; Walter Steffens; Matthias Volz; Ernst Winter	Switzerland; Walter Bach; Albert Bachmann; Walter Beck; Eugen Mack; Georges Miez; Michael Reusch; Eduard Steinemann; Josef Walter	Finland; Mauri Nyberg-Noroma; Veikko Pakarinen; Aleksanteri Saarvala; Heikki Savolainen; Esa Seeste; Einari Teräsvirta; Eino Tukiainen; Martti Uosikkinen
1948 London	Finland; Paavo Aaltonen; Veikko Huhtanen; Kalevi Laitinen; Olavi Rove; Aleksanteri Saarvala; Sulo Salmi; Heikki Savolainen; Einari Teräsvirta	Switzerland; Karl Frei; Christian Kipfer; Walter Lehmann; Robert Lucy; Michael Reusch; Josef Stalder; Emil Studer; Melchior Thalmann	Hungary; László Baranyai; Jozsef Fekete; Gyözö Mogyorosi; János Mogyorósi-Klencs; Ferenc Pataki; Lajos Sántha; Lajos Tóth; Ferenc Várkõi
1952 Helsinki	Soviet Union; Vladimir Belyakov; Iosif Berdiev; Viktor Chukarin; Yevgeny Korolkov; Dmytro Leonkin; Valentin Muratov; Mikhail Perlman; Hrant Shahinyan	Switzerland; Hans Eugster; Ernst Fivian; Ernst Gebendinger; Jack Günthard; Hans Schwarzentruber; Josef Stalder; Melchior Thalmann; Jean Tschabold	Finland; Paavo Aaltonen; Kalevi Laitinen; Onni Lappalainen; Kaino Lempinen; Berndt Lindfors; Olavi Rove; Heikki Savolainen; Kalevi Viskari
1956 Melbourne	Soviet Union; Albert Azaryan; Viktor Chukarin; Valentin Muratov; Boris Shakhlin; Pavel Stolbov; Yuri Titov	Japan; Nobuyuki Aihara; Akira Kono; Masami Kubota; Takashi Ono; Masao Takemoto; Shinsaku Tsukawaki	Finland; Raimo Heinonen; Olavi Laimuvirta; Onni Lappalainen; Berndt Lindfors; Martti Mansikka; Kalevi Suoniemi
1960 Rome	Japan; Nobuyuki Aihara; Yukio Endō; Takashi Mitsukuri; Takashi Ono; Masao Takemoto; Shuji Tsurumi	Soviet Union; Albert Azaryan; Valery Kerdemilidi; Nikolai Miligulo; Vladimir Portnoi; Boris Shakhlin; Yuri Titov	Italy; Giovanni Carminucci; Pasquale Carminucci; Gianfranco Marzolla; Franco Menichelli; Orlando Polmonari; Angelo Vicardi
1964 Tokyo	Japan; Yukio Endō; Takuji Hayata; Takashi Mitsukuri; Takashi Ono; Shuji Tsurumi; Haruhiro Yamashita	Soviet Union; Sergey Diomidov; Viktor Leontyev; Viktor Lisitsky; Boris Shakhlin; Yuri Titov; Yury Tsapenko	United Team of Germany; Siegfried Fülle; Philipp Fürst; Erwin Koppe; Klaus Köste; Günter Lyhs; Peter Weber
1968 Mexico City	Japan; Yukio Endō; Sawao Kato; Takeshi Katō; Eizo Kenmotsu; Akinori Nakayama; Mitsuo Tsukahara	Soviet Union; Sergey Diomidov; Valery Iljinykh; Valery Karasev; Viktor Klimenko; Victor Lisitsky; Mikhail Voronin	East Germany; Günter Beier; Matthias Brehme; Gerhard Dietrich; Siegfried Fülle; Klaus Köste; Peter Weber
1972 Munich	Japan; Shigeru Kasamatsu; Sawao Kato; Eizo Kenmotsu; Akinori Nakayama; Teruichi Okamura; Mitsuo Tsukahara	Soviet Union; Nikolai Andrianov; Viktor Klimenko; Alexander Maleev; Edvard Mikaelian; Vladimir Schukin; Mikhail Voronin	East Germany; Matthias Brehme; Wolfgang Klotz; Klaus Köste; Jürgen Paeke; Reinhard Rychly; Wolfgang Thüne
1976 Montreal	Japan; Shun Fujimoto; Hisato Igarashi; Hiroshi Kajiyama; Sawao Kato; Eizo Kenmotsu; Mitsuo Tsukahara	Soviet Union; Nikolai Andrianov; Alexander Dityatin; Gennady Krysin; Vladimir Marchenko; Vladimir Markelov; Vladimir Tikhonov	East Germany; Roland Brückner; Rainer Hanschke; Bernd Jäger; Wolfgang Klotz; Lutz Mack; Michael Nikolay
1980 Moscow	Soviet Union; Nikolai Andrianov; Eduard Azaryan; Alexander Dityatin; Bohdan Makuts; Vladimir Markelov; Aleksandr Tkachyov	East Germany; Ralf-Peter Hemmann; Lutz Hoffmann; Lutz Mack; Michael Nikolay; Andreas Bronst; Roland Brückner	Hungary; Ferenc Donath; György Guczoghy; Zoltan Kelemen; Peter Kovacs; Zoltán Magyar; Istvan Vamos
1984 Los Angeles	United States; Bart Conner; Tim Daggett; Mitch Gaylord; Jim Hartung; Scott Johnson; Peter Vidmar	China; Li Ning; Li Xiaoping; Li Yuejiu; Lou Yun; Tong Fei; Xu Zhiqiang	Japan; Kōji Gushiken; Noritoshi Hirata; Nobuyuki Kajitani; Shinji Morisue; Koji Sotomura; Kyoji Yamawaki
1988 Seoul	Soviet Union; Vladimir Artemov; Dmitry Bilozerchev; Vladimir Gogoladze; Sergey Kharkov; Valeri Liukin; Vladimir Nouvikov	East Germany; Holger Behrendt; Ralf Büchner; Ulf Hoffmann; Sylvio Kroll; Sven Tippelt; Andreas Wecker	Japan; Yukio Iketani; Hiroyuki Konishi; Koichi Mizushima; Daisuke Nishikawa; Toshiharu Sato; Takahiro Yameda
1992 Barcelona	Unified Team; Valery Belenky; Ihor Korobchynskyi; Hrihoriy Misyutin; Vitaly Scherbo; Rustam Sharipov; Aleksey Voropayev	China; Guo Linyao; Li Chunyang; Li Dashuang; Li Ge; Li Jing; Li Xiaoshuang	Japan; Yutaka Aihara; Takashi Chinen; Yoshiaki Hatakeda; Yukio Iketani; Masayuki Matsunaga; Daisuke Nishikawa
1996 Atlanta	Russia; Sergey Kharkov; Nikolai Kryukov; Alexei Nemov; Yevgeni Podgorny; Dmitri Trush; Dmitri Vasilenko; Aleksey Voropayev	China; Fan Bin; Fan Hongbin; Huang Huadong; Huang Liping; Li Xiaoshuang; Shen Jian; Zhang Jinjing	Ukraine; Ihor Korobchynskyi; Oleg Kosiak; Hrihoriy Misyutin; Vladimir Shamenko; Rustam Sharipov; Olexander Svitlichni; Yuri Yermakov
2000 Sydney	China; Huang Xu; Li Xiaopeng; Xiao Junfeng; Xing Aowei; Yang Wei; Zheng Lihui	Ukraine; Alexander Beresch; Valeriy Honcharov; Ruslan Mezentsev; Valeri Pereshkura; Olexander Svitlichni; Roman Zozulya	Russia; Maxim Aleshin; Alexei Bondarenko; Dmitri Drevin; Nikolai Kryukov; Alexei Nemov; Yevgeni Podgorny
2004 Athens	Japan; Takehiro Kashima; Hisashi Mizutori; Daisuke Nakano; Hiroyuki Tomita; Naoya Tsukahara; Isao Yoneda	United States; Jason Gatson; Morgan Hamm; Paul Hamm; Brett McClure; Blaine Wilson; Guard Young	Romania; Marian Drăgulescu; Ilie Daniel Popescu; Dan Nicolae Potra; Răzvan Dorin Şelariu; Ioan Silviu Suciu; Marius Urzică
2008 Beijing	China; Chen Yibing; Huang Xu; Li Xiaopeng; Xiao Qin; Yang Wei; Zou Kai	Japan; Takehiro Kashima; Takuya Nakase; Makoto Okiguchi; Koki Sakamoto; Hiroyuki Tomita; Kōhei Uchimura	United States; Alexander Artemev; Raj Bhavsar; Joe Hagerty; Jonathan Horton; Justin Spring; Kai Wen Tan
2012 London	China; Chen Yibing; Feng Zhe; Guo Weiyang; Zhang Chenglong; Zou Kai	Japan; Ryohei Kato; Kazuhito Tanaka; Yusuke Tanaka; Kōhei Uchimura; Koji Yamamuro	Great Britain; Sam Oldham; Daniel Purvis; Louis Smith; Kristian Thomas; Max Whitlock
2016 Rio de Janeiro	Japan (JPN); Kenzō Shirai; Yūsuke Tanaka; Koji Yamamuro; Kōhei Uchimura; Ryōhei Katō	Russia (RUS); Denis Ablyazin; David Belyavskiy; Ivan Stretovich; Nikolai Kuksenkov; Nikita Nagornyy	China (CHN); Deng Shudi; Lin Chaopan; Liu Yang; You Hao; Zhang Chenglong
2020 Tokyo	ROC (ROC); Denis Ablyazin; David Belyavskiy; Artur Dalaloyan; Nikita Nagornyy	Japan (JPN); Daiki Hashimoto; Kazuma Kaya; Takeru Kitazono; Wataru Tanigawa	China (CHN); Lin Chaopan; Sun Wei; Xiao Ruoteng; Zou Jingyuan
2024 Paris	Japan (JPN); Daiki Hashimoto; Kazuma Kaya; Shinnosuke Oka; Takaaki Sugino; Wataru Tanigawa	China (CHN); Liu Yang; Su Weide; Xiao Ruoteng; Zhang Boheng; Zou Jingyuan	United States (USA); Asher Hong; Paul Juda; Brody Malone; Stephen Nedoroscik; Fred Richard
2028 Los Angeles			

==== Floor exercise ====
Games	Gold	Silver	Bronze
1932 Los Angeles	István Pelle; Hungary	Georges Miez; Switzerland	Mario Lertora; Italy
1936 Berlin	Georges Miez; Switzerland	Josef Walter; Switzerland	Konrad Frey; Germany
1936 Berlin	Georges Miez; Switzerland	Josef Walter; Switzerland	Eugen Mack; Switzerland
1948 London	Ferenc Pataki; Hungary	János Mogyorósi-Klencs; Hungary	Zdenek Ruzicka; Czechoslovakia
1952 Helsinki	William Thoresson; Sweden	Jerzy Jokiel; Poland	none awarded
1952 Helsinki	William Thoresson; Sweden	Tadao Uesako; Japan	none awarded
1956 Melbourne	Valentin Muratov; Soviet Union	Nobuyuki Aihara; Japan	none awarded
1956 Melbourne	Valentin Muratov; Soviet Union	Viktor Chukarin; Soviet Union	none awarded
1956 Melbourne	Valentin Muratov; Soviet Union	William Thoresson; Sweden	none awarded
1960 Rome	Nobuyuki Aihara; Japan	Yuri Titov; Soviet Union	Franco Menichelli; Italy
1964 Tokyo	Franco Menichelli; Italy	Yukio Endo; Japan	none awarded
1964 Tokyo	Franco Menichelli; Italy	Viktor Lisitsky; Soviet Union	none awarded
1968 Mexico City	Sawao Kato; Japan	Akinori Nakayama; Japan	Takeshi Katō; Japan
1972 Munich	Nikolai Andrianov; Soviet Union	Akinori Nakayama; Japan	Shigeru Kasamatsu; Japan
1976 Montreal	Nikolai Andrianov; Soviet Union	Vladimir Marchenko; Soviet Union	Peter Kormann; United States
1980 Moscow	Roland Brückner; East Germany	Nikolai Andrianov; Soviet Union	Alexander Dityatin; Soviet Union
1984 Los Angeles	Li Ning; China	Lou Yun; China	Koji Sotomura; Japan
1984 Los Angeles	Li Ning; China	Lou Yun; China	Philippe Vatuone; France
1988 Seoul	Sergei Kharkov; Soviet Union	Vladimir Artemov; Soviet Union	Yukio Iketani; Japan
1988 Seoul	Sergei Kharkov; Soviet Union	Vladimir Artemov; Soviet Union	Lou Yun; China
1992 Barcelona	Li Xiaoshuang; China	Yukio Iketani; Japan	none awarded
1992 Barcelona	Li Xiaoshuang; China	Hrihoriy Misyutin; Unified Team	none awarded
1996 Atlanta	Ioannis Melissanidis; Greece	Li Xiaoshuang; China	Alexei Nemov; Russia
2000 Sydney	Igors Vihrovs; Latvia	Alexei Nemov; Russia	Yordan Yovchev; Bulgaria
2004 Athens	Kyle Shewfelt; Canada	Marian Drăgulescu; Romania	Yordan Yovchev; Bulgaria
2008 Beijing	Zou Kai; China	Gervasio Deferr; Spain	Anton Golotsutskov; Russia
2012 London	Zou Kai; China	Kōhei Uchimura; Japan	Denis Ablyazin; Russia
2016 Rio de Janeiro	Max Whitlock; Great Britain	Diego Hypólito; Brazil	Arthur Mariano; Brazil
2020 Tokyo	Artem Dolgopyat; Israel	Rayderley Zapata; Spain	Xiao Ruoteng; China
2024 Paris	Carlos Yulo; Philippines	Artem Dolgopyat; Israel	Jake Jarman; Great Britain
2028 Los Angeles			

==== Horizontal bar ====
Games	Gold	Silver	Bronze
1896 Athens	Hermann Weingärtner; Germany	Alfred Flatow; Germany	none awarded
1900 Paris	not included in the Olympic program		
1904 St. Louis	Anton Heida; United States	none awarded	George Eyser; United States
1904 St. Louis	Edward Hennig; United States	none awarded	George Eyser; United States
1908–1920	not included in the Olympic program		
1924 Paris	Leon Štukelj; Yugoslavia	Jean Gutweninger; Switzerland	André Higelin; France
1928 Amsterdam	Georges Miez; Switzerland	Romeo Neri; Italy	Eugen Mack; Switzerland
1932 Los Angeles	Dallas Bixler; United States	Heikki Savolainen; Finland	Einari Teräsvirta; Finland
1936 Berlin	Aleksanteri Saarvala; Finland	Konrad Frey; Germany	Alfred Schwarzmann; Germany
1948 London	Josef Stalder; Switzerland	Walter Lehmann; Switzerland	Veikko Huhtanen; Finland
1952 Helsinki	Jack Günthard; Switzerland	Alfred Schwarzmann; Germany	none awarded
1952 Helsinki	Jack Günthard; Switzerland	Josef Stalder; Switzerland	none awarded
1956 Melbourne	Takashi Ono; Japan	Yuri Titov; Soviet Union	Masao Takemoto; Japan
1960 Rome	Takashi Ono; Japan	Masao Takemoto; Japan	Boris Shakhlin; Soviet Union
1964 Tokyo	Boris Shakhlin; Soviet Union	Yuri Titov; Soviet Union	Miroslav Cerar; Yugoslavia
1968 Mexico City	Akinori Nakayama; Japan	none awarded	Eizo Kenmotsu; Japan
1968 Mexico City	Mikhail Voronin; Soviet Union	none awarded	Eizo Kenmotsu; Japan
1972 Munich	Mitsuo Tsukahara; Japan	Sawao Kato; Japan	Shigeru Kasamatsu; Japan
1976 Montreal	Mitsuo Tsukahara; Japan	Eizo Kenmotsu; Japan	Eberhard Gienger; West Germany
1980 Moscow	Stoyan Deltchev; Bulgaria	Alexander Dityatin; Soviet Union	Nikolai Andrianov; Soviet Union
1984 Los Angeles	Shinji Morisue; Japan	Tong Fei; China	Kōji Gushiken; Japan
1988 Seoul	Vladimir Artemov; Soviet Union	none awarded	Holger Behrendt; East Germany
1988 Seoul	Valeri Liukin; Soviet Union	none awarded	Marius Gherman; Romania
1992 Barcelona	Trent Dimas; United States	Andreas Wecker; Germany	none awarded
1992 Barcelona	Trent Dimas; United States	Grigory Misutin; Unified Team	none awarded
1996 Atlanta	Andreas Wecker; Germany	Krasimir Dunev; Bulgaria	Fan Bin; China
1996 Atlanta	Andreas Wecker; Germany	Krasimir Dunev; Bulgaria	Alexei Nemov; Russia
1996 Atlanta	Andreas Wecker; Germany	Krasimir Dunev; Bulgaria	Vitaly Scherbo; Belarus
2000 Sydney	Alexei Nemov; Russia	Benjamin Varonian; France	Lee Joo-Hyung; South Korea
2004 Athens	Igor Cassina; Italy	Paul Hamm; United States	Isao Yoneda; Japan
2008 Beijing	Zou Kai; China	Jonathan Horton; United States	Fabian Hambüchen; Germany
2012 London	Epke Zonderland; Netherlands	Fabian Hambüchen; Germany	Zou Kai; China
2016 Rio de Janeiro	Fabian Hambüchen; Germany	Danell Leyva; United States	Nile Wilson; Great Britain
2020 Tokyo	Daiki Hashimoto; Japan	Tin Srbić; Croatia	Nikita Nagornyy; ROC
2024 Paris	Shinnosuke Oka; Japan	Ángel Barajas; Colombia	Tang Chia-hung; Chinese Taipei
2024 Paris	Shinnosuke Oka; Japan	Ángel Barajas; Colombia	Zhang Boheng; China
2028 Los Angeles			

==== Parallel bars ====
Games	Gold	Silver	Bronze
1896 Athens	Alfred Flatow; Germany	Louis Zutter; Switzerland	none awarded
1900 Paris	not included in the Olympic program		
1904 St. Louis	George Eyser; United States	Anton Heida; United States	John Duha; United States
1908–1920	not included in the Olympic program		
1924 Paris	August Güttinger; Switzerland	Robert Pražák; Czechoslovakia	Giorgio Zampori; Italy
1928 Amsterdam	Ladislav Vácha; Czechoslovakia	Josip Primožič; Yugoslavia	Hermann Hänggi; Switzerland
1932 Los Angeles	Romeo Neri; Italy	István Pelle; Hungary	Heikki Savolainen; Finland
1936 Berlin	Konrad Frey; Germany	Michael Reusch; Switzerland	Alfred Schwarzmann; Germany
1948 London	Michael Reusch; Switzerland	Veikko Huhtanen; Finland	Christian Kipfer; Switzerland
1948 London	Michael Reusch; Switzerland	Veikko Huhtanen; Finland	Josef Stalder; Switzerland
1952 Helsinki	Hans Eugster; Switzerland	Viktor Chukarin; Soviet Union	Josef Stalder; Switzerland
1956 Melbourne	Viktor Chukarin; Soviet Union	Masami Kubota; Japan	Takashi Ono; Japan
1956 Melbourne	Viktor Chukarin; Soviet Union	Masami Kubota; Japan	Masao Takemoto; Japan
1960 Rome	Boris Shakhlin; Soviet Union	Giovanni Carminucci; Italy	Takashi Ono; Japan
1964 Tokyo	Yukio Endo; Japan	Shuji Tsurumi; Japan	Franco Menichelli; Italy
1968 Mexico City	Akinori Nakayama; Japan	Mikhail Voronin; Soviet Union	Viktor Klimenko; Soviet Union
1972 Munich	Sawao Kato; Japan	Shigeru Kasamatsu; Japan	Eizo Kenmotsu; Japan
1976 Montreal	Sawao Kato; Japan	Nikolai Andrianov; Soviet Union	Mitsuo Tsukahara; Japan
1980 Moscow	Aleksandr Tkachyov; Soviet Union	Alexander Dityatin; Soviet Union	Roland Brückner; East Germany
1984 Los Angeles	Bart Conner; United States	Nobuyuki Kajitani; Japan	Mitch Gaylord; United States
1988 Seoul	Vladimir Artemov; Soviet Union	Valeri Liukin; Soviet Union	Sven Tippelt; East Germany
1992 Barcelona	Vitaly Scherbo; Unified Team	Li Jing; China	Ihor Korobchynskyi; Unified Team
1992 Barcelona	Vitaly Scherbo; Unified Team	Li Jing; China	Guo Linyao; China
1992 Barcelona	Vitaly Scherbo; Unified Team	Li Jing; China	Masayuki Matsunaga; Japan
1996 Atlanta	Rustam Sharipov; Ukraine	Jair Lynch; United States	Vitaly Scherbo; Belarus
2000 Sydney	Li Xiaopeng; China	Lee Joo-Hyung; South Korea	Alexei Nemov; Russia
2004 Athens	Valeriy Honcharov; Ukraine	Hiroyuki Tomita; Japan	Li Xiaopeng; China
2008 Beijing	Li Xiaopeng; China	Yoo Won-Chul; South Korea	Anton Fokin; Uzbekistan
2012 London	Feng Zhe; China	Marcel Nguyen; Germany	Hamilton Sabot; France
2016 Rio de Janeiro	Oleg Verniaiev; Ukraine	Danell Leyva; United States	David Belyavskiy; Russia
2020 Tokyo	Zou Jingyuan; China	Lukas Dauser; Germany	Ferhat Arican; Turkey
2024 Paris	Zou Jingyuan; China	Illia Kovtun; Ukraine	Shinnosuke Oka; Japan
2028 Los Angeles			

==== Pommel horse ====
Games	Gold	Silver	Bronze
1896 Athens	Louis Zutter; Switzerland	Hermann Weingärtner; Germany	none awarded
1900 Paris	not included in the Olympic program		
1904 St. Louis	Anton Heida; United States	George Eyser; United States	William Merz; United States
1908–1920	not included in the Olympic program		
1924 Paris	Josef Wilhelm; Switzerland	Jean Gutweninger; Switzerland	Antoine Rebetez; Switzerland
1928 Amsterdam	Hermann Hänggi; Switzerland	Georges Miez; Switzerland	Heikki Savolainen; Finland
1932 Los Angeles	István Pelle; Hungary	Omero Bonoli; Italy	Frank Haubold; United States
1936 Berlin	Konrad Frey; Germany	Eugen Mack; Switzerland	Albert Bachmann; Switzerland
1948 London	Paavo Aaltonen; Finland	none awarded	none awarded
1948 London	Veikko Huhtanen; Finland	none awarded	none awarded
1948 London	Heikki Savolainen; Finland	none awarded	none awarded
1952 Helsinki	Viktor Chukarin; Soviet Union	Yevgeny Korolkov; Soviet Union	none awarded
1952 Helsinki	Viktor Chukarin; Soviet Union	Hrant Shahinyan; Soviet Union	none awarded
1956 Melbourne	Boris Shakhlin; Soviet Union	Takashi Ono; Japan	Viktor Chukarin; Soviet Union
1960 Rome	Eugen Ekman; Finland	none awarded	Shuji Tsurumi; Japan
1960 Rome	Boris Shakhlin; Soviet Union	none awarded	Shuji Tsurumi; Japan
1964 Tokyo	Miroslav Cerar; Yugoslavia	Shuji Tsurumi; Japan	Yury Tsapenko; Soviet Union
1968 Mexico City	Miroslav Cerar; Yugoslavia	Olli Laiho; Finland	Mikhail Voronin; Soviet Union
1972 Munich	Viktor Klimenko; Soviet Union	Sawao Kato; Japan	Eizo Kenmotsu; Japan
1976 Montreal	Zoltán Magyar; Hungary	Eizo Kenmotsu; Japan	Nikolai Andrianov; Soviet Union
1976 Montreal	Zoltán Magyar; Hungary	Eizo Kenmotsu; Japan	Michael Nikolay; East Germany
1980 Moscow	Zoltán Magyar; Hungary	Alexander Dityatin; Soviet Union	Michael Nikolay; East Germany
1984 Los Angeles	Li Ning; China	none awarded	Timothy Daggett; United States
1984 Los Angeles	Peter Vidmar; United States	none awarded	Timothy Daggett; United States
1988 Seoul	Dmitry Bilozerchev; Soviet Union	none awarded	none awarded
1988 Seoul	Zsolt Borkai; Hungary	none awarded	none awarded
1988 Seoul	Lubomir Geraskov; Bulgaria	none awarded	none awarded
1992 Barcelona	Pae Gil-su; North Korea	none awarded	Andreas Wecker; Germany
1992 Barcelona	Vitaly Scherbo; Unified Team	none awarded	Andreas Wecker; Germany
1996 Atlanta	Donghua Li; Switzerland	Marius Urzică; Romania	Alexei Nemov; Russia
2000 Sydney	Marius Urzică; Romania	Eric Poujade; France	Alexei Nemov; Russia
2004 Athens	Teng Haibin; China	Marius Urzică; Romania	Takehiro Kashima; Japan
2008 Beijing	Xiao Qin; China	Filip Ude; Croatia	Louis Smith; Great Britain
2012 London	Krisztián Berki; Hungary	Louis Smith; Great Britain	Max Whitlock; Great Britain
2016 Rio de Janeiro	Max Whitlock; Great Britain	Louis Smith; Great Britain	Alexander Naddour; United States
2020 Tokyo	Max Whitlock; Great Britain	Lee Chih-kai; Chinese Taipei	Kazuma Kaya; Japan
2024 Paris	Rhys McClenaghan; Ireland	Nariman Kurbanov; Kazakhstan	Stephen Nedoroscik; United States
2028 Los Angeles			

==== Rings ====
Games	Gold	Silver	Bronze
1896 Athens	Ioannis Mitropoulos; Greece	Hermann Weingärtner; Germany	Petros Persakis; Greece
1900 Paris	not included in the Olympic program		
1904 St. Louis	Herman Glass; United States	William Merz; United States	Emil Voigt; United States
1908–1920	not included in the Olympic program		
1924 Paris	Francesco Martino; Italy	Robert Pražák; Czechoslovakia	Ladislav Vácha; Czechoslovakia
1928 Amsterdam	Leon Štukelj; Yugoslavia	Ladislav Vácha; Czechoslovakia	Emanuel Löffler; Czechoslovakia
1932 Los Angeles	George Gulack; United States	Bill Denton; United States	Giovanni Lattuada; Italy
1936 Berlin	Alois Hudec; Czechoslovakia	Leon Štukelj; Yugoslavia	Matthias Volz; Germany
1948 London	Karl Frei; Switzerland	Michael Reusch; Switzerland	Zdenek Ruzicka; Czechoslovakia
1952 Helsinki	Hrant Shahinyan; Soviet Union	Viktor Chukarin; Soviet Union	Hans Eugster; Switzerland
1952 Helsinki	Hrant Shahinyan; Soviet Union	Viktor Chukarin; Soviet Union	Dmitri Leonkin; Soviet Union
1956 Melbourne	Albert Azaryan; Soviet Union	Valentin Muratov; Soviet Union	Masao Takemoto; Japan
1956 Melbourne	Albert Azaryan; Soviet Union	Valentin Muratov; Soviet Union	Masami Kubota; Japan
1960 Rome	Albert Azaryan; Soviet Union	Boris Shakhlin; Soviet Union	Velik Kapsazov; Bulgaria
1960 Rome	Albert Azaryan; Soviet Union	Boris Shakhlin; Soviet Union	Takashi Ono; Japan
1964 Tokyo	Takuji Hayata; Japan	Franco Menichelli; Italy	Boris Shakhlin; Soviet Union
1968 Mexico City	Akinori Nakayama; Japan	Mikhail Voronin; Soviet Union	Sawao Kato; Japan
1972 Munich	Akinori Nakayama; Japan	Mikhail Voronin; Soviet Union	Mitsuo Tsukahara; Japan
1976 Montreal	Nikolai Andrianov; Soviet Union	Alexander Dityatin; Soviet Union	Danuţ Grecu; Romania
1980 Moscow	Alexander Dityatin; Soviet Union	Aleksandr Tkachyov; Soviet Union	Jiri Tabak; Czechoslovakia
1984 Los Angeles	Kōji Gushiken; Japan	none awarded	Mitch Gaylord; United States
1984 Los Angeles	Li Ning; China	none awarded	Mitch Gaylord; United States
1988 Seoul	Holger Behrendt; East Germany	none awarded	Sven Tippelt; East Germany
1988 Seoul	Dmitry Bilozerchev; Soviet Union	none awarded	Sven Tippelt; East Germany
1992 Barcelona	Vitaly Scherbo; Unified Team	Li Jing; China	Andreas Wecker; Germany; Li Xiaoshuang; China
1996 Atlanta	Jury Chechi; Italy	Dan Burincă; Romania; Szilveszter Csollány; Hungary	none awarded
2000 Sydney	Szilveszter Csollány; Hungary	Dimosthenis Tampakos; Greece	Yordan Yovchev; Bulgaria
2004 Athens	Dimosthenis Tampakos; Greece	Yordan Yovchev; Bulgaria	Jury Chechi; Italy
2008 Beijing	Chen Yibing; China	Yang Wei; China	Oleksandr Vorobiov; Ukraine
2012 London	Arthur Zanetti; Brazil	Chen Yibing; China	Matteo Morandi; Italy
2016 Rio de Janeiro	Eleftherios Petrounias; Greece	Arthur Zanetti; Brazil	Denis Ablyazin; Russia
2020 Tokyo	Liu Yang; China	You Hao; China	Eleftherios Petrounias; Greece
2024 Paris	Liu Yang; China	Zou Jingyuan; China	Eleftherios Petrounias; Greece
2028 Los Angeles			

==== Vault ====
Games	Gold	Silver	Bronze
1896 Athens	Carl Schuhmann; Germany	Louis Zutter; Switzerland	Hermann Weingärtner; Germany
1900 Paris	not included in the Olympic program		
1904 St. Louis	George Eyser; United States	none awarded	William Merz; United States
1904 St. Louis	Anton Heida; United States	none awarded	William Merz; United States
1908–1920	not included in the Olympic program		
1924 Paris	Frank Kriz; United States	Jan Koutný; Czechoslovakia	Bohumil Mořkovský; Czechoslovakia
1928 Amsterdam	Eugen Mack; Switzerland	Emanuel Löffler; Czechoslovakia	Stane Derganc; Yugoslavia
1932 Los Angeles	Savino Guglielmetti; Italy	Al Jochim; United States	Ed Carmichael; United States
1936 Berlin	Alfred Schwarzmann; Germany	Eugen Mack; Switzerland	Matthias Volz; Germany
1948 London	Paavo Aaltonen; Finland	Olavi Rove; Finland	János Mogyorósi-Klencs; Hungary
1948 London	Paavo Aaltonen; Finland	Olavi Rove; Finland	Ferenc Pataki; Hungary
1948 London	Paavo Aaltonen; Finland	Olavi Rove; Finland	Leo Sotorník; Czechoslovakia
1952 Helsinki	Viktor Chukarin; Soviet Union	Masao Takemoto; Japan	Takashi Ono; Japan
1952 Helsinki	Viktor Chukarin; Soviet Union	Masao Takemoto; Japan	Tadao Uesako; Japan
1956 Melbourne	Helmut Bantz; United Team of Germany	none awarded	Yuri Titov; Soviet Union
1956 Melbourne	Valentin Muratov; Soviet Union	none awarded	Yuri Titov; Soviet Union
1960 Rome	Takashi Ono; Japan	none awarded	Vladimir Portnoi; Soviet Union
1960 Rome	Boris Shakhlin; Soviet Union	none awarded	Vladimir Portnoi; Soviet Union
1964 Tokyo	Haruhiro Yamashita; Japan	Viktor Lisitsky; Soviet Union	Hannu Rantakari; Finland
1968 Mexico City	Mikhail Voronin; Soviet Union	Yukio Endo; Japan	Sergey Diomidov; Soviet Union
1972 Munich	Klaus Köste; East Germany	Viktor Klimenko; Soviet Union	Nikolai Andrianov; Soviet Union
1976 Montreal	Nikolai Andrianov; Soviet Union	Mitsuo Tsukahara; Japan	Hiroshi Kajiyama; Japan
1980 Moscow	Nikolai Andrianov; Soviet Union	Alexander Dityatin; Soviet Union	Roland Brückner; East Germany
1984 Los Angeles	Lou Yun; China	Mitch Gaylord; United States	none awarded
1984 Los Angeles	Lou Yun; China	Kōji Gushiken; Japan	none awarded
1984 Los Angeles	Lou Yun; China	Li Ning; China	none awarded
1984 Los Angeles	Lou Yun; China	Shinji Morisue; Japan	none awarded
1988 Seoul	Lou Yun; China	Sylvio Kroll; East Germany	Park Jong-hoon; South Korea
1992 Barcelona	Vitaly Scherbo; Unified Team	Grigory Misutin; Unified Team	Yoo Ok-ryul; South Korea
1996 Atlanta	Alexei Nemov; Russia	Yeo Hong-chul; South Korea	Vitaly Scherbo; Belarus
2000 Sydney	Gervasio Deferr; Spain	Alexei Bondarenko; Russia	Leszek Blanik; Poland
2004 Athens	Gervasio Deferr; Spain	Jevgēņijs Saproņenko; Latvia	Marian Drăgulescu; Romania
2008 Beijing	Leszek Blanik; Poland	Thomas Bouhail; France	Anton Golotsutskov; Russia
2012 London	Yang Hak-seon; South Korea	Denis Ablyazin; Russia	Igor Radivilov; Ukraine
2016 Rio de Janeiro	Ri Se-gwang; North Korea	Denis Ablyazin; Russia	Kenzo Shirai; Japan
2020 Tokyo	Shin Jea-hwan; South Korea	Denis Ablyazin; ROC	Artur Davtyan; Armenia
2024 Paris	Carlos Yulo; Philippines	Artur Davtyan; Armenia	Harry Hepworth; Great Britain
2028 Los Angeles			

==== All-around, mixed team ====
Games	Gold	Silver	Bronze
2028 Los Angeles			

=== Discontinued events ===
==== Club swinging ====
Games	Gold	Silver	Bronze
1904 St. Louis	Edward Hennig; United States	Emil Voigt; United States	Ralph Wilson; United States

==== Combined 4 events ====
Games	Gold	Silver	Bronze
1904 St. Louis	Anton Heida; United States	George Eyser; United States	William Merz; United States

==== Free system, team ====
Games	Gold	Silver	Bronze
1912 Stockholm	Norway; Isak Abrahamsen; Hans Beyer; Hartmann Bjørnsen; Alfred Engelsen; Bjarne Johnsen; Sigurd Jørgensen; Knud Leonard Knudsen; Alf Lie; Rolf Lie; Tor Lund; Petter Martinsen; Per Mathiesen; Jacob Opdahl; Nils Opdahl; Bjarne Pettersen; Frithjof Sælen; Øistein Schirmer; Georg Selenius; Sigvard Sivertsen; Robert Sjursen; Einar Strøm; Gabriel Thorstensen; Thomas Thorstensen; Nils Voss	Finland; Kaarlo Ekholm; Eino Forsström; Eero Hyvärinen; Mikko Hyvärinen; Tauno Ilmoniemi; Ilmari Keinänen; Jalmari Kivenheimo; Karl Lund; Aarne Pelkonen; Ilmari Pernaja; Arvid Rydman; Eino Saastamoinen; Aarne Salovaara; Heikki Sammallahti; Hannes Sirola; Klaus Suomela; Lauri Tanner; Väinö Tiiri; Kaarlo Vähämäki; Kaarlo Vasama	Denmark; Axel Andersen; Hjalmart Andersen; Halvor Birch; Wilhelm Grimmelmann; Arvor Hansen; Christian Hansen; Marius Hansen; Charles Jensen; Hjalmar Peter Johansen; Poul Jørgensen; Carl Krebs; Vigo Madsen; Lukas Nielsen; Rikard Nordstrøm; Steen Olsen; Oluf Olsson; Carl Pedersen; Oluf Pedersen; Niels Petersen; Christian Svendsen
1920 Antwerp	Denmark; Georg Albertsen; Rudolf Andersen; Viggo Dibbern; Aage Frandsen; Hugo Helsten; Harry Holm; Herold Jansson; Robert Johnsen; Christian Juhl; Vilhelm Lange; Svend Madsen; Peder Marcussen; Peder Møller; Niels Turin Nielsen; Steen Olsen; Christian Pedersen; Hans Rønne; Harry Sørensen; Christian Thomas; Knud Vermehren	Norway; Alf Aanning; Karl Aas; Jørgen Andersen; Gustav Bayer; Jørgen Bjørnstad; Asbjørn Bodahl; Eilert Bøhm; Trygve Bøyesen; Ingolf Davidsen; Håkon Endreson; Jacob Erstad; Harald Færstad; Hermann Helgesen; Petter Hol; Otto Johannessen; John Anker Johansen; Torbjørn Kristoffersen; Henrik Nielsen; Jacob Opdahl; Arthur Rydstrøm; Frithjof Sælen; Bjørn Skjærpe; Wilhelm Steffensen; Olav Sundal; Reidar Tønsberg; Lauritz Wigand-Larsen	none awarded

==== Horizontal bar, team ====
Games	Gold	Silver	Bronze
1896 Athens	Germany; Konrad Böcker; Alfred Flatow; Gustav Flatow; Georg Hilmar; Fritz Hofmann; Fritz Manteuffel; Karl Neukirch; Richard Röstel; Gustav Schuft; Carl Schuhmann; Hermann Weingärtner	none awarded	none awarded

==== Indian clubs ====
Games	Gold	Silver	Bronze
1932 Los Angeles	George Roth; United States	Philip Erenberg; United States	William Kuhlemeier; United States

==== Parallel bars, team ====
Games	Gold	Silver	Bronze
1896 Athens	Germany; Konrad Böcker; Alfred Flatow; Gustav Flatow; Georg Hilmar; Fritz Hofmann; Fritz Manteuffel; Karl Neukirch; Richard Röstel; Gustav Schuft; Carl Schuhmann; Hermann Weingärtner	Greece; Nikolaos Andriakopoulos; Spyros Athanasopoulos; Petros Persakis; Thomas Xenakis	Greece; Ioannis Chrysafis; Ioannis Mitropoulos; Dimitrios Loundras; Filippos Karvelas

==== Rope climbing ====
Games	Gold	Silver	Bronze
1896 Athens	Nicolaos Andriakopoulos; Greece	Thomas Xenakis; Greece	Fritz Hofmann; Germany
1900 Paris	not included in the Olympic program		
1904 St. Louis	George Eyser; United States	Charles Krause; United States	Emil Voigt; United States
1908–1920	not included in the Olympic program		
1924 Paris	Bedřich Šupčík; Czechoslovakia	Albert Séguin; France	August Güttinger; Switzerland
1924 Paris	Bedřich Šupčík; Czechoslovakia	Albert Séguin; France	Ladislav Vácha; Czechoslovakia
1928 Amsterdam	not included in the Olympic program		
1932 Los Angeles	Raymond Bass; United States	William Galbraith; United States	Thomas F. Connolly; United States

==== Sidehorse vault ====
Games	Gold	Silver	Bronze
1924 Paris	Albert Séguin; France	François Gangloff; France	none awarded
1924 Paris	Albert Séguin; France	Jean Gounot; France	none awarded

==== Swedish system, team ====
Games	Gold	Silver	Bronze
1912 Stockholm	Sweden; Per Bertilsson; Carl-Ehrenfried Carlberg; Nils Granfelt; Curt Hartzell; Oswald Holmberg; Anders Hylander; Axel Janse; Boo Kullberg; Sven Landberg; Per Nilsson; Benkt Norelius; Axel Norling; Daniel Norling; Sven Rosén; Nils Silfverskiöld; Carl Silfverstrand; John Sörenson; Yngve Stiernspetz; Carl-Erik Svensson; Karl Johan Svensson; Knut Torell; Edward Wennerholm; Claës-Axel Wersäll; David Wiman	Denmark; Peter Andersen; Valdemar Bøggild; Søren Peter Christensen; Ingvald Eriksen; George Falcke; Torkild Garp; Hans Trier Hansen; Johannes Hansen; Rasmus Hansen; Jens Kristian Jensen; Søren Alfred Jensen; Karl Kirk; Jens Kirkegaard; Olaf Kjems; Carl Larsen; Jens Peter Laursen; Marius Lefèrve; Povl Mark; Einar Olsen; Hans Pedersen; Hans Eiler Pedersen; Olaf Pedersen; Peder Larsen Pedersen; Aksel Sørensen; Martin Thau; Søren Thorborg; Kristen Vadgaard; Johannes Vinther	Norway; Arthur Amundsen; Jørgen Andersen; Trygve Bøyesen; Georg Brustad; Conrad Christensen; Oscar Engelstad; Marius Eriksen; Axel Henry Hansen; Petter Hol; Eugen Ingebretsen; Olaf Ingebretsen; Olof Jacobsen; Erling Jensen; Thor Jensen; Frithjof Olsen; Oscar Olstad; Edvin Paulsen; Carl Alfred Pedersen; Paul Pedersen; Rolf Robach; Sigurd Smebye; Torleif Torkildsen
1920 Antwerp	Sweden; Fausto Acke; Albert Andersson; Arvid Andersson-Holtman; Helge Bäckander; Bengt Bengtsson; Fabian Biörck; Erik Charpentier; Sture Ericsson-Ewréus; Konrad Granström; Helge Gustafsson; Åke Häger; Ture Hedman; Sven Johnson; Sven-Olof Jonsson; Karl Lindahl; Edmund Lindmark; Bengt Mohrberg; Frans Persson; Klas Särner; Curt Sjöberg; Gunnar Söderlindh; John Sörenson; Erik Svensén; Gösta Törner	Denmark; Johannes Birk; Frede Hansen; Frederik Hansen; Kristian Hansen; Hans Jakobsen; Aage Jørgensen; Alfred Frøkjær Jørgensen; Alfred Ollerup Jørgensen; Arne Jørgensen; Knud Kirkeløkke; Jens Lambæk; Kristian Larsen; Kristian Madsen; Niels Erik Nielsen; Niels Kristian Nielsen; Dynes Pedersen; Hans Pedersen; Johannes Pedersen; Peter Dorf Pedersen; Rasmus Rasmussen; Hans Christian Sørensen; Hans Laurids Sørensen; Søren Sørensen; Georg Vest; Aage Walther	Belgium; Paul Arets; Léon Bronckaert; Léopold Clabots; Jean-Baptiste Claessens; Léon Darrien; Lucien Dehoux; Ernest Deleu; Émile Duboisson; Ernest Dureuil; Joseph Fiems; Marcel Hansen; Louis Henin; Omer Hoffman; Félix Logiest; Charles Maerschalck; René Paenhuijsen; Arnold Pierrot; René Pinchart; Gaspard Pirotte; Augustien Pluys; Léopold Son; Édouard Taeymans; Pierre Thiriar; Henri Verhavert

==== Triathlon ====
Games	Gold	Silver	Bronze
1904 St. Louis	Adolf Spinnler (SUI); Germany	Julius Lenhart (AUT); United States	Wilhelm Weber; Germany

==== Tumbling ====
Games	Gold	Silver	Bronze
1932 Los Angeles	Rowland Wolfe; United States	Ed Gross; United States	William Herrmann; United States

== Trampoline ==
=== Individual ===
Games	Gold	Silver	Bronze
2000 Sydney	Alexander Moskalenko; Russia	Ji Wallace; Australia	Mathieu Turgeon; Canada
2004 Athens	Yuri Nikitin; Ukraine	Alexander Moskalenko; Russia	Henrik Stehlik; Germany
2008 Beijing	Lu Chunlong; China	Jason Burnett; Canada	Dong Dong; China
2012 London	Dong Dong; China	Dmitry Ushakov; Russia	Lu Chunlong; China
2016 Rio de Janeiro	Uladzislau Hancharou; Belarus	Dong Dong; China	Gao Lei; China
2020 Tokyo	Ivan Litvinovich; Belarus	Dong Dong; China	Dylan Schmidt; New Zealand
2024 Paris	Ivan Litvinovich; Individual Neutral Athletes	Wang Zisai; China	Yan Langyu; China
2028 Los Angeles			

== See also ==
- Gymnastics at the 1906 Intercalated Games — these Intercalated Games are no longer regarded as official Games by the International Olympic Committee
- List of Asian Games medalists in gymnastics
- List of top Olympic gymnastics medalists

== Notes ==
Main notes

Subnotes
