= Hyvärinen =

Hyvärinen is a Finnish surname. Notable people with the surname include:

- Aapo Hyvärinen (born 1970), Finnish computer scientist
- Annemari Sandell-Hyvärinen (born 1977), Finnish long-distance runner
- Antti Hyvärinen (1932–2000), Finnish ski jumper
- Eero Hyvärinen (1890–1973), Finnish gymnast
- Mikko Hyvärinen (1889–1973), Finnish gymnast
- Pasi Hyvärinen (born 1987), Finnish volleyball player
- Perttu Hyvärinen (born 1991), Finnish cross-country skier
- Toni Hyvärinen (born 1988), Finnish ice hockey player
