= Opdahl =

Opdahl is a Norwegian surname that derives from Old Norse Uppdalr (uppi; "up" and dale;"valley"). Notable people with the surname include:

- Andreas Lothe Opdahl (born 1964), Norwegian computer scientist and professor of Information Systems Development
- Iren Opdahl (born 1974), Norwegian politician
- Jacob Opdahl (1894–1938), Norwegian Olympic gymnast
- Nils Opdahl (1882–1951 ), Norwegian Olympic gymnast
- Ørnulf Opdahl, (born 1944), Norwegian painter and educator
- Einar Opdahl, resident of Entwistle, Alberta who found a diamond in the Pembina River
- Johannes Opdahl, Norwegian carver who worked at the Nidaros Cathedral West Front
