= Sjursen =

Sjursen is a surname. Notable people with the surname include:

- Jann Sjursen (born 1963), Danish teacher and politician
- Robert Sjursen (1891–1965), Norwegian gymnast
- Amund Høie Sjursen (born 1996), Norwegian athletics competitor
- Egil Herman Sjursen, Norwegian politician and economist
