= Christina Pedersen =

Christina Pedersen may refer to:

- Christina Pedersen (handballer, born 1982), Danish handballer
- Christina Pedersen (handballer, born 2001), Danish handballer
- Christina Pedersen (referee) (born 1981), Norwegian football referee

== See also ==
- Christinna Pedersen (born 1986), Danish badminton player
- Christina Petersen (born 1974), Danish footballer
- Christian Pedersen (disambiguation)
