= Keinonen =

Keinonen is a Finnish surname. Notable people with the surname include:

- Matti Keinonen (1941–2021), Finnish ice hockey player and coach
- Yrjö Keinonen (1912–1977), Finnish general

== See also ==
- Keinänen
