= Émile Knepper =

Luxembourgish gymnast (1892–1978)

- Full name: Émile Nicolas Knepper
- Born: 26 August 1892 Bettembourg, Luxembourg
- Died: 24 September 1978 (aged 86) Luxembourg City, Luxembourg

Gymnastics career
- Discipline: Men's artistic gymnastics
- Country represented: Luxembourg

Émile Nicolas Knepper (26 August 1892 – 24 September 1978) was a Luxembourgish gymnast who competed in the 1912 Summer Olympics. He was born in Bettembourg. In 1912, he was a member of the Luxembourgish team, which finished fifth in the team, free system event.
