= Hans Meulengracht-Madsen =

Danish sailor

Personal information
- Nationality: Danish
- Born: 9 September 1885 Vejle, Denmark
- Died: 7 October 1966 (aged 81) Gentofte, Denmark

Sailing career
- Sport: Sailing
- Club: Royal Danish Yacht Club
- Class: 6 Metre
Medal record
Men's sailing
Representing Denmark
Olympic Games
Silver medal – second place	1912 Stockholm	6 metre class

Hans Meulengracht-Madsen (9 September 1885 – 7 October 1966) was a Danish sailor who competed in the 1912 Summer Olympics. He was team member on the Danish boat Nurdug II, which won the silver medal in the 6 metre class.

His brothers, Svend Madsen and Vigo Madsen, were also Olympic competitors in gymnatics.
