= Johannes Reuschle =

German gymnast

- Full name: Hermann Franz Johannes Reuschle
- Born: 23 June 1890 Schönefeld, German Empire
- Died: 31 July 1949 (aged 59)

Gymnastics career
- Discipline: Men's artistic gymnastics
- Country represented: Germany
- Gym: Allgemeiner Akademischer Turnerbund Leipzig

Hermann Franz Johannes Reuschle (June 23, 1890 – July 31, 1949) was a German gymnast who competed in the 1912 Summer Olympics. He was born in Schönfeld, Saxony. In 1912, he was a member of the German team, which finished fourth in the team, free system competition and fifth in the team, European system event.
