= Olav Sundal =

Norwegian artistic gymnast

- Full name: Olav Johan Sundal
- Born: 8 August 1899 Fana Municipality, United Kingdoms of Sweden and Norway
- Died: 21 January 1978 (aged 78) Bergen Municipality, Norway

Gymnastics career
- Discipline: Men's artistic gymnastics
- Country represented: Norway
- Gym: Bergens TF
Medal record
Men's artistic gymnastics
Representing Norway
Olympic Games
Silver medal – second place	1920 Antwerp	Team, free system

Olav Johan Sundal (8 August 1899 – 21 January 1978) was a Norwegian gymnast who competed in the 1920 Summer Olympics. He was part of the Norwegian team, which won the gold medal in the gymnastics men's team, free system event. His interment was at Vestre gravlund in Oslo, Norway.
