= Johan Stumpf =

Norwegian artistic gymnast

- Full name: Johan Leopold Stumpf
- Born: 26 May 1880 Kristiansand, United Kingdoms of Sweden and Norway
- Died: 24 August 1944 (aged 64) Texas, US
- Height: 1.73 m (5 ft 8 in)

Gymnastics career
- Discipline: Men's artistic gymnastics
- Country represented: Norway
- Gym: Kristiansands TF
Medal record
Men's artistic gymnastics
Representing Norway
Intercalated Games
Gold medal – first place	1906 Athens	Team

Johan Leopold Stumpf (19 May 1880 – 24 August 1944) was a Norwegian gymnast who competed in the 1906 Summer Olympics. in Athens, Greece.

Johan Leopold Stumpf was born at Kristiansand in Vest-Agder, Norway. He was the son of Ladislav Leopold Stumpf (1856–1944) and Amalie Gudine Olausdatter (1851–1927). He competed as a member of the Kristiansands Turnforening gymnastics club. In 1906, he won the gold medal as a member of the Norwegian gymnastics team in the Gymnastics Team Combined Exercises at the Intercalated Olympic Games. He later emigrated to Texas.
