= Christian Pedersen =

Christian or Kristian Pedersen may refer to:

- Kristian Pedersen (born 1994), Danish footballer
- Christian Pedersen (cyclist) (1920–1999), Danish cyclist
- Christian Pedersen (gymnast) (1889–1953), Danish Olympic gymnast
- Christian Pedersen (rower) (born 1982), Danish rower and member of the Gold Four
- Christian Pedersen (sport shooter) (1874–1957), Danish Olympic sports shooter
- Christian Theodore Pedersen (1876–1969), Norwegian-American seaman, whaling captain and fur trader
- Kristian Pedersen (gymnast) (1878–1917), Danish Olympic gymnast
- Kristian Tønder (Kristian Pedersen Tønder, 1860–1934), Norwegian priest and politician
