= Jean-Pierre Frantzen =

Luxembourgish gymnast (1890–1957)

- Born: 9 May 1890 Luxembourg City, Luxembourg
- Died: 23 November 1957 (aged 67) Luxembourg City, Luxembourg

Gymnastics career
- Discipline: Men's artistic gymnastics
- Country represented: Luxembourg

Jean-Pierre Frantzen (9 May 1890 – 23 November 1957) was a Luxembourgish gymnast who competed in the 1912 Summer Olympics. He was born in Luxembourg City. In 1912, he was a member of the Luxembourgish team, which finished fifth in the team, free system event.
