= Hans Roth (gymnast) =

German gymnast

- Born: 17 March 1890 Floridsdorf, Austria-Hungary

Gymnastics career
- Discipline: Men's artistic gymnastics
- Country represented: Germany
- Gym: Allgemeiner Akademischer Turnerbund Leipzig

Hans Roth (born March 17, 1890, date of death unknown) was a German gymnast who competed in the 1912 Summer Olympics. He was born in Floridsdorf, Austria. In 1912, he was a member of the German team that finished fourth in the team, free system competition and fifth in the team, European system event.
