= Alf Lie =

Norwegian artistic gymnast

- Born: 10 April 1887 Bergen, United Kingdoms of Sweden and Norway
- Died: 22 March 1969 (aged 81) Bergen, Norway
- Relatives: Rolf Lie (brother)

Gymnastics career
- Discipline: Men's artistic gymnastics
- Country represented: Norway
- Gym: Bergens TF
Medal record
Men's artistic gymnastics
Representing Norway
Olympic Games
Gold medal – first place	1912 Stockholm	Team, free system

Alf Lie (10 April 1887 – 22 March 1969) was a Norwegian gymnast who competed in the 1912 Summer Olympics. He was part of the Norwegian team, which won the gold medal in the gymnastics men's team, free system event.
