= Thomas Thorstensen =

Norwegian artistic gymnast

- Born: 15 May 1880 Stavanger, United Kingdoms of Sweden and Norway
- Died: 18 June 1953 (aged 73)
- Relatives: Gabriel Thorstensen (brother)

Gymnastics career
- Discipline: Men's artistic gymnastics
- Country represented: Norway
- Gym: Bergens TF
Medal record
Men's artistic gymnastics
Representing Norway
Olympic Games
Gold medal – first place	1912 Stockholm	Team, free system
Silver medal – second place	1908 London	Team

Thomas Thorstensen (18 May 1880 – 18 June 1953) was a Norwegian gymnast who competed in the 1908 Summer Olympics and in the 1912 Summer Olympics.

As a member of the Norwegian team, he won a silver medal in the gymnastics team event in 1908. Four years later, the Norwegian team, of which he was still part, won the gold medal in the gymnastics men's team, free system event.
