= Per Mathiesen =

Norwegian artistic gymnast

- Full name: Per Anton Mathiesen
- Born: 11 March 1885 Kragerø, United Kingdoms of Sweden and Norway
- Died: 2 June 1961 (aged 76) Sarpsborg, Norway

Gymnastics career
- Discipline: Men's artistic gymnastics
- Country represented: Norway
- Gym: Bergens TF
Medal record
Men's artistic gymnastics
Representing Norway
Olympic Games
Gold medal – first place	1912 Stockholm	Team, free system

Per Anton Mathiesen (11 March 1885 – 2 June 1961) was a Norwegian gymnast who competed in the 1912 Summer Olympics. He was part of the Norwegian team, which won the gold medal in the gymnastics men's team, free system event.
