= Rolf Lie =

Norwegian artistic gymnast

- Born: 20 May 1889 Bergen, United Kingdoms of Sweden and Norway
- Died: 18 June 1959 (aged 70) Tønsberg, Norway
- Relatives: Alf Lie (brother)

Gymnastics career
- Discipline: Men's artistic gymnastics
- Country represented: Norway
- Gym: Bergens TF
Medal record
Men's artistic gymnastics
Representing Norway
Olympic Games
Gold medal – first place	1912 Stockholm	Team, free system

Rolf Lie (20 May 1889 - 18 June 1959) was a Norwegian gymnast who competed in the 1912 Summer Olympics. He was part of the Norwegian team, which won the gold medal in the gymnastics men's team, free system event.
