= Keinänen =

Keinänen is a Finnish surname. Notable people with the surname include:

- Ilmari Keinänen (1887–1934), Finnish gymnast
- Sami Keinänen (born 1973), Finnish bass player
- Titta Keinänen, Finnish karateka
