= Kristiansands TF =

Norwegian gymnastics club

Logo.

Kristiansands Turnforening is a Norwegian gymnastics club from Kristiansand, founded on 17 October 1858.

Two Olympic gymnasts have represented the club: 1906 gold medalist Johan Stumpf and 1912 gold medalist Øistein Schirmer.
