= Maurice Palgen =

Luxembourgish artistic gymnast (1893–1951)

- Born: 13 May 1893 Luxembourg City, Luxembourg
- Died: 23 February 1951 (aged 57) Luxembourg City, Luxembourg

Gymnastics career
- Discipline: Men's artistic gymnastics
- Country represented: Luxembourg

Maurice Palgen (13 May 1893 – 23 February 1951) was a Luxembourgish gymnast who competed in the 1912 Summer Olympics. He was born in Luxembourg City. In 1912, he was a member of the Luxembourgish team, which finished fifth in the team, free system event.
