= Otto Johannessen =

Norwegian artistic gymnast

- Full name: Otto Olavus Johannessen
- Born: 25 July 1894 Bergen, United Kingdoms of Sweden and Norway
- Died: 6 December 1962 (aged 68) New York City, New York, US

Gymnastics career
- Discipline: Men's artistic gymnastics
- Country represented: Norway
- Gym: Bergens TF
Medal record
Men's artistic gymnastics
Representing Norway
Olympic Games
Silver medal – second place	1920 Antwerp	Team, free system

Otto Olavus Johannessen (25 July 1894 - 6 December 1962) was a Norwegian gymnast who competed in the 1920 Summer Olympics.

He was part of the Norwegian team which won the silver medal in the gymnastics men's team, free system event. His affiliation was with Bergens TF. He died in New York City.
