= Axel Andersen =

Danish gymnast

- Full name: Axel Sigurd Andersen
- Born: 20 December 1891 Copenhagen, Denmark
- Died: 15 May 1931 (aged 39) Copenhagen, Denmark

Gymnastics career
- Discipline: Men's artistic gymnastics
- Country represented: Denmark
Medal record
Men's artistic gymnastics
Representing Denmark
Olympic Games
| Bronze medal – third place | 1912 Stockholm | Team, free system |

Axel Sigurd Andersen (20 December 1891 – 15 May 1931) was a Danish gymnast who competed in the 1912 Summer Olympics. He was part of the Danish team, which won the bronze medal in the gymnastics men's team, free system event. In the individual all-around competition, he finished 33rd. He was born and died in Copenhagen.
