= Heikki Sammallahti =

Finnish artistic gymnast

- Full name: Heikki Albert Sammallahti
- Born: 20 January 1886 Pyhäjärvi, Grand Duchy of Finland, Russian Empire
- Died: 17 October 1954 (aged 68) Kokkola, Finland

Gymnastics career
- Discipline: Men's artistic gymnastics
- Country represented: Finland
Medal record
Men's artistic gymnastics
Representing Finland
Olympic Games
Silver medal – second place	1912 Stockholm	Team, free system

Heikki Albert Sammallahti (January 20, 1886 – October 17, 1954) was a Finnish gymnast who competed in the 1912 Summer Olympics. He was part of the Finnish team, which won the silver medal in the gymnastics men's team, free system event.
