= Karl Lund =

Finnish artistic gymnast (1888–1942)

- Full name: Karl Fredrik Leonard Lund
- Born: 31 July 1888 Helsinki, Grand Duchy of Finland, Russian Empire
- Died: 11 December 1942 (aged 54) Helsinki, Finland

Gymnastics career
- Discipline: Men's artistic gymnastics
- Country represented: Finland
Medal record
Men's artistic gymnastics
Representing Finland
Olympic Games
| Silver medal – second place | 1912 Stockholm | Team, free system |

Karl Fredrik Leonard Lund (July 31, 1888 – December 11, 1942) was a Finnish gymnast who competed in the 1912 Summer Olympics. He was part of the Finnish team, which won the silver medal in the gymnastics men's team, free system event.
