= Svend Madsen =

Danish artistic gymnast (1897–1990)

- Full name: Svend Meulengracht Madsen
- Born: 17 March 1897 Vejle, Denmark
- Died: 10 September 1990 (aged 93) Gentofte, Denmark
- Relatives: Hans Meulengracht-Madsen (brother); Vigo Madsen (brother)

Gymnastics career
- Discipline: Men's artistic gymnastics
- Country represented: Denmark
Medal record
Men's artistic gymnastics
Representing Denmark
Olympic Games
Gold medal – first place	1920 Antwerp	Team, free system

Svend Meulengracht Madsen (17 March 1897 in Vejle, Denmark – 10 September 1990 in Gentofte, Denmark) was a Danish gymnast who competed in the 1920 Summer Olympics. He was part of the Danish team, which was able to win the gold medal in the gymnastics men's team, free system event in 1920.

His brothers, Hans Meulengracht-Madsen and Vigo Madsen, were also Olympic competitors, in sailing and gymnatics, respectively.
