= Jacob Erstad =

Norwegian gymnast (1898–1963)

- Born: 12 January 1898
- Died: 1 December 1963 (aged 65)

Gymnastics career
- Discipline: Men's artistic gymnastics
- Country represented: Norway
- Club: Bergens TF
Medal record
Olympic Games
Silver medal – second place	1920 Antwerp	Team, free system

Jacob Erstad (12 January 1898 – 1 December 1963) was a Norwegian gymnast who competed in the 1920 Summer Olympics. He was part of the Norwegian team, which won the silver medal in the gymnastics men's team, free system event. He was born and died in Bergen, and represented Bergens TF.
