= Charles Jensen (gymnast) =

Danish gymnast (1885–1920)

- Full name: Charles Kristoffer Peter Jensen
- Born: 24 December 1885 Bislev, Denmark
- Died: 5 June 1920 (aged 34) Roskilde, Denmark

Gymnastics career
- Discipline: Men's artistic gymnastics
- Country represented: Denmark
Medal record
Men's artistic gymnastics
Representing Denmark
Olympic Games
Bronze medal – third place	1912 Stockholm	Team, free system

Charles Kristoffer Peter Jensen (24 December 1885 – 5 June 1920) was a Danish gymnast who competed in the 1908 Summer Olympics and in the 1912 Summer Olympics.

He was part of the Danish team, which finished fourth in the gymnastics team event in 1908. Four years later he won the bronze medal in the gymnastics men's team, free system event. In the individual all-around competition he finished thirtieth.
