= Aarne Salovaara =

Finnish gymnast

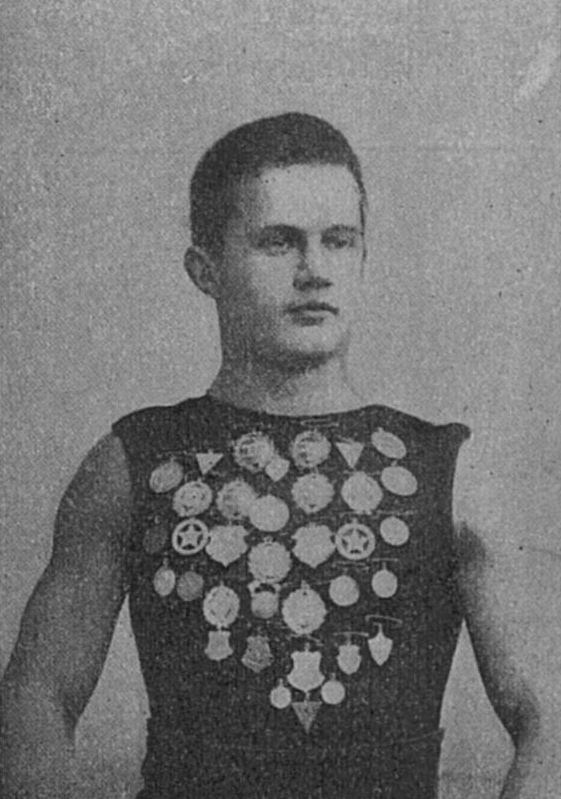
- Salovaara c. 1904

Personal information
- Full name: Arne Ihamo Salovaara
- Alternative name: Arne Ihamo Nylenius
- Born: 25 February 1887 Kotka, Grand Duchy of Finland, Russian Empire
- Died: 11 September 1945 (aged 58) Kotka, Finland

Gymnastics career
- Discipline: Men's artistic gymnastics
- Country represented: Finland
- Club: Kotkan Into
Medal record
Men's artistic gymnastics
Representing Finland
Olympic Games
Silver medal – second place	1912 Stockholm	Team, free system
Bronze medal – third place	1908 London	Team

Arne Ihamo "Aarne" Salovaara (born Arne Ihamo Nylenius, 25 February 1887 – 11 September 1945) was a Finnish gymnast and athlete who won two Olympic medals and two Finnish championships.

== Early life and education ==
Salovaara was born Arne Ihamo Nylenius on 25 February 1887. He Finnicized his name from Nylenius to Salovaara on 12 May 1906. He took part in a Fennoman protest in 1908 and was relegated from his university for one term. He was a board member of the Student Union of the University of Helsinki in 1913–1914.

== Athletic career ==
He won the Finnish national championships in a combined sports competition Urheilukuninkuuskilpailut in 1904 and 1906.

=== Olympic Games ===
Aarne Salovaara at the Olympic Games
Games	Sport	Event	Rank	Result	Notes
1908 Summer Olympics	Gymnastics	Team	3rd	405 points	Source:
1908 Summer Olympics	Athletics	Discus throw	12th–42nd	unknown	Source:
1908 Summer Olympics	Athletics	Javelin throw	4th	45.89 metres	Source:
1908 Summer Olympics	Athletics	Freestyle javelin throw	10th–33rd	unknown	Source:
1908 Summer Olympics	Athletics	Shot put	Did not start		
1908 Summer Olympics	Athletics	Greek discus throw	Did not start		
1912 Summer Olympics	Gymnastics	Team, free system	2nd	109.25 points	
1912 Summer Olympics	Athletics	Pentathlon	Did not start		

Salovaara was a district secretary in the Finnish gymnastics and sport federation SVUL in 1906–1907, a district chairman in 1910–1911, and a member of the board of SVUL in 1913 and 1926. He was the chairman of the club Kotkan Into intermittently in 1915–1927.

== Post-athletics career ==
Salovaara was the councillor of the municipal court in Kotka from 1915–1945. He was active in the Kotka White Guard, where he reached the rank of vääpeli.
