= Vigo Madsen =

Danish gymnast

- Full name: Vigo Meulengracht Madsen
- Born: 13 November 1889 Vejle, Denmark
- Died: 17 June 1979 (aged 89) Helleruplund, Denmark
- Relatives: Hans Meulengracht-Madsen (brother); Svend Madsen (brother)

Gymnastics career
- Discipline: Men's artistic gymnastics
- Country represented: Denmark
Medal record
Men's artistic gymnastics
Representing Denmark
Olympic Games
Bronze medal – third place	1912 Stockholm	Team, free system

Vigo Meulengracht Madsen (13 November 1889 in Vejle, Denmark – 17 June 1979 in Helleruplund, Denmark) was a Danish gymnast who competed in the 1908 Summer Olympics and in the 1912 Summer Olympics.

He was part of the Danish team, which finished fourth in the gymnastics team event in 1908. Four years later, he won the bronze medal in the gymnastics men's team free system event.

His brothers, Hans Meulengracht-Madsen and Svend Madsen, were also Olympic competitors, in sailing and gymnatics, respectively.
