= Kaarlo Ekholm =

Finnish artistic gymnast

- Born: 7 December 1884
- Died: 13 May 1946 (aged 61)

Gymnastics career
- Discipline: Men's artistic gymnastics
- Country represented: Finland
Medal record
Olympic Games
Silver medal – second place	1912 Stockholm	Team, free system

Kaarlo Väinö "Kalle" Ekholm (7 December 1884 – 13 May 1946) was a Finnish gymnast who competed in the 1912 Summer Olympics.

He was part of the Finnish team that won the silver medal in the gymnastics men's team free system event.
