= Sigurd Jørgensen =

Norwegian gymnast

- Full name: Sigurd Gersdorf Jørgensen
- Born: 15 December 1887 Bergen, United Kingdoms of Sweden and Norway
- Died: 14 December 1929 (aged 41) Bergen, Norway

Gymnastics career
- Discipline: Men's artistic gymnastics
- Country represented: Norway
- Gym: Bergens TF
Medal record
Men's artistic gymnastics
Representing Norway
Olympic Games
Gold medal – first place	1912 Stockholm	Team, free system

Sigurd Gersdorf Jørgensen (15 February 1887 - 14 December 1929) was a Norwegian gymnast who competed in the 1912 Summer Olympics.

He was part of the Norwegian team, which won the gold medal in the gymnastics men's team, free system event. He was born and died in Bergen, and represented Bergens TF.
