= Bjarne Pettersen (gymnast) =

Norwegian gymnast (1891–1983)

- Full name: Bjarne Viktor Pettersen
- Born: 8 June 1891 Kristiania, United Kingdoms of Sweden and Norway
- Died: 14 December 1983 (aged 92) Porsgrunn, Norway

Gymnastics career
- Discipline: Men's artistic gymnastics
- Country represented: Norway
- Club: Idrettsforeningen Urædd
Medal record
Men's artistic gymnastics
Representing Norway
Olympic Games
Gold medal – first place	1912 Stockholm	Team, free system

Bjarne Viktor Pettersen (8 June 1891 – 14 December 1983) was a Norwegian gymnast who competed in the 1912 Summer Olympics. He was part of the Norwegian team, which won the gold medal in the gymnastics men's team, free system event.
