= Wilhelm Grimmelmann =

Danish gymnast (1893–1958)

- Full name: Herman Johan Wilhelm Grimmelmann
- Born: 15 January 1893 Asendorf, Denmark
- Died: 8 December 1958 (aged 65) West Haven, Connecticut, US

Gymnastics career
- Discipline: Men's artistic gymnastics
- Country represented: Denmark
Medal record
Men's artistic gymnastics
Representing Denmark
Olympic Games
| Bronze medal – third place | 1912 Stockholm | Team, free system |

Herman Johan Wilhelm Grimmelmann (15 January 1893 – 8 December 1959) was a Danish gymnast who competed in the 1912 Summer Olympics. He was part of the Danish team, which won the bronze medal in the gymnastics men's team, free system event in 1912.
