= Øistein Schirmer =

Norwegian artistic gymnast

- Born: 11 April 1879 Fredrikstad, United Kingdoms of Sweden and Norway
- Died: 24 May 1947 (aged 68) Larvik, Norway

Gymnastics career
- Discipline: Men's artistic gymnastics
- Country represented: Norway
- Gym: Kristiansands TF
Medal record
Men's artistic gymnastics
Representing Norway
Olympic Games
| Gold medal – first place | 1912 Stockholm | Team, free system |

Øistein Schirmer (11 April 1879 – 24 May 1947) was a Norwegian gymnast who competed in the 1912 Summer Olympics.

He was part of the Norwegian team, which won the gold medal in the gymnastics men's team, free system event. He was born in Fredrikstad and died in Larvik, but represented the club Kristiansands TF.
