= Knud Leonard Knudsen =

Norwegian artistic gymnast

- Born: 6 September 1879 Ålesund, United Kingdoms of Sweden and Norway
- Died: 28 April 1954 (aged 74) Bergen, Norway

Gymnastics career
- Discipline: Men's artistic gymnastics
- Country represented: Norway
- Gym: Bergens TF
Medal record
Men's artistic gymnastics
Representing Norway
Olympic Games
Gold medal – first place	1912 Stockholm	Team, free system

Knud Leonard Knudsen (6 September 1879 in Ålesund – 28 April 1954 in Bergen) was a Norwegian gymnast who competed in the 1912 Summer Olympics. He was part of the Norwegian team that won the gold medal in the free system event. He also represented Bergens TF.
