= Kaarlo Vasama =

Finnish gymnast

- Full name: Kaarlo Hjalmar Vasama
- Born: 20 November 1885 Tampere, Grand Duchy of Finland, Russian Empire
- Died: 12 November 1926 (aged 40) Tampere, Finland

Gymnastics career
- Discipline: Men's artistic gymnastics
- Country represented: Finland
Medal record
Men's artistic gymnastics
Representing Finland
Olympic Games
Silver medal – second place	1912 Stockholm	Team, free system

Kaarlo Hjalmar Vasama (20 November 1885 – 12 November 1926) was a Finnish gymnast who competed in the 1912 Summer Olympics. He was part of the Finnish team, which won the silver medal in the gymnastics men's team, free system event.
