= Hartmann Bjørnsen =

Norwegian gymnast (1889–1974)

Hartmann Bjørnson
- Full name: Alfred Hartmann Bjørnson
- Born: 2 February 1889 Stavanger, United Kingdoms of Sweden and Norway
- Died: 25 September 1974 (aged 85) Stavanger, Norway

Gymnastics career
- Discipline: Men's artistic gymnastics
- Country represented: Norway
- Club: Stavanger IF
Medal record
Men's artistic gymnastics
Representing Norway
Olympic Games
Gold medal – first place	1912 Stockholm	Team, free system

Alfred Hartmann Bjørnson (2 February 1889 – 25 September 1974) was a Norwegian gymnast who competed in the 1912 Summer Olympics. He was part of the Norwegian team, which won the gold medal in the gymnastics men's team, free system event.
