= Bjarne Johnsen =

Norwegian gymnast (1892–1984)

- Born: 27 April 1892 Bergen, United Kingdoms of Sweden and Norway
- Died: 4 September 1984 (aged 92) Bergen, Norway

Gymnastics career
- Discipline: Men's artistic gymnastics
- Country represented: Norway
- Gym: Bergens TF
Medal record
Men's artistic gymnastics
Representing Norway
Olympic Games
Gold medal – first place	1912 Stockholm	Team, free system

Bjarne Johnsen (27 April 1892 – 4 September 1984) was a Norwegian gymnast who competed in the 1912 Summer Olympics.

He was part of the Norwegian team, which won the gold medal in the gymnastics men's team, free system event. He was born and died in Bergen, and represented Bergens TF.
