= Gymnastics at the 1912 Summer Olympics – Men's team, free system =

Men's free system team gymnastics at the Games of the V Olympiad
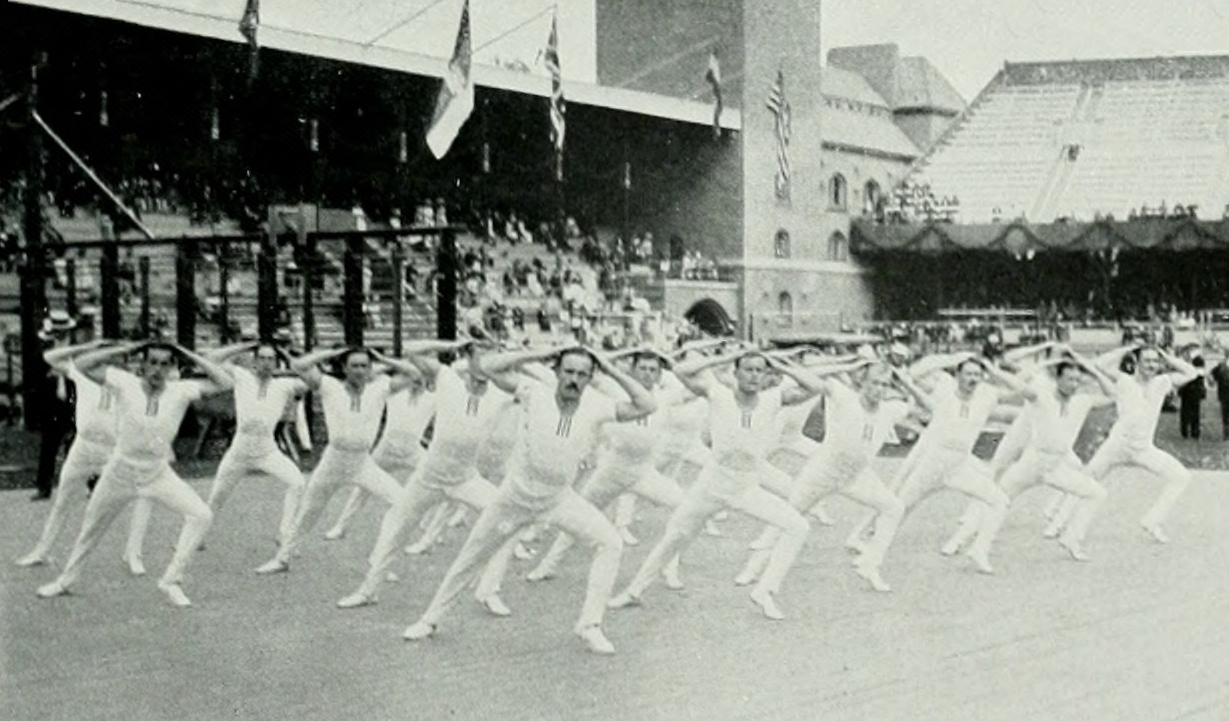
- The gold winning team of Norway.
- Venue: Stockholm Olympic Stadium
- Date: July 10, 1912
- Competitors: 101 from 5 nations

Medalists
1st place, gold medalist(s)		Norway
2nd place, silver medalist(s)		Finland
3rd place, bronze medalist(s)		Denmark

The men's team competition with a free system was an artistic gymnastics event held as part of the Gymnastics at the 1912 Summer Olympics programme. It was one of three team gymnastics events. The others were a team competition in the Swedish system and a standard team competition.

It was the first appearance of the event, which would only be held again at the 1920 Summer Olympics. The official name was Team Competition III – with free choice of movements and apparatus. For every nation one team was allowed to participate. One team had to consist of not less than 16 nor more than 40 members. The entry was closed on June 6, 1912. As all other gymnastics competitions the event took place in the Olympiastadion.

The competition was held on Wednesday July 10, 1912, in the time from 9:30 a.m. to 12:30 p.m. and from 2:00 p.m. to 4:00 p.m.

== Starting order ==
No.	Team	Time	Team Leader	Outfit
1	Germany	9:30 – 10:30	Hermann Kuhr	White jersey with broad, vertical, red field on breast and back; white trousers; yellow shoes.
2	Norway	10:30 – 11:30	Johannes Dahl	White gymnastic jersey with short sleeves; white trousers; white belt; white shoes.
3	Denmark	11:30 – 12:30	H. Mølgaard	White jersey with short sleeves; white trousers; white belt; white shoes.
4	Finland	2:00 – 3:00	Arvid Vartia	White jersey with short sleeves; white trousers; black belt; white shoes.
5	Luxembourg	3:00 – 4:00	Valentin Peffer	White jersey, with sleeves reaching to elbows; black stockinet pantaloons with white facings.

== Results ==
=== Judges ===
Chief Leader: Einar Nerman

No.	Judge	Country
1	J. F. Allum	NOR
2	Abraham Clod-Hansen	DEN
3	A. E. Syson	GBR
4	Wagner Hohenlobbese	GER
5	Ivar Wilskman	FIN

Scores are an average of five judges' marks.

=== Score board ===
Place	Nation	(Denmark) Clod-Hansen	(Norway) Allum	Wilskman	(United Kingdom) Syson	(German Empire) Wagner	Total score	Average
1	Norway	20	24	22	23.25	25	114.25	22.85
2	Finland	20	20	23	22.25	24	109.25	21.85
3	Denmark	23	19	21.5	20.75	22	106.25	21.25
4	Germany	18	12	14	16.25	24	84.25	16.85
5	Luxembourg	19	15.5	18	17	12	81.50	16.30

Three judges saw the first place for Norway, while one judge gave the first place to Denmark and one to Finland. Germany was placed behind Luxembourg by four judges and only the German judge gave his compatriots more points than Luxembourg – enough to beat the small neighbour, but not enough to win a medal.

=== Final standings ===
Place	Nation	Score
1	Norway Isak Abrahamsen; Hans Beyer; Hartmann Bjørnsen; Alfred Engelsen; Bjarne Johnsen; Sigurd Jørgensen; Knud Leonard Knudsen; Alf Lie; Rolf Lie; Tor Lund; Petter Martinsen; Per Mathiesen; Jacob Opdahl; Nils Opdahl; Bjarne Pettersen; Frithjof Sælen; Øistein Schirmer; Georg Selenius; Sigvard Sivertsen; Robert Sjursen; Einar Strøm; Gabriel Thorstensen; Thomas Thorstensen; Nils Voss	22.85
2	Finland Kaarlo Ekholm; Eino Forsström; Eero Hyvärinen; Mikko Hyvärinen; Tauno Ilmoniemi; Ilmari Keinänen; Jalmari Kivenheimo; Karl Lund; Aarne Pelkonen; Ilmari Pernaja; Arvid Rydman; Eino Saastamoinen; Aarne Salovaara; Heikki Sammallahti; Hannes Sirola; Klaus Suomela; Lauri Tanner; Väinö Tiiri; Kaarlo Vähämäki; Kaarlo Vasama	21.85
3	Denmark Axel Andersen; Hjalmart Andersen; Halvor Birch; Wilhelm Grimmelmann; Arvor Hansen; Christian Hansen; Marius Hansen; Charles Jensen; Hjalmar Peter Johansen; Poul Jørgensen; Carl Krebs; Vigo Madsen; Lukas Nielsen; Rikard Nordstrøm; Steen Olsen; Oluf Olsson; Carl Pedersen; Oluf Pedersen; Niels Petersen; Christian Svendsen	21.25
4	Germany Wilhelm Brülle; Johannes Buder; Walter Engelmann; Arno Glockauer; Walter Jesinghaus; Karl Jordan; Rudolf Körner; Heinrich Pahner; Kurt Reichenbach; Johannes Reuschle; Carl Richter; Hans Roth; Adolf Seebaß; Eberhard Sorge; Alex Sperling; Alfred Staats; Hans Werner; Martin Worm	16.85
5	Luxembourg Nicolas Adam; Charles Behm; André Bordang; Jean-Pierre Frantzen; Michel Hemmerling; François Hentges; Pierre Hentges; Jean-Baptiste Horn; Nicolas Kanivé; Émile Knepper; Nicolas Kummer; Marcel Langsam; Emile Lanners; Maurice Palgen; Jean-Pierre Thommes; François Wagner; Antoine Wehrer; Ferd Wirtz; Joseph Zuang	16.30

== Sources ==
- The Official Report of the Olympic Games of Stockholm 1912. Stockholm: Wahlström & Widstrand. 1913.
- Wudarski, Pawel (1999). "Wyniki Igrzysk Olimpijskich" (in Polish).
