= Georg Selenius =

Norwegian artistic gymnast

- Born: 18 October 1884 Fredrikstad, United Kingdoms of Sweden and Norway
- Died: 7 May 1924 (aged 39) Fredrikstad, Norway

Gymnastics career
- Discipline: Men's artistic gymnastics
- Country represented: Norway
- Gym: Fredrikstad Turnforening
Medal record
Men's artistic gymnastics
Representing Norway
Olympic Games
Gold medal – first place	1912 Stockholm	Team, free system

Georg Selenius (born 18 October 1884; died 7 May 1924 in Fredrikstad) was a Norwegian gymnast who competed in the 1912 Summer Olympics. He was part of the Norwegian team, which won the gold medal in the gymnastics men's team, free system event.
