= Poul Jørgensen (gymnast) =

Danish gymnast (1892–1973)

- Full name: Poul Preben Jørgensen
- Born: 17 February 1892 Nykøbing Falster, Denmark
- Died: 6 October 1973 (aged 81) Copenhagen, Denmark

Gymnastics career
- Discipline: Men's artistic gymnastics
- Country represented: Denmark
Medal record
Men's artistic gymnastics
Representing Denmark
Olympic Games
Bronze medal – third place	1912 Stockholm	Team, free system

Poul Preben Jørgensen (17 February 1892 in Nykøbing Falster, Denmark – 6 October 1973 in Copenhagen, Denmark) was a Danish gymnast who competed in the 1912 Summer Olympics. He was part of the Danish team, which won the bronze medal in the gymnastics men's team, free system event.
