= Alfred Engelsen =

Norwegian Olympic gymnast

- Full name: Alfred Bertran Engelsen
- Born: 16 January 1893 Bergen, United Kingdoms of Sweden and Norway
- Died: 13 September 1966 (aged 73) Tvedestrand, Norway

Gymnastics career
- Discipline: Men's artistic gymnastics
- Country represented: Norway
- Gym: Norrøna
Medal record
Men's artistic gymnastics
Representing Norway
Olympic Games
Gold medal – first place	1912 Stockholm	Team, free system

Alfred Bertran Engelsen (16 January 1893 – 13 September 1966) was a Norwegian gymnast and diver who competed in the 1912 Summer Olympics. He was born in Bergen and died in Tvedestrand.

Engelsen was part of the Norwegian team, which won the gold medal in the gymnastics men's team, free system event. He also competed in the plain high diving event but was eliminated in the first round.
