= Lauritz Wigand-Larsen =

Norwegian artistic gymnast

- Born: 24 August 1895 Bergen, United Kingdoms of Sweden and Norway
- Died: 4 June 1951 (aged 55) Bergen, Norway

Gymnastics career
- Discipline: Men's artistic gymnastics
- Country represented: Norway
- Gym: Bergens TF
Medal record
Men's artistic gymnastics
Representing Norway
Olympic Games
Silver medal – second place	1920 Antwerp	Team, free system

Lauritz Wigand-Larsen (24 August 1895 – 4 June 1951) was a Norwegian gymnast who competed in the 1920 Summer Olympics. He was part of the Norwegian team, which won the silver medal in the gymnastics men's team, free system event. He was born and died in Bergen, and represented Bergens TF.
