= Sigvard Sivertsen =

Norwegian artistic gymnast

- Full name: Sigvard Jakob Sivertsen
- Born: 27 February 1881 Bergen, United Kingdoms of Sweden and Norway
- Died: 27 December 1963 (aged 82) Bergen, Norway

Gymnastics career
- Discipline: Men's artistic gymnastics
- Country represented: Norway
- Gym: Bergens TF
Medal record
Men's artistic gymnastics
Representing Norway
Olympic Games
Gold medal – first place	1912 Stockholm	Team, free system
Silver medal – second place	1908 London	Team

Sigvard Jakob Sivertsen (27 February 1881 – 27 December 1963) was a Norwegian gymnast who competed in the 1908 Summer Olympics and in the 1912 Summer Olympics.

As a member of the Norwegian team, he won a silver medal in the gymnastics team event in 1908. Four years later, he was part of the Norwegian team, which won the gold medal in the gymnastics men's team, free system event.

He was born and died in Bergen, and represented Bergens TF.
