= Klaus Suomela =

Finnish artistic gymnast and writer

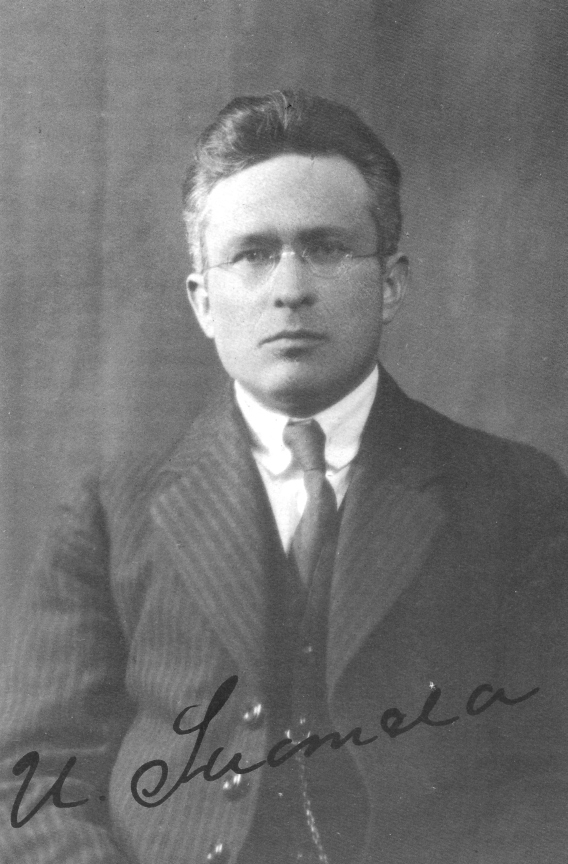

Personal information
- Full name: Klaus Uuno Suomela
- Born: 10 November 1888 Porvoo, Grand Duchy of Finland, Russian Empire
- Died: 4 April 1962 (aged 73) Helsinki, Finland

Gymnastics career
- Discipline: Men's artistic gymnastics
- Country represented: Finland
Medal record
Men's artistic gymnastics
Representing Finland
Olympic Games
Silver medal – second place	1912 Stockholm	Team, free system

Klaus Uuno Suomela (November 10, 1888 – April 4, 1962) was a Finnish artistic gymnast and writer. He won an Olympic silver medal in 1912. One of his most successful works was the film script on which the popular 1942 film Hopeakihlajaiset ("Silver Engagement") was based. Suomela later worked his script into a novel.

He competed as a gymnast in the 1912 Summer Olympics as part of the Finnish team, which won the silver medal in the gymnastics men's team, free system event. His work was also part of the literature event in the art competition at the 1924 Summer Olympics with a 4-act drama, Milo, Olympian sankari ("Milo, Olympic hero").
