= Carl Pedersen (gymnast) =

Danish artistic gymnast (1883–1971)

- Full name: Carl Julius Pedersen
- Born: 25 July 1883 Rø, Denmark
- Died: 18 August 1971 (aged 88) Frederiksberg, Denmark

Gymnastics career
- Discipline: Men's artistic gymnastics
- Country represented: Denmark
Medal record
Men's artistic gymnastics
Representing Denmark
Olympic Games
Bronze medal – third place	1912 Stockholm	Team, free system

Carl Julius Pedersen (25 July 1883 in Rø, Denmark – 18 August 1971 in Frederiksberg, Denmark) was a Danish gymnast who competed in the 1912 Summer Olympics. He was part of the Danish team, which won the bronze medal in the gymnastics men's team, free system event. In the individual all-around competition, he finished 34th.
