= Robert Sjursen =

Norwegian artistic gymnast

- Full name: Robert Emanuel Sjursen
- Born: 8 March 1891 Bergen, United Kingdoms of Sweden and Norway
- Died: 21 July 1965 (aged 74) Bergen, Norway

Gymnastics career
- Discipline: Men's artistic gymnastics
- Country represented: Norway
- Gym: Bergens TF
Medal record
Men's artistic gymnastics
Representing Norway
Olympic Games
Gold medal – first place	1912 Stockholm	Team, free system

Robert Emanuel Sjursen (8 March 1891 – 21 July 1965) was a Norwegian gymnast who competed in the 1912 Summer Olympics. He was part of the Norwegian team, which won the gold medal in the gymnastics men's team, free system event.
