= Ilmari Pernaja =

Finnish artistic gymnast

- Full name: Kustaa Ilmari Pernaja
- Born: 10 February 1892 Kymi, Grand Duchy of Finland, Russian Empire
- Died: 20 July 1963 (aged 71) Rauma, Finland

Gymnastics career
- Discipline: Men's artistic gymnastics
- Country represented: Finland
Medal record
Men's artistic gymnastics
Representing Finland
Olympic Games
Silver medal – second place	1912 Stockholm	Team, free system

Kustaa Ilmari Pernaja (February 10, 1892 – July 20, 1963) was a Finnish gymnast who competed in the 1912 Summer Olympics. He was part of the Finnish team, which won the silver medal in the gymnastics men's team, free system event.
