= Aage Marius Hansen =

Danish gymnast

- Born: 27 September 1890 Dråby, Denmark
- Died: 5 May 1980 (aged 89) Sæby, Denmark

Gymnastics career
- Discipline: Men's artistic gymnastics
- Country represented: Denmark
Medal record
Men's artistic gymnastics
Representing Denmark
Olympic Games
Bronze medal – third place	1912 Stockholm	Team, free system

Aage Marius Hansen (27 September 1890 in Dråby, Denmark – 5 May 1980 in Sæby, Denmark) was a Danish gymnast who competed in the 1912 Summer Olympics. He was part of the Danish team, which won the bronze medal in the gymnastics men's team, free system event in 1912.
