= Eino Saastamoinen =

Finnish artistic gymnast

- Full name: Kaarlo Eino Saastamoinen
- Born: 9 October 1887 Helsingfors, Grand Duchy of Finland, Russian Empire
- Died: 4 December 1946 (aged 59) Helsinki, Finland

Gymnastics career
- Discipline: Men's artistic gymnastics
- Country represented: Finland
Medal record
Men's artistic gymnastics
Representing Finland
Olympic Games
Silver medal – second place	1912 Stockholm	Team, free system

Kaarlo Eino Saastamoinen (9 October 1887 – 4 December 1946) was a Finnish gymnast. He was the flag bearer for Finland at the 1912 Summer Olympics, where he won a team silver medal.
