= Lukas Nielsen =

Danish artistic gymnast

- Full name: Lukas Fredrik Christian Nielsen
- Born: 23 December 1884 Malmö, Sweden
- Died: 29 April 1964 (aged 79) Copenhagen, Denmark

Gymnastics career
- Discipline: Men's artistic gymnastics
- Country represented: Denmark
Medal record
Men's artistic gymnastics
Representing Denmark
Olympic Games
| Bronze medal – third place | 1912 Stockholm | Team, free system |

Lukas Fredrik Christian Nielsen (23 December 1885 in Malmö, Sweden – 29 September 1964 in Copenhagen, Denmark) was a Danish gymnast who competed in the 1908 Summer Olympics and the 1912 Summer Olympics.

In 1908, he finished fourth with the Danish team in the team event. He was part of the Danish team, which won the bronze medal in the gymnastics men's team free system event in 1912.
