= Hannes Sirola =

Finnish artistic gymnast

- Full name: Hannes Rikhard Sirola
- Born: 18 April 1890 Hämeenlinna, Grand Duchy of Finland, Russian Empire
- Died: 4 April 1985 (aged 94) Lahti, Finland

Gymnastics career
- Discipline: Men's artistic gymnastics
- Country represented: Finland
- Club: Ylioppilasvoimistelijat
Medal record
Men's artistic gymnastics
Representing Finland
Olympic Games
Silver medal – second place	1912 Stockholm	Team, free system

Hannes Rikhard Sirola (April 18, 1890 – April 4, 1985) was a Finnish gymnast who competed in the 1912 Summer Olympics. He was part of the Finnish team, which won the silver medal in the gymnastics men's team, free system event.
