= Toni Hyvärinen =

Finnish ice hockey player

- Born: July 14, 1988 (age 36); Kuopio, Finland
- Height: 6 ft 0 in (183 cm)
- Weight: 181 lb (82 kg; 12 st 13 lb)
- Position: Right wing
- Shoots: Right
- Liiga team Former teams: KalPa; KooKoo
- Playing career: 2007–present

Toni Hyvärinen (born July 14, 1988) is a Finnish professional ice hockey player who currently plays for KalPa of the Finnish Liiga.

In 2014, Hyvärinen moved from Jukurit to KalPa in the Finnish Liiga. Before the 2015–16 season, Hyvärinen signed with KooKoo of the Liiga. He signed a contract extension with KooKoo on 1 April 2016.

On 16 August 2018, Hyvärinen agreed to a profession try out with KalPa, which ended with him signing a contract for the 2018–19 season with them.

== Career statistics ==
			Regular season					Playoffs
Season	Team	League	GP	G	A	Pts	PIM	GP	G	A	Pts	PIM
2003–04	KalPa U16	U16 SM-sarja	22	13	25	38	10	7	2	5	7	4
2004–05	KalPa U18	U18 SM-sarja	25	6	8	14	10	6	0	1	1	2
2004–05	KalPa U20	U20 SM-liiga	7	2	2	4	4	—	—	—	—	—
2005–06	KalPa U18	U18 SM-sarja	6	3	4	7	2	—	—	—	—	—
2005–06	KalPa U20	U20 SM-liiga	37	4	3	7	16	5	1	0	1	0
2006–07	KalPa U20	U20 SM-liiga	31	11	8	19	20	3	0	0	0	4
2007–08	KalPa U20	U20 SM-liiga	31	14	17	31	36	11	2	3	5	14
2007–08	KalPa	SM-liiga	13	1	2	3	2	—	—	—	—	—
2008–09	KalPa	SM-liiga	45	4	4	8	6	9	2	0	2	0
2009–10	KalPa U20	U20 SM-liiga	10	2	3	5	39	—	—	—	—	—
2009–10	KalPa	SM-liiga	33	1	3	4	10	9	0	3	3	4
2009–10	SaPKo	Mestis	8	3	9	12	4	—	—	—	—	—
2010–11	KalPa	SM-liiga	48	4	6	10	14	5	0	0	0	10
2011–12	SaPKo	Mestis	44	14	21	35	34	5	1	4	5	4
2012–13	Jukurit	Mestis	46	14	13	27	32	7	3	8	11	12
2013–14	Jukurit	Mestis	15	6	6	12	27	6	1	0	1	2
2014–15	KalPa	Liiga	50	2	8	10	61	6	0	0	0	4
2015–16	KooKoo	Liiga	42	5	4	9	16	—	—	—	—	—
2016–17	KooKoo	Liiga	35	5	6	11	10	—	—	—	—	—
2017–18	KooKoo	Liiga	57	5	8	13	16	—	—	—	—	—
2018–19	KalPa	Liiga	39	3	8	11	20	—	—	—	—	—
SM-liiga totals			362	30	49	79	155	29	2	3	5	18
