= Einar Strøm (gymnast) =

Norwegian artistic gymnast

- Full name: Einar Johan Strøm
- Born: 17 March 1885 Haugesund, United Kingdoms of Sweden and Norway
- Died: 26 September 1964 (aged 79) Bergen, Norway

Gymnastics career
- Discipline: Men's artistic gymnastics
- Country represented: Norway
- Gym: Stavanger
Medal record
Men's artistic gymnastics
Representing Norway
Olympic Games
Gold medal – first place	1912 Stockholm	Team, free system

Einar Johan Strøm (17 March 1885 – 26 September 1964) was a Norwegian gymnast who competed in the 1912 Summer Olympics. He was part of the Norwegian team, which won the gold medal in the men's team, free system event.
