= Steen Olsen =

Danish artistic gymnast

- Full name: Steen Lerche Olsen
- Born: 17 June 1886 Copenhagen, Denmark
- Died: 5 May 1960 (aged 73) Copenhagen, Denmark

Gymnastics career
- Discipline: Men's artistic gymnastics
- Country represented: Denmark
Medal record
Men's artistic gymnastics
Representing Denmark
Olympic Games
Gold medal – first place	1920 Antwerp	Team, free system
Bronze medal – third place	1912 Stockholm	Team, free system

Steen Lerche Olsen (17 June 1886 – 5 May 1960) was a Danish gymnast who competed in the 1912 Summer Olympics and in the 1920 Summer Olympics.

He was part of the Danish team, which won the bronze medal in the gymnastics men's team, free system event in 1912. Eight years later, he won a gold medal in the gymnastics men's team, free system event.
