= Lauri Tanner =

Finnish footballer and gymnast (1890-1950)

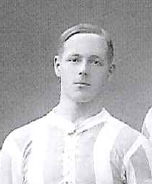
- Tanner in 1911 HJK portrait

Personal information
- Full name: Lauri Arvo Tanner
- Born: 20 November 1890 Helsinki, Grand Duchy of Finland, Russian Empire
- Died: 11 July 1950 (aged 60) Helsinki, Finland

Gymnastics career
- Discipline: Men's artistic gymnastics
- Country represented: Finland
Medal record
Men's artistic gymnastics
Representing Finland
Olympic Games
Silver medal – second place	1912 Stockholm	Team, free system

Lauri Arvo Tanner (20 November 1890 – 11 July 1950) was a Finnish gymnast and amateur football (soccer) player who competed in the 1912 Summer Olympics.

He was part of the Finnish team, which won the silver medal in the men's gymnastics team, free system event. He also competed in the football tournament. His only game was the bronze medal game, which Finland lost against the Netherlands 0–9.
