= Tor Lund =

Norwegian artistic gymnast (1888–1972)

- Born: 20 January 1888 Bergen, United Kingdoms of Sweden and Norway
- Died: 1 September 1972 (aged 84) Bergen, Norway

Gymnastics career
- Discipline: Men's artistic gymnastics
- Country represented: Norway
- Gym: Bergens TF
Medal record
Men's artistic gymnastics
Representing Norway
Olympic Games
Gold medal – first place	1912 Stockholm	Team, free system

Tor Lund (20 January 1888 – 1 September 1972) was a Norwegian gymnast who competed in the 1912 Summer Olympics.

He was part of the Norwegian team, which won the gold medal in the gymnastics men's team, free system event. He was born and died in Bergen, and represented Bergens TF.
