= Petter Martinsen =

Norwegian artistic gymnast

- Full name: Petter Marentius Martinsen
- Born: 14 May 1887 Sarpsborg, United Kingdoms of Sweden and Norway
- Died: 27 December 1972 (aged 85) Sarpsborg, Norway

Gymnastics career
- Discipline: Men's artistic gymnastics
- Country represented: Norway
- Club: Turn- og Idrettslaget National
Medal record
Men's artistic gymnastics
Representing Norway
Olympic Games
Gold medal – first place	1912 Stockholm	Team, free system

Petter Marentius Martinsen (14 May 1887 – 27 December 1972) was a Norwegian gymnast who competed in the 1912 Summer Olympics. He was part of the Norwegian team, which won the gold medal in the gymnastics men's team, free system event.
