= Gabriel Thorstensen =

Norwegian artistic gymnast

- Born: 1 September 1888 Stavanger, United Kingdoms of Sweden and Norway
- Died: 14 June 1974 (aged 85) Stavanger, Norway
- Relatives: Thomas Thorstensen (brother)

Gymnastics career
- Discipline: Men's artistic gymnastics
- Country represented: Norway
- Gym: Stavanger Turnforening
Medal record
Men's artistic gymnastics
Representing Norway
Olympic Games
Gold medal – first place	1912 Stockholm	Team, free system

Gabriel Thorstensen (1 September 1888 – 14 June 1974) was a Norwegian gymnast who competed in the 1912 Summer Olympics.

He was part of the Norwegian team, which won the gold medal in the gymnastics men's team, free system event.
