= Christian Svendsen =

Danish gymnast

- Full name: Christian Valdemar Svendsen
- Born: 13 July 1890 Svindlinge, Denmark
- Died: 28 June 1959 (aged 68) Copenhagen, Denmark

Gymnastics career
- Discipline: Men's artistic gymnastics
- Country represented: Denmark
Medal record
Men's artistic gymnastics
Representing Denmark
Olympic Games
Bronze medal – third place	1912 Stockholm	Team, free system

Christian Valdemar Svendsen (13 July 1890 Svindlinge, Funen, Denmark – 28 June 1959 in Copenhagen, Denmark) was a Danish gymnast who competed in the 1912 Summer Olympics. He was part of the Danish team, which won the bronze medal in the gymnastics men's team, free system event.
