= Eino Forsström =

Finnish gymnast (1889–1961)

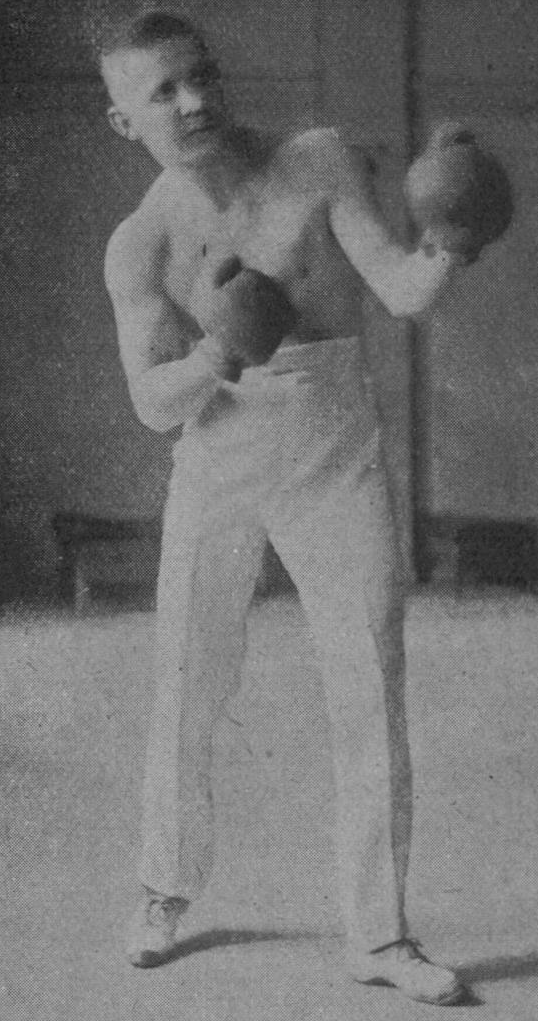
- Forsström c. 1911

Personal information
- Full name: Eino Vilho Forsström
- Born: 10 April 1889 Helsinki, Grand Duchy of Finland, Russian Empire
- Died: 26 July 1961 (aged 72) Helsinki, Finland

Gymnastics career
- Discipline: Men's artistic gymnastics
- Country represented: Finland
Medal record
Men's artistic gymnastics
Representing Finland
Olympic Games
Silver medal – second place	1912 Stockholm	Team, free system
Bronze medal – third place	1908 London	Team

Eino Vilho Forsström (10 April 1889 – 26 July 1961) was a Finnish gymnast who won two medals in the 1908 and 1912 Summer Olympics.

== Gymnastics career ==
At the time of the Games, Forsström represented the club Katajaiset.

He won the Finnish national championship in team gymnastics as a member of Ylioppilasvoimistelijat in 1909.

== Personal life ==
He was among the best boxers in Finland in 1908–1910.

He married Matilda Irene Larsson in 1915.

== Olympic results ==
Eino Forsström at the Olympic Games
Games	Event	Rank	Notes
1908 Summer Olympics	Men's team	3rd	Source:
1912 Summer Olympics	Men's team, free system	2nd	
