= Isak Abrahamsen =

Norwegian gymnast (1891–1972)

- Born: 28 April 1891 Bergen, United Kingdoms of Sweden and Norway
- Died: 29 April 1972 (aged 81) Oslo, Norway

Gymnastics career
- Discipline: Men's artistic gymnastics
- Country represented: Norway
- Club: Turn & Idrettsforeningen Viking
Medal record
Men's artistic gymnastics
Representing Norway
Olympic Games
Gold medal – first place	1912 Stockholm	Team, free system

Isak Abrahamsen (28 April 1891 – 22 April 1972) was a Norwegian gymnast who competed in the 1912 Summer Olympics. He was part of the Norwegian team, which won the gold medal in the gymnastics men's team, free system event.
