= Christian Hansen (gymnast) =

Danish gymnast

- Full name: Christian Marius Hansen
- Born: 24 September 1891 Fredericia, Denmark
- Died: 13 June 1961 (aged 69) Copenhagen, Denmark

Gymnastics career
- Discipline: Men's artistic gymnastics
- Country represented: Denmark
Medal record
Men's artistic gymnastics
Representing Denmark
Olympic Games
Bronze medal – third place	1912 Stockholm	Team, free system

Christian Marius Hansen (24 September 1891 in Fredericia, Denmark – 13 June 1961 in Copenhagen, Denmark) was a Danish gymnast who competed in the 1908 Summer Olympics and in the 1912 Summer Olympics.

He was part of the Danish team, which finished fourth in the gymnastics team event in 1908. Four years later, he won the bronze medal in the gymnastics men's team, free system event.
