= Kaarlo Vähämäki =

Finnish gymnast

- Full name: Karl Gustaf Vähämäki
- Born: 30 May 1892 Helsinki, Grand Duchy of Finland, Russian Empire
- Died: 1 January 1984 (aged 91)

Gymnastics career
- Discipline: Men's artistic gymnastics
- Country represented: Finland
- Club: Ylioppilasvoimistelijat
Medal record
Men's artistic gymnastics
Representing Finland
Olympic Games
Silver medal – second place	1912 Stockholm	Team, free system

Karl Gustaf "Kaarlo" Vähämäki (30 May 1892 – 1 January 1984) was a Finnish gymnast who competed in the 1912 Summer Olympics in Stockholm. He was part of the Finnish team, which won the silver medal in the gymnastics men's team, free system event.
