= Hjalmar Peter Johansen =

Danish gymnast

- Full name: Hjalmar Peter Martin Johansen
- Born: 1 November 1892 Copenhagen, Denmark
- Died: 9 December 1979 (aged 87) Copenhagen, Denmark

Gymnastics career
- Discipline: Men's artistic gymnastics
- Country represented: Denmark
Medal record
Men's artistic gymnastics
Representing Denmark
Olympic Games
Bronze medal – third place	1912 Stockholm	Team, free system

Hjalmar Peter Martin Johansen (1 November 1892 – 9 December 1979) was a Danish gymnast who competed in the 1912 Summer Olympics. He was born and died in Copenhagen, and was part of the Danish team which won the bronze medal in the gymnastics men's team, free system event in 1912.
