= Aarne Pelkonen =

Finnish artistic gymnast

- Full name: Aarne Eliel Tellervo Pelkonen
- Born: 24 November 1891 Jaakkima, Grand Duchy of Finland, Russian Empire
- Died: 6 November 1959 (aged 67) Helsinki, Finland

Gymnastics career
- Discipline: Men's artistic gymnastics
- Country represented: Finland
Medal record
Men's artistic gymnastics
Representing Finland
Olympic Games
Silver medal – second place	1912 Stockholm	Team, free system

Aarne Eliel Tellervo Pelkonen (November 24, 1891 – November 6, 1959) was a Finnish gymnast who competed in the 1912 Summer Olympics.

He was part of the Finnish team, which won the silver medal in the gymnastics men's team, free system event.
