= Rikard Nordstrøm =

Danish gymnast

- Full name: Rikard Hannibal Wilhelm Nordstrøm
- Born: 23 April 1893 Copenhagen, Denmark
- Died: 7 February 1955 (aged 61) Copenhagen, Denmark

Gymnastics career
- Discipline: Men's artistic gymnastics
- Country represented: Denmark
Medal record
Men's artistic gymnastics
Representing Denmark
Olympic Games
Bronze medal – third place	1912 Stockholm	Team, free system

Rikard Hannibal Wilhelm Nordstrøm (23 April 1893 - 7 February 1955) was a Danish gymnast who competed in the 1912 Summer Olympics. He was part of the Danish team, which won the bronze medal in the gymnastics men's team, free system event.
