= Jalmari Kivenheimo =

Finnish gymnast

- Full name: Viktor Jalmar "Jalmari" Kivenheimo
- Born: 25 September 1889 Tuusula, Grand Duchy of Finland, Russian Empire
- Died: 29 October 1994 (aged 105) Mikkeli, Finland

Gymnastics career
- Discipline: Men's artistic gymnastics
- Country represented: Finland
Medal record
Men's artistic gymnastics
Representing Finland
Olympic Games
Silver medal – second place	1912 Stockholm	Team, free system

Viktor Jalmar "Jalmari" Kivenheimo (25 September 1889 – 29 October 1994) was a Finnish gymnast who competed in the 1912 Summer Olympics.

He was part of the Finnish team, which won the silver medal in the gymnastics men's team, free system event. He is the longest-lived Olympic medalist, and he died in 1994 at the age of 105. He was the last surviving Olympic medalist born before the 1896 Games began on 6 April.
