= Väinö Tiiri =

Finnish artistic gymnast

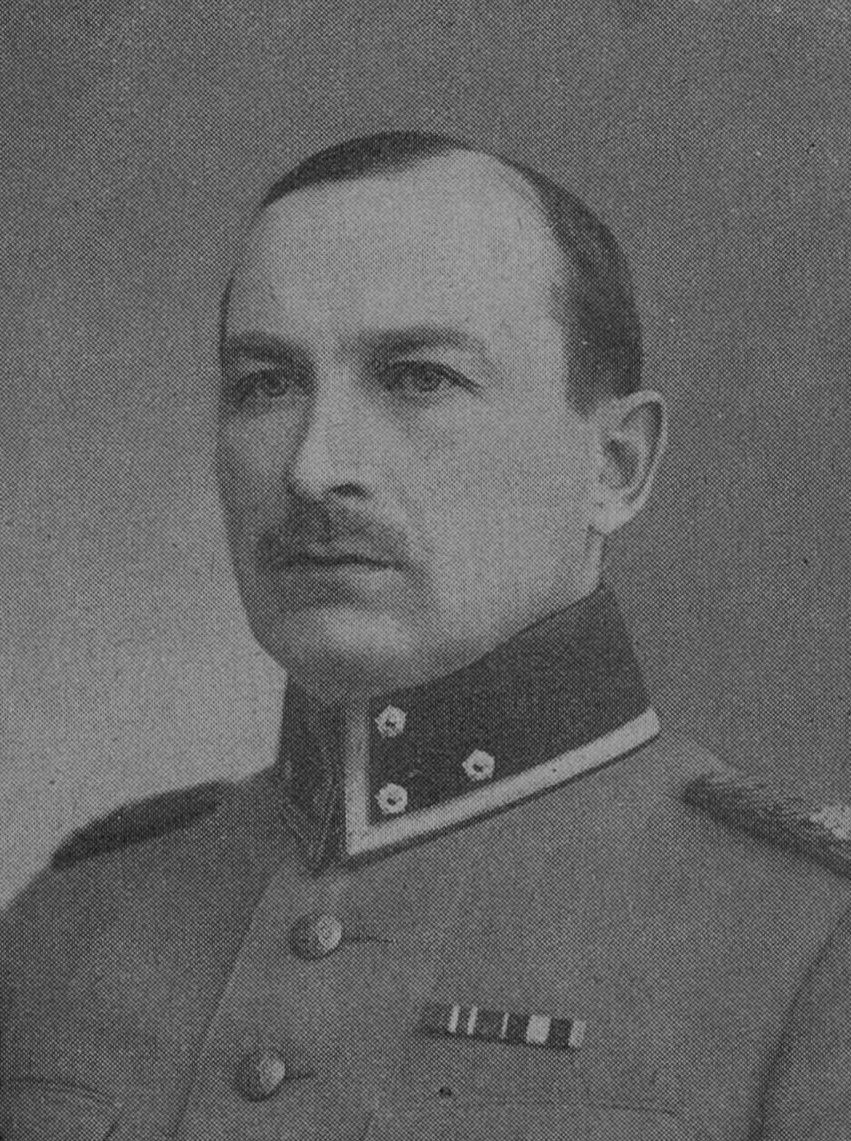
- Tiiri c. 1936

Personal information
- Full name: Väinö Edward Tiiri
- Born: 31 January 1886 Loimaa, Grand Duchy of Finland, Russian Empire
- Died: 30 July 1966 (aged 80) Helsinki, Finland

Gymnastics career
- Discipline: Men's artistic gymnastics
- Country represented: Finland
- Club: Ylioppilasvoimistelijat
Medal record
Men's artistic gymnastics
Representing Finland
Olympic Games
Silver medal – second place	1912 Stockholm	Team, free system
Bronze medal – third place	1908 London	Team

Väinö Edward Tiiri (31 January 1886 – 30 July 1966) was a Finnish gymnast who won two Olympic medals.

== Sport ==
=== Olympics ===
Väinö Tiiri at the Olympic Games
Games	Event	Rank	Notes
1908 Summer Olympics	Men's team	3rd	Source:
1912 Summer Olympics	Team, free system	2nd	

He was in the Finnish team leadership in the 1924 and 1928 games.

He was a judge at the gymnastics at the 1928 Summer Olympics.

=== Other ===
He won the Finnish national championship in team gymnastics as a member of Ylioppilasvoimistelijat in 1909.

He was the chairman of the boys' chapter of the Finnish Gymnastics and Sports Federation in 1924–1926.

He was a founding member of the fencing club Helsingin Miekkailijat.

He was the leader of the Suomen Urheilulehti editorial staff in 1909–1917. He edited sports-related articles in the encyclopedia Pieni tietosanakirja.

He held positions of trust in several national-level sports federations.

== Career ==
He completed his matriculation exam in Turku Finnish Real Lycaeum in 1907 and graduated as a gymnastics teacher in 1911. He worked as a gymnastics teacher up to 1952.

He completed Artillery Officer School in 1918 and eventually reached the rank of major in 1928.

He was the physical education officer of the Finnish Defence Forces for over ten years. He served as a battalion commander in the World War II.

He was an editor in Uusi Suomi and Suomen Sotilas.

== Politics ==
He was one of the members of the central committee responsible of the creation of the Jäger Movement. He was nominated an honorary jäger in 1961.

== Family ==
Tiiri's parents were Kalle and Maria Tiiri. He married Helmi Koski in 1921. His only child was named Juhana.

He was buried in Helsinki at Hietaniemi Cemetery.

== Accolades ==
He received the following honorary awards:

- Cross of Liberty, 3rd Class
- Cross of Liberty, 4th Class
- Knight (Chevalier) of the White Rose of Finland
- The Jaeger Activist Medal
- memorial medals of three wars
