= Nils Voss =

Norwegian artistic gymnast

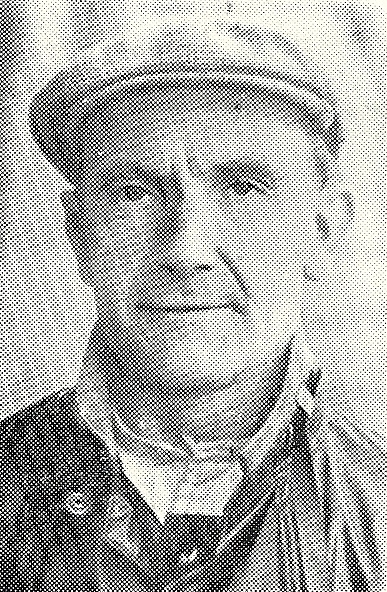

Personal information
- Full name: Nils Knutsen Voss
- Born: 22 February 1886 Voss Municipality, United Kingdoms of Sweden and Norway
- Died: 7 October 1969 (aged 83) Sandnes Municipality, Norway

Gymnastics career
- Discipline: Men's artistic gymnastics
- Country represented: Norway
- Gym: Stavanger Turnforening
Medal record
Men's artistic gymnastics
Representing Norway
Olympic Games
Gold medal – first place	1912 Stockholm	Team, free system

Nils Knutsen Voss (22 February 1886 – 7 October 1969) was a Norwegian gymnast who competed in the 1912 Summer Olympics. He was part of the Norwegian team, which won the gold medal in the gymnastics men's team, free system event.
