= Hans Beyer =

Norwegian gymnast (1889–1965)

- Full name: Hans Anton Beyer
- Born: 23 August 1889 Bergen, United Kingdoms of Sweden and Norway
- Died: 15 May 1965 (aged 75) Mo i Rana, Norway

Gymnastics career
- Discipline: Men's artistic gymnastics
- Country represented: Norway
- Club: Bergens TF
Medal record
Men's artistic gymnastics
Representing Norway
Olympic Games
Gold medal – first place	1912 Stockholm	Team, free system

Hans Anton Beyer (23 August 1889 – 15 May 1965) was a Norwegian gymnast who competed in the 1912 Summer Olympics.

He was part of the Norwegian team, which won the gold medal in the gymnastics men's team, free system event. He was born in Bergen and died in Mo i Rana, and represented Bergens TF.
