= Hjalmart Andersen =

Danish gymnast

- Full name: Hjalmart Nørregaard Andersen
- Born: 11 October 1889 Stubbekøbing, Denmark
- Died: 23 January 1974 (aged 84) Risskov, Denmark

Gymnastics career
- Discipline: Men's artistic gymnastics
- Country represented: Denmark
Medal record
Men's artistic gymnastics
Representing Denmark
Olympic Games
Bronze medal – third place	1912 Stockholm	Team, free system

Hjalmart Nørregaard Andersen (11 October 1889 in Stubbekøbing, Denmark – 23 January 1974 in Risskov, Århus, Denmark) was a Danish gymnast who competed in the 1912 Summer Olympics. He was part of the Danish team, which won the bronze medal in the gymnastics men's team, free system event.
