= Tauno Ilmoniemi =

Finnish colonel and gymnast

- Born: 16 May 1893 Kuopion maalaiskunta, Grand Duchy of Finland, Russian Empire
- Died: 21 September 1934 (aged 41) Oulu, Finland

Gymnastics career
- Discipline: Men's artistic gymnastics
- Country represented: Finland
Medal record
Men's artistic gymnastics
Representing Finland
Olympic Games
| Silver medal – second place | 1912 Stockholm | Team, free system |

Tauno Ilmoniemi (ne Granit) (16 May 1893 – 21 September 1934) was a Finnish gymnast and diver who competed in the 1912 Summer Olympics.

Ilmoniemi was part of the Finnish team that won the silver medal in the gymnastics men's team free system event.

He also competed in the plain high diving event but was eliminated in the first round.
