= Jacob Opdahl =

Norwegian artistic gymnast

- Born: 15 January 1894 Bergen, United Kingdoms of Sweden and Norway
- Died: 20 March 1938 (aged 44) Bergen, Norway
- Relatives: Nils Opdahl (brother)

Gymnastics career
- Discipline: Men's artistic gymnastics
- Country represented: Norway
- Gym: Bergens TF
Medal record
Men's artistic gymnastics
Representing Norway
Olympic Games
Gold medal – first place	1912 Stockholm	Team, free system
Silver medal – second place	1920 Antwerp	Team, free system

Jacob Opdahl (15 January 1894 – 20 March 1938) was a Norwegian gymnast who competed in the 1912 Summer Olympics and in the 1920 Summer Olympics.

In 1912, he was part of the Norwegian team, which won the gold medal in the gymnastics men's team, free system event. Eight years later he won a silver medal again as member of the Norwegian gymnastics team.

He was born and died in Bergen, was a brother of Nils Opdahl, and represented Bergens TF.
