= Mikko Hyvärinen =

Finnish artistic gymnast

- Full name: Johannes Mikael Hyvärinen
- Born: 8 January 1889 Kontiolahti, Grand Duchy of Finland, Russian Empire
- Died: 6 June 1973 (aged 84) Kuopio, Finland

Gymnastics career
- Discipline: Men's artistic gymnastics
- Country represented: Finland
Medal record
Men's artistic gymnastics
Representing Finland
Olympic Games
Silver medal – second place	1912 Stockholm	Team, free system

Johannes Mikael "Mikko" Hyvärinen (January 8, 1889 – June 6, 1973) was a Finnish gymnast who competed in the 1912 Summer Olympics. He was part of the Finnish team, which won the silver medal in the gymnastics men's team, free system event.
