= Ilmari Keinänen =

Finnish gymnast

- Born: 5 November 1887 Kuopio, Grand Duchy of Finland, Russian Empire
- Died: 8 November 1934 (aged 47) Joensuu, Finland

Gymnastics career
- Discipline: Men's artistic gymnastics
- Country represented: Finland
Medal record
Men's artistic gymnastics
Representing Finland
Olympic Games
Silver medal – second place	1912 Stockholm	Team, free system

Ilmari Keinänen (5 November 1887, in Kuopio – 8 November 1934) was a Finnish gymnast who competed in the 1912 Summer Olympics. He was part of the Finnish team, which won the silver medal in the gymnastics men's team, free system event.
