= Eero Hyvärinen =

Finnish artistic gymnast

- Full name: Eero Juho Hyvärinen
- Born: 27 April 1890 Kontiolahti, Grand Duchy of Finland, Russian Empire
- Died: 27 May 1973 (aged 83) Lahti, Finland

Gymnastics career
- Discipline: Men's artistic gymnastics
- Country represented: Finland
Medal record
Men's artistic gymnastics
Representing Finland
Olympic Games
| Silver medal – second place | 1912 Stockholm | Team, free system |

Eero Juho Hyvärinen (April 27, 1890 – May 27, 1973) was a Finnish gymnast who competed in the 1912 Summer Olympics. He was part of the Finnish team, which won the silver medal in the gymnastics men's team, free system event.
