= Nils Opdahl =

Norwegian gymnast (1882–1951)

- Born: 16 November 1882 Bergen, United Kingdoms of Sweden and Norway
- Died: 28 December 1951 (aged 69) Bergen, Norway
- Relatives: Jacob Opdahl (brother)

Gymnastics career
- Discipline: Men's artistic gymnastics
- Country represented: Norway
- Gym: Bergens TF
Medal record
Men's artistic gymnastics
Representing Norway
Olympic Games
Gold medal – first place	1912 Stockholm	Team, free system

Nils Opdahl (16 November 1882 – 28 December 1951) was a Norwegian gymnast who competed in the 1912 Summer Olympics.

He was part of the Norwegian team, which won the gold medal in the gymnastics men's team, free system event. He was born and died in Bergen, was a brother of Jacob Opdahl, and represented Bergens TF.
