= Christian Pedersen (gymnast) =

Danish artistic gymnast

- Full name: Christian Møller Pedersen
- Born: 27 October 1889 Holstebro, Denmark
- Died: 22 March 1953 (aged 63) Copenhagen, Denmark

Gymnastics career
- Discipline: Men's artistic gymnastics
- Country represented: Denmark
Medal record
Men's artistic gymnastics
Representing Denmark
Olympic Games
Gold medal – first place	1920 Antwerp	Team, free system

Christian Møller Pedersen (27 October 1889 – 22 March 1953) was a Danish gymnast who competed in the 1920 Summer Olympics. He was part of the Danish team, which won the gold medal in the gymnastics men's team, free system event in 1920.
