= Bergens TF =

Norwegian sports club

Bergens Turn
- Full name: Bergens Turnforening
- Founded: 5 March 1882
- Ground: Fana stadion (athletics), Turnhallen (gymnastics); Bergen

Bergens Turnforening, often shortened to Bergens Turn is a Norwegian sports club from Bergen, founded in 1882. It has sections for athletics, orienteering, gymnastics and rhythmic gymnastics. The biggest international success has come in gymnastics, where the club had multiple Olympic champions before the Second World War. In the same period the club saw its heyday in Norwegian athletics; it is now a feeder team of IL Gular.

== General history ==
The club was founded on 5 March 1882, among others by Johan Martens. He was a sportive pioneer who chaired the club from 1882 to 1888 and 1892 to 1897, and also the Norges Turn- og Gymnastikkforbund from 1899 to 1911 and the Norwegian National Confederation of Sports from 1910 to 1914.

== Gymnastics ==
Olympic medal winners include Sigvard Sivertsen (1908, team and 1912, free system team), Bjarne Johnsen (1912, free system team), Knud Leonard Knudsen (1912, free system team), Tor Lund (1912, free system team), Hans Beyer (1912, free system team), Sigurd Jørgensen (1912, free system team), Nils Opdahl (1912, free system team), Jacob Opdahl (1912, free system team and 1920, free system team), Lauritz Wigand-Larsen (1920, free system team), Jakob Erstad (1920, free system team), and Otto Johannessen (1920, free system team). Tore Lie represented Bergens TF, and was a 1972 Olympian.

== Athletics ==
The best known athlete to represent Bergens TF is Johan Christian Evandt, who dominated the standing jumps. Between 1956 and 1966 he won seven Norwegian titles in the standing high jump, and ten in the standing long jump. His personal bests were 1.77 metres in the standing high jump and 3.65 in the standing long jump, both of which were Norwegian records for some time. Jan W. Larsen won the standing long jump national championship in 1953, and took three other medals. He also took three silvers in the standing high jump.

The club saw its heyday before the Second World War. In the high jump, J. Bergmann-Olsen became Norwegian champion in 1927 and won the silver in 1928. In the hurdles, Haakon Semeleng won a bronze medal (110 m) in 1923 and Ragnar Rødseter in 1937 (400 m). Jacob de Rytter Kielland won bronze medals in the shot put and javelin throw in 1901; Bjarne Meyer took a javelin bronze in 1928.

Peter Jersin won the 500 metres and 1500 metres in 1901, Johan Eliassen took a 400 metres silver in 1903. The latter took a long jump bronze in 1903 as well. Bronze medals were claimed by Birger Hagemann in 1901 (100 metres), Helge Svaar in 1958 and 1959 (200 metres), and Kasper Slåttrem in 1937 (5000 metres). The latter also won a decathlon silver medal in 1933, and a pentathlon bronze in 1934.

The club has had considerably less success among women. Synnøva Reiakvam, later married Borgen, became Norwegian high jump champion in 1955 and 1957, and also won medals in 1956 and 1958. She also won the standing high jump in 1957 and 1958, and bronze and silver in 1955 and 1956. Hallfrid Østerbø won the now-defunct event called swing-ball throw in 1953 and 1954.

The athletics section is now a feeder team of IL Gular.

== Orienteering ==
Åge Hadler has represented Bergens TF.
