= Gymnastics at the 1920 Summer Olympics =

Gymnastics at the Games of the VII Olympiad
- Venue: Beerschot Stadium
- Dates: 23-27 August 1920

The competition of gymnastics at the 1920 Summer Olympics was held from Monday 23 to Friday 27 August 1920 at the Beerschot Stadium in Antwerp. Four events were contested and only men were allowed to compete.

== Medal summary ==
Games	Gold	Silver	Bronze
All-around, Individual	Giorgio Zampori; Italy	Marco Torrès; France	Jean Gounot; France
All-Around, Team	Italy; Arnaldo Andreoli; Ettore Bellotto; Pietro Bianchi; Fernando Bonatti; Luigi Cambiaso; Luigi Contessi; Carlo Costigliolo; Luigi Costigliolo; Giuseppe Domenichelli; Roberto Ferrari; Carlo Fregosi; Romualdo Ghiglione; Ambrogio Levati; Francesco Loi; Vittorio Lucchetti; Luigi Maiocco; Ferdinando Mandrini; Lorenzo Mangiante; Antonio Marovelli; Michele Mastromarino; Giuseppe Paris; Manlio Pastorini; Ezio Roselli; Paolo Salvi; Giovanni Tubino; Giorgio Zampori; Angelo Zorzi	Belgium; Eugenius Auwerkerken; Théophile Bauer; François Claessens; Augustus Cootmans; Frans Gibens; Albert Haepers; Domien Jacob; Félicien Kempeneers; Jules Labéeu; Hubert Lafortune; Auguste Landrieu; Charles Lannie; Constant Loriot; Nicolaas Moerloos; Ferdinand Minnaert; Louis Stoop; Jean Van Guysse; Alphonse Van Mele; François Verboven; Jean Verboven; Julien Verdonck; Joseph Verstraeten; Georges Vivex; Julianus Wagemans	France; Georges Berger; Émile Bouchès; René Boulanger; Alfred Buyenne; Eugène Cordonnier; Léon Delsarte; Lucien Démanet; Paul Durin; Georges Duvant; Fernand Fauconnier; Arthur Hermann; Albert Hersoy; André Higelin; Auguste Hoël; Louis Quempe; Georges Lagouge; Paulin Lemaire; Ernest Lespinasse; Émile Boitelle; Jules Pirard; Eugène Pollet; Georges Thurnherr; Marco Torrès; François Walker; Julien Wartelle; Paul Wartelle
Team, free system	Denmark; Georg Albertsen; Rudolf Andersen; Viggo Dibbern; Aage Frandsen; Hugo Helsten; Harry Holm; Herold Jansson; Robert Johnsen; Christian Juhl; Vilhelm Lange; Svend Madsen; Peder Marcussen; Peder Møller; Niels Turin Nielsen; Steen Olsen; Christian Pedersen; Stig Rønne; Harry Sørensen; Christian Thomas; Knud Vermehren	Norway; Alf Aanning; Karl Aas; Jørgen Andersen; Gustav Bayer; Jørgen Bjørnstad; Asbjørn Bodahl; Eilert Bøhm; Trygve Bøyesen; Ingolf Davidsen; Håkon Endreson; Jacob Erstad; Harald Færstad; Hermann Helgesen; Petter Hol; Otto Johannessen; John Anker Johansen; Torbjørn Kristoffersen; Henrik Nielsen; Jacob Opdahl; Arthur Rydstrøm; Frithjof Sælen; Bjørn Skjærpe; Wilhelm Steffensen; Olav Sundal; Reidar Tønsberg; Lauritz Wigand-Larsen	No further competitors
Team, Swedish system	Sweden; Fausto Acke; Albert Andersson; Arvid Andersson-Holtman; Helge Bäckander; Bengt Bengtsson; Fabian Biörck; Erik Charpentier; Sture Ericsson-Ewréus; Konrad Granström; Helge Gustafsson; Åke Häger; Ture Hedman; Sven Johnson; Sven-Olof Jonsson; Karl Lindahl; Edmund Lindmark; Bengt Mohrberg; Frans Persson; Klas Särner; Curt Sjöberg; Gunnar Söderlindh; John Sörenson; Erik Svensén; Gösta Törner	Denmark; Johannes Birk; Frede Hansen; Frederik Hansen; Kristian Hansen; Hans Jakobsen; Aage Jørgensen; Alfred Frøkjær Jørgensen; Alfred Ollerup Jørgensen; Arne Jørgensen; Knud Kirkeløkke; Jens Lambæk; Kristian Larsen; Kristian Madsen; Niels Erik Nielsen; Niels Kristian Nielsen; Dynes Pedersen; Hans Pedersen; Johannes Pedersen; Peter Dorf Pedersen; Rasmus Rasmussen; Hans Christian Sørensen; Hans Laurids Sørensen; Søren Sørensen; Georg Vest; Aage Walther	Belgium; Paul Arets; Léon Bronckaert; Léopold Clabots; Jean-Baptiste Claessens; Léon Darrien; Lucien Dehoux; Ernest Deleu; Émile Duboisson; Ernest Dureuil; Joseph Fiems; Marcel Hansen; Louis Henin; Omer Hoffman; Félix Logiest; Charles Maerschalck; René Paenhuijsen; Arnold Pierrot; René Pinchart; Gaspard Pirotte; Augustien Pluys; Léopold Son; Édouard Taeymans; Pierre Thiriar; Henri Verhavert

== Participating nations ==
A total of 250(*) gymnasts from 11 nations competed at the Antwerp Games:

- Belgium (48)
- Czechoslovakia (16)
- Denmark (45)(*)
- Egypt (2)
- France (29)
- Great Britain (27)
- Italy (27)
- Monaco (2)
- Norway (26)
- Sweden (24)
- United States (4)

(*) NOTE: Both amounts are given without the four Danish gymnasts, which are exclusively listed in the IOC medal database.

== Medal table ==
Rank	Nation	Gold	Silver	Bronze	Total
1	Italy	2	0	0	2
2	Denmark	1	1	0	2
3	Sweden	1	0	0	1
4	France	0	1	2	3
5	Belgium	0	1	1	2
6	Norway	0	1	0	1
Totals (6 entries)		4	4	3	11

== Sources ==
- "Olympic Medal Winners". International Olympic Committee.
- Official report of the 1920 Olympic Games
- De Wael
- Wudarski
- databaseOlympics
- various books by Kamper/Mallon and others
