= Belgium at the 1920 Summer Olympics =

- IOC code: BEL
- NOC: Belgian Olympic Committee

in Antwerp
- Competitors: 336 (326 men, 10 women) in 23 sports
- Flag bearer: Victor Boin (fencing)
- Medals Ranked 5th: Gold 14 Silver 11 Bronze 11 Total 36

Summer Olympics appearances (overview)
- 1900; 1904; 1908; 1912; 1920; 1924; 1928; 1932; 1936; 1948; 1952; 1956; 1960; 1964; 1968; 1972; 1976; 1980; 1984; 1988; 1992; 1996; 2000; 2004; 2008; 2012; 2016; 2020; 2024

Other related appearances
- 1906 Intercalated Games

Belgium was the host nation for the 1920 Summer Olympics in Antwerp. 336 competitors, 326 men and 10 women, took part in 121 events in 23 sports.

== Medalists ==
=== Gold ===
- Edmond Cloetens — Archery, Men's Individual fixed large bird
- Edmond Cloetens, Louis van de Perck, Firmin Flamand, Edmond van Moer, Joseph Hermans and Auguste van de Verre — Archery, Men's Team fixed large bird
- Edmond Cloetens, Louis van de Perck, Firmin Flamand, Edmond van Moer, Joseph Hermans and Auguste van de Verre — Archery, Men's Team fixed small bird
- Edmond van Moer — Archery, Men's Individual fixed small bird
- Hubert Van Innis, Alphonse Allaert, Edmond de Knibber, Louis Delcon, Jérome de Mayer, Pierre van Thielt, Louis Fierens and Louis van Beeck — Archery, Men's Team moving bird 33m
- Hubert Van Innis, Alphonse Allaert, Edmond de Knibber, Louis Delcon, Jérome de Mayer, Pierre van Thielt, Louis Fierens and Louis van Beeck — Archery, Men's Team moving bird 50m
- Hubert Van Innis — Archery, Men's Individual moving bird 28m
- Hubert Van Innis — Archery, Men's Individual moving bird 33m
- Henry George — Cycling, Men's 50 km
- Daniel Bouckaert — Equestrian, Individual vaulting
- Daniel Bouckaert, Louis Finet and Maurice Van Ranst, van Schauwbroeck and van Cauwenberg — Equestrian, Team vaulting
- Men's Team — Football
- Emile Cornellie, Florimond Cornellie and Frédéric Bruynseels — Sailing, Men's 6 metre class
- Frans de Haes — Weightlifting, Featherweight

=== Silver ===
- Louis van de Perck — Archery, Men's Individual fixed large bird
- Louis van de Perck — Archery, Men's Individual fixed small bird
- Hubert Van Innis, Alphonse Allaert, Edmond de Knibber, Louis Delcon, Jérome de Mayer, Pierre van Thielt, Louis Fierens and Louis van Beeck — Archery, Men's Team moving bird 28m
- Hubert Van Innis — Archery, Men's Individual moving bird 50m
- Men's Team — Equestrian
- Men's Team — Fencing, Men's Team Epee
- Men's Team — Gymnastics
- Léon Huybrechts, Charles van den Bussche and John Klotz — Sailing, 6 metre class (1919 rating)
- Albert Bosquet, Joseph Cogels, Emile Dupont, Henri Quersin, Louis van Tilt and Edouard Fesinger — Shooting, Men's Team clay pigeons
- Albert Durant, Gérard Blitz, Maurice Blitz, Joseph Pletincx, Paul Gailly, Pierre Nijs, René Bauwens and Pierre Dewin — Water polo, Men's Team competition
- Louis Williquet — Weightlifting, Lightweight

=== Bronze ===
- Firmin Flamand — Archery, Men's Individual fixed large bird
- Joseph Hermans — Archery, Men's Individual fixed small bird
- Albert de Buinne, André Vercruysse, Bernard Janssens and Albert Wyckmans — Cycling, Men's Team Time Trial
- Roger Moeremans d'Emaüs, Oswald Lints, Jules Bonvalet and Jacques Misonne — Equestrian, Men's Team three-day event
- Louis Finet — Equestrian, Individual vaulting
- Men's Team (Swedish system) — Gymnastics
- Men's Team — Hockey
- Albert Grisar, Willy de l'Arbre, Léopold Standaert, Henri Weewauters and Georges Hellebuyck — Sailing, 8 metre class (1919 rating)
- Gerard Blitz — Swimming, Men's 100m backstroke
- Men's Team — Tug of war
- Georges Rooms — Weightlifting, Lightweight
- Fernande Arendt — Tennis, Women's doubles

== Archery ==
Belgium sent 14 archers in its second Olympic archery appearance. The six competitors who competed in the fixed bird events had no international competitions, and took the guaranteed 4 gold medals, 2 silvers, and 2 bronzes. Van Innis, a veteran of Belgium's first appearance in 1900, faced a lone French archer in each of the three individual moving bird competitions; he took two of the three gold medals and one silver. In the team moving bird competitions, the Belgian team faced off against France in the 50 and 33 metre events, beating the French team both times. The Netherlands sent a team for the 28 metre competition, which knocked Belgium down to second place in that event.

Overall, the team took 8 of 10 possible gold medals as well as 4 silvers and 2 bronzes. They had been guaranteed 4 golds, 7 silvers, and 3 bronzes at worst.

Archer	Event	Final	
Archer	Event	Score	Rank
Edmond Cloetens	Fixed large bird	13	1st place, gold medalist(s)
Edmond Cloetens	Fixed small bird	4	5
Firmin Flamand	Fixed large bird	7	3rd place, bronze medalist(s)
Firmin Flamand	Fixed small bird	5	4
Joseph Hermans	Fixed large bird	5	5
Joseph Hermans	Fixed small bird	6	3rd place, bronze medalist(s)
Louis van de Perck	Fixed large bird	11	2nd place, silver medalist(s)
Louis van de Perck	Fixed small bird	8	2nd place, silver medalist(s)
Auguste van de Verre	Fixed large bird	3	6
Auguste van de Verre	Fixed small bird	1	6
Hubert Van Innis	Moving bird, 50 m	106	2nd place, silver medalist(s)
Hubert Van Innis	Moving bird, 33 m	139	1st place, gold medalist(s)
Hubert Van Innis	Moving bird, 28 m	172	1st place, gold medalist(s)
Edmond van Moer	Fixed large bird	6	4
Edmond van Moer	Fixed small bird	11	1st place, gold medalist(s)
Edmond Cloetens; Firmin Flamand; Joseph Hermans; Louis Van De Perck; Auguste Van De Verre; Edmond Van Moer	Team fixed large bird	31	1st place, gold medalist(s)
Edmond Cloetens; Firmin Flamand; Joseph Hermans; Louis Van De Perck; Auguste Van De Verre; Edmond Van Moer	Team fixed small bird	25	1st place, gold medalist(s)
Alphonse Allaert; Edmond De Knibber; Jérome De Maeyer; Louis Delcon; Louis Fierens; Louis Van Beeck; Hubert Van Innis; Pierre Van Thielt	Team moving bird, 50 m	2701	1st place, gold medalist(s)
Alphonse Allaert; Edmond De Knibber; Jérome De Maeyer; Louis Delcon; Louis Fierens; Louis Van Beeck; Hubert Van Innis; Pierre Van Thielt	Team moving bird, 33 m	2958	1st place, gold medalist(s)
Alphonse Allaert; Edmond De Knibber; Jérome De Maeyer; Louis Delcon; Louis Fierens; Louis Van Beeck; Hubert Van Innis; Pierre Van Thielt	Team moving bird, 28 m	2924	2nd place, silver medalist(s)

== Aquatics ==
=== Diving ===
Three divers represented Belgium in 1920. It was the nation's second appearance in the sport. Sauvage became the first Belgian to advance to a diving final, in the plain high diving. He placed seventh in the final standings.

Men

Ranks given are within the semifinal group.

Diver	Event	Semifinals			Final		
Diver	Event	Points	Score	Rank	Points	Score	Rank
Joseph Callens	10 m springboard	30	476.40	6	Did not advance		
Raymond Desonay	Plain high dive	35	129.0	7	Did not advance		
Fernand Sauvage	Plain high dive	17	145.5	3 Q	34	148.5	7

=== Swimming ===
Twelve swimmers, including one woman, represented Belgium in 1920. It was the nation's fourth appearance in the sport as well as the Olympics. Blitz was the first Belgian to reach a final in an Olympic swimming event, and he won the nation's first Olympic swimming medal with his bronze-winning effort in the 100 metre backstroke.

Ranks given are within the heat.

Men

Swimmer	Event	Quarterfinals		Semifinals		Final	
Swimmer	Event	Result	Rank	Result	Rank	Result	Rank
Gérard Blitz	100 m free	Unknown	7	Did not advance			
Gérard Blitz	100 m back	NA		1:18.6	2 Q	1:19.0	3rd place, bronze medalist(s)
Félicien Courbet	200 m breast	Unknown	7	Did not advance			
Félicien Courbet	400 m breast	7:20.0	3	Did not advance			
Paul De Backer	1500 m free	26:46.4	2 Q	Unknown	6	Did not advance	
Édouard Henry	200 m breast	3:18.0	3	Did not advance			
Édouard Henry	400 m breast	Unknown	5	Did not advance			
Gaspard Lemaire	100 m back	NA		1:28.0	3	Did not advance	
Paul Neeckx	200 m breast	3:16.6	3 q	Unknown	5	Did not advance	
Édouard Van Haelen	200 m breast	3:22.6	3	Did not advance			
Édouard Van Haelen	400 m breast	Unknown	4	Did not advance			
Martial van Schelle	100 m free	Unknown	4	Did not advance			
René Bauwens; Gérard Blitz; Joseph Cludts; Jean-Pierre Vermetten	4 × 200 m free relay	N/A		11:12.2	3	Did not advance	

Women

Swimmer	Event	Semifinals		Final	
Swimmer	Event	Result	Rank	Result	Rank
Germaine Van Dievoet	100 m free	Unknown	4	Did not advance	

=== Water polo ===
Belgium competed in the Olympic water polo tournament for the fourth time in 1920, having won a medal each of the prior times but still seeking its first gold medal. The Bergvall System was in use at the time. Belgium blew out Switzerland in the opening round, then squeaked by the Netherlands in the quarterfinals. After defeating Sweden 5–3 in the semifinals, Belgium advanced to the final against Great Britain. For the fourth straight time the two had met in the Olympics, the British side came out on top of the Belgian team, this time by a score of 3–2.

Belgium received a bye into the silver medal semifinals after the loss to Britain. There they faced, and defeated, the United States to take the country's fourth Olympic water polo medal.

Round of 16

Belgium	11–0	Switzerland	Antwerp

Quarterfinals

Belgium	2–1	Netherlands	Antwerp

Semifinals

Belgium	5–3	Sweden	Antwerp

Final

Great Britain	3–2	Belgium	Antwerp

Silver medal match

United States	2–7	Belgium	Antwerp

Final rank
(silver) Silver

== Athletics ==
42 athletes represented Belgium in 1920. It was the host nation's third appearance in the sport, having not competed in athletics in 1900. The best result for the team was Broos's fourth-place finish in the marathon as the Belgians continued to look in vain for their first Olympic medal in the sport.

Ranks given are within the heat.

Athlete	Event	Heats		Quarterfinals		Semifinals		Final	
Athlete	Event	Result	Rank	Result	Rank	Result	Rank	Result	Rank
Lucien Bangels	1500 m	—N/a				Did not finish		Did not advance	
Oscar Blansaer	Marathon	—N/a						3:20:00.0	34
Paul Brochart	100 m	11.4	1 Q	10.9	2 Q	11.3	4	Did not advance	
Paul Brochart	200 m	23.2	1 Q	23.2	2 Q	Did not start		Did not advance	
Auguste Broos	Marathon	—N/a						2:39:25.8	4
Omar Corteyn	400 m	52.2	1 Q	52.0	5	Did not advance			
Jean Delarge	800 m	—N/a		Did not finish		Did not advance			
Pierre Devaux	10000 m	—N/a				36:38.3	8	Did not advance	
Antoine Doyen	10 km walk	—N/a					6 Q	56:30.0	8
Léon Fourneau	1500 m	—N/a				4:15.0	3 Q	4:16.0	9
Henri Godin	800 m	—N/a			6	Did not advance			
Marcel Gustin	100 m	11.3	3	Did not advance					
Marcel Gustin	200 m	24.3	3	Did not advance					
Max Houben	200 m	24.2	2 Q		5	Did not advance			
René Joannes-Powell	110 m hurdles	—N/a			4	Did not advance			
Jean Lefèbvre	100 m		5	Did not advance					
Julien Lehouck	100 m		4	Did not advance					
Charles Melis	Marathon	—N/a						3:00:51.0	27
Jules Migeot	400 m	55.1	4	Did not advance					
François Morren	400 m	51.6	1 Q	50.8	4	Did not advance			
Léonce Oleffe	800 m	—N/a			7	Did not advance			
Aimé Proot	10000 m	—N/a					9	Did not advance	
Aimé Proot	Cross country	—N/a							36
Émile Rivez	Cross country	—N/a							42
Theofiel Roekaert	1500 m	—N/a					7	Did not advance	
Jean Seghers	3 km walk	—N/a				14:09.2	6 Q	13:31.1	9
Jean Seghers	10 km walk	—N/a				48:29.0	6 Q	50:32.4	7
Omar Smet	400 m hurdles	—N/a		Did not finish		Did not advance			
Henri Smets	5000 m	—N/a					8	Did not advance	
Henri Smets	Cross country	—N/a							33
Pierre Trullemans	5000 m	—N/a				Did not finish		Did not advance	
Pierre Trullemans	Cross country	—N/a							41
Julien Van Campenhout	5000 m	—N/a				15:22.6	2 Q	15:25.0	9
Julien Van Campenhout	Cross country	—N/a						28:00.0	7
Joseph Van Der Wee	800 m	—N/a		2:00.0	5	Did not advance			
Désiré Van Remortel	Marathon	—N/a						Did not finish	
Paul Verlaeckt	3 km walk	—N/a					7	Did not advance	
Paul Verlaeckt	10 km walk	—N/a				Disqualified		Did not advance	
François Vyncke	5000 m	—N/a					7	Did not advance	
François Vyncke	Cross country	—N/a							37
Charles Wiggers	3 km walk	—N/a					9	Did not advance	
Charles Wiggers	10 km walk	—N/a				Disqualified		Did not advance	
Paul Brochart; Max Houben; Julien Lehouck; Omer Smet	4 × 100 m relay	—N/a				43.7	4	Did not advance	
Omar Corteyn; Jules Migeot; François Morren; Omar Smet	4 × 400 m relay	—N/a				3:38.8	1 Q	3:24.9	6
Lucien Bangels; Claude Otterbeen; Henri Smets; Pierre Trullemans; Julien Van Campenhout; François Vyncke	3000 m team	—N/a				30	4	Did not advance	
Aimé Proot; Émile Rivez; Henri Smets; Pierre Trullemans; Julien Van Campenhout; François Vyncke	Team cross country	—N/a						48	6

Athlete	Event	Qualifying		Final	
Athlete	Event	Result	Rank	Result	Rank
Gustave De Bruyne	Long jump	6.20	18	Did not advance	
Arthur Delaender	Discus throw	32.00	16	Did not advance	
Arthur Delaender	Javelin throw	36.25	25	Did not advance	
Adolphe Hauman	Javelin throw	42.58	18	Did not advance	
Jean Hénault	High jump	1.65	16	Did not advance	
Albert Harion	High jump	1.70	14	Did not advance	
René Joannes-Powell	Pole vault	3.60	1 Q	3.30	13
Jean Lefèvbre	Long jump	5.79	24	Did not advance	
Jean Lefèvbre	Javelin throw	39.00	22	Did not advance	
Julien Lehouck	Long jump	5.76	25	Did not advance	
François Mahy	High jump	1.65	16	Did not advance	
Émile Muller	Javelin throw	40.24	20	Did not advance	
Léon Pothier	Shot put	10.10	24	Did not advance	
Gaston Wuyts	Shot put	11.045	18	Did not advance	

Athlete	Event	Final	
Athlete	Event	Result	Rank
René Joannes-Powell	Decathlon	5091.520	11

== Boxing ==
13 boxers represented Belgium at the 1920 Games. It was the nation's debut appearance in boxing. Hébrans was the only boxer to advance to the semifinals; he was defeated both in the semifinals and in the bronze medal match to finish with fourth place in the bantamweight.

Boxer	Weight class	Round of 32	Round of 16	Quarterfinals	Semifinals	Final / Bronze match	
Boxer	Weight class	Opposition Score	Opposition Score	Opposition Score	Opposition Score	Opposition Score	Rank
Jules Androt	Flyweight	N/A	Zivic (USA); L	Did not advance			9
Philippe Bouvy	Featherweight	Bye	Hesterman (NED); W	Gachet (FRA); L	Did not advance		5
Alfons Bouwens	Bantamweight	N/A	Walker (RSA); L	Did not advance			9
Joseph Charpentier	Flyweight	N/A	Kjellberg (NOR); W	Albert (FRA); L	Did not advance		5
Jean Creusen	Heavyweight	N/A	Bye	Spengler (USA); L	Did not advance		5
René Smet	Welterweight	Bye	Suhr (DEN); L	Did not advance			9
Henri Hébrans	Bantamweight	N/A	Bye	Vogel (USA); W	Graham (CAN); L	McKenzie (GBR); L	4
Antoine Masson	Middleweight	Bye	Prud'Homme (CAN); L	Did not advance			9
Jean Neys	Lightweight	N/A	Johansen (DEN); L	Did not advance			9
Joseph Simonon	Middleweight	Dortet (FRA); L	Did not advance				17
Julien Van Muysen	Lightweight	N/A	Giunchi (ITA); W	Beland (RSA); L	Did not advance		5
Joseph Vincken	Featherweight	Bye	Garzena (ITA); L	Did not advance			9
Georges Werll	Welterweight	Bye	Clark (USA); L	Did not advance			9

Opponent nation	Wins	Losses	Percent
Canada	0	2	.000
Denmark	0	2	.000
France	0	3	.000
Great Britain	0	1	.000
Italy	1	1	.500
Netherlands	1	0	1.000
Norway	1	0	1.000
South Africa	0	2	.000
United States	1	2	.333
Total	4	13	.235

Round	Wins	Losses	Percent
Round of 32	0	1	.000
Round of 16	3	7	.300
Quarterfinals	1	4	.200
Semifinals	0	1	.000
Final	0	0	–
Bronze match	0	1	.000
Total	4	13	.235

== Cycling ==
15 cyclists represented Belgium in 1920. It was the nation's fourth appearance in the sport, with Belgium having competed in cycling each time the nation appeared at the Olympics. George took the country's first Olympic cycling gold medal by winning the 50 kilometre race. The road cycling team took bronze; Belgian cyclists came close to adding more medals with two fourth-place finishes and one fifth-place finish.

=== Road cycling ===
Cyclist	Event	Final	
Cyclist	Event	Result	Rank
Albert de Bunné	Time trial	4:45:23.4	5
Bernard Janssens	Time trial	4:44:20.6	4
André Vercruysse	Time trial	4:55:41.4	15
Albert Wyckmans	Time trial	5:03:19.0	24
Albert de Bunné; Bernard Janssens; André Vercruysse; Albert Wyckmans	Team time trial	19:28:44.4	3rd place, bronze medalist(s)

=== Track cycling ===
Ranks given are within the heat.

Cyclist	Event	Heats		Quarterfinals		Repechage semis		Repechage final		Semifinals		Final	
Cyclist	Event	Result	Rank	Result	Rank	Result	Rank	Result	Rank	Result	Rank	Result	Rank
Binard	Sprint	Unknown	2 Q	Unknown	3 R	Unknown	3	Did not advance					
Charles Cadron	50 km	N/A										Unknown	8
Gustave Daghelinckx	Sprint	13.2	1 Q	Unknown	3 R	Unknown	2	Did not advance					
Gustave de Schryver	50 km	N/A										Unknown	8
Félix Dockx	50 km	N/A										Did not finish	
Henry George	50 km	N/A										1:16:42.3	1st place, gold medalist(s)
L'Empereur	Sprint	Unknown	2 Q	Unknown	3 R	Unknown	2	Did not advance					
John Verhoeven	Sprint	13.2	1 Q	Unknown	3 R	Unknown	3	Did not advance					
Frédéric Claessens; Frans Verscheuren	Tandem	N/A		Did not finish		N/A				Did not advance			
Gustave Daghelinckx; John Verhoeven	Tandem	N/A		Unknown	2	N/A				Did not advance			
Gustave Daghelinckx; Albert de Bunné; Gustave de Schryver; Bernard Janssens; Charles Van Doorslaer	Team pursuit	N/A		6:18.4	1 Q'	N/A				5:20.2	2	Did not advance	4

== Equestrian ==
Eighteen equestrians represented Belgium in 1920. It was the host nation's third appearance in the sport, being one of only three countries (along with France and the United States) to have taken part in each Olympic equestrian competition to that point. The Belgian vaulters were the most successful, with Bouckaert's gold medal and Finet's bronze in the individual leading the team to a gold medal in the combined event. The Belgians also had success in the other two competitions, adding a silver in the jumping and a bronze in the eventing, though no others took individual medals.

Equestrian	Horse	Event	Final	
Equestrian	Horse	Event	Result	Rank
Jules Bonvalet	Weppelghem	Eventing	1392.50	12
Jules Bonvalet	Weppelghem	Jumping	10.00	15
Daniel Bouckaert		Vaulting	30.500	1st place, gold medalist(s)
Victor Claes		Vaulting	26.163	8
Emmanuel de Blommaert	Grizzly	Dressage	20.4375	11
Ghislain de Briey	Perfect Gentleman	Jumping	13.50	21
Ferdinand de la Serna	Arsinoe	Jumping	6.00	5
Gaston de Trannoy	Bouton d'Or	Dressage	23.1250	7
Louis Finet		Vaulting	29.000	3rd place, bronze medalist(s)
Oswald Lints	Martha	Eventing	1515.00	10
Jacques Misonne	Gaucho	Eventing	1282.50	17
Jacques Misonne	Gaucho	Jumping	23.25	25
Roger Moeremans d'Emaüs	Sweet Girl	Eventing	1652.50	4
Roger Moeremans d'Emaüs	Sweet Girl	Jumping	7.00	7
Albert van Cauwenberg		Vaulting	26.666	6
Maurice Van Ranst		Vaulting	28.000	4
van Schauwenbroeck		Vaulting	27.250	5
Daniel Bouckaert; Louis Finet; Maurice Van Ranst		Team vaulting	87.500	1st place, gold medalist(s)
Jules Bonvalet; Oswald Lints; Jacques Misonne; Roger Moeremans d'Emaüs	Weppelghem; Martha; Gaucho; Sweet Girl	Team eventing	4560.00	3rd place, bronze medalist(s)
André Coumans; Herman de Gaiffier d'Hestroy; Herman d'Oultromont; Henri Laame	Lisette; Miss; Lord Kitchener; Biscuit	Team jumping	16.25	2nd place, silver medalist(s)

== Fencing ==
Twenty-two fencers represented Belgium in 1920. It was the host nation's fourth appearance in the sport, having competed in fencing each time Belgium appeared at the Olympics. The best result for the team was a silver medal in the team épée, which was the country's only fencing medal despite having six individual finalists and two teams in event finals.

Ranks given are within the group.

Athlete	Event	First round		Quarterfinals		Semifinals		Final	
Athlete	Event	Result	Rank	Result	Rank	Result	Rank	Result	Rank
Marcel Berré	Foil	N/A		2–4	4	Did not advance			
Victor Boin	Épée	4–2	3 Q	3–7	8	Did not advance			
Charles Crahay	Foil	N/A		3–1	2 Q	2–3	4	Did not advance	
Modeste Cuypers	Foil	N/A		6–2	2 Q	2–3	4	Did not advance	
Joseph de Craecker	Épée	4–4	3 Q	5–5	7	Did not advance			
Fernand de Montigny	Épée	7–1	1 Q	6–4	3 Q	4–7	7	Did not advance	
Fernand de Montigny	Foil	N/A		5–0	1 Q	4–1	1 Q	6–5	6
Robert de Schepper	Foil	N/A		3–2	3 Q	1–4	5	Did not advance	
Maurice Dewee	Épée	4–3	2 Q	6–5	3 Q	3–8	10	Did not advance	
Charles Delporte	Épée	6–2	1 Q	5–5	6 Q	4–7	5 Q	3–8	10
Eugène Dufrane	Foil	N/A		3–3	4	Did not advance			
Robert Feyerick	Sabre	N/A		3–3	2 Q	3–3	5	Did not advance	
Ernest Gevers	Épée	4–5	4 Q	6–5	3 Q	7–4	1 Q	6–5	4
Félix Goblet	Épée	8–1	1 Q	5–3	5 Q	6–5	2 Q	3–8	10
Félix Goblet	Sabre	N/A		4–3	3 Q	0–6	7	Did not advance	
Robert Hennet	Sabre	N/A		5–3	2 Q	3–3	4 Q	5–6	7
Albert Pape	Foil	N/A		3–5	6	Did not advance			
Alexandre Simonson	Sabre	N/A		1–6	7	Did not advance			
Léon Tom	Épée	2–5	7	Did not advance					
Léon Tom	Sabre	N/A		6–1	1 Q	4–2	2 Q	5–6	6
Jean Verbrugge	Foil	N/A		5–1	2 Q	1–4	5	Did not advance	
Pierre Calle; Charles Delporte; Harry Bombeeck; Robert Feyerick; Robert Hennet; Alexandre Simonson; Léon Tom	Team sabre	N/A						4–3	4
Marcel Berré; Charles Crahay; Modeste Cuypers; Fernand de Montigny; Émile de Schepper; Robert Hennet; Albert Pape; Léon Tom	Team foil	N/A				1–4	4	Did not advance	
Paul Anspach; Victor Boin; Joseph de Craecker; Fernand de Montigny; Maurice de Wee; Ernest Gevers; Félix Goblet; Philippe le Hardy; Léon Tom	Team épée	N/A				4–1	1 Q	4–1	2nd place, silver medalist(s)

== Field hockey ==
Belgium competed in field hockey for the first time. The team took third place in the four-team round robin, defeating France but losing to Great Britain and Denmark.

Team	Event	Final	
Team	Event	Result	Rank
Belgium national field hockey team	Field hockey	1–2	3rd place, bronze medalist(s)

== Football ==
Belgium competed in the Olympic football tournament for the second time, winning the gold medal. The Belgians, which had taken bronze in 1900, won the 1920 championship without much difficulty. The squad outscored opponents 8 to 1, including holding a 2–0 lead when Czechoslovakia withdrew from the final in protest in the 40th minute.

Quarterfinals

August 29, 1920

Belgium	3–1	Spain
Coppée 11' 52' 55'	Report	Arrate 62' (pen.)

Olympisch Stadion, Antwerp
Attendance: 18,000
Referee: Johannes Mutters (NED)

Semifinals

August 31, 1920

Belgium	3–0	Netherlands
Larnoe 46'; Van Hege 55'; Bragard 85'	Report

Olympisch Stadion, Antwerp
Attendance: 22,000
Referee: John Lewis (GBR)

Final

September 2, 1920

Belgium	2–0	Czechoslovakia
Coppée 6' (pen.); Larnoe 30'	Report

Olympisch Stadion, Antwerp
Attendance: 35,000
Referee: John Lewis (GBR)

Final rank
Gold

== Gymnastics ==
Forty-eight gymnasts represented Belgium in 1920. It was the host nation's third appearance in the sport. Kempeneers had the best individual performance, finishing fourth. Belgium also sent teams in two of the three team events, winning a silver medal and a bronze.

=== Artistic gymnastics ===
Gymnast	Event	Final	
Gymnast	Event	Result	Rank
François Gibens	All-around	83.08	11
Félicien Kempeneers	All-around	86.25	4
Charles Lannie	All-around	78.95	19
François Verboven	All-around	80.42	17
Julianus Wagemans	All-around	83.58	9
Eugenius Auwerkerken; Théophile Bauer; François Claessens; Augustus Cootmans; Frans Gibens; Albert Haepers; Domien Jacob; Félicien Kempeneers; Jules Labéeu; Hubert Lafortune; Auguste Landrieu; Charles Lannie; Constant Loriot; Nicolaas Moerloos; Ferdinand Minnaert; Louis Stoop; Jean Van Guysse; Alphonse Van Mele; François Verboven; Jean Verboven; Julien Verdonck; Joseph Verstraeten; Georges Vivex; Julianus Wagemans	Team	346.765	2nd place, silver medalist(s)
Paul Arets; Léon Bronckaert; Léopold Clabots; Jean Baptiste Claessens; Léon Darrien; Lucien Dehoux; Ernest Deleu; Emil Duboisson; Ernest Dureuil; Joseph Fiems; Marcel Hansen; Louis Henin; Omer Hoffman; Félix Logiest; Charles Marschaelcke; René Paenhuysen; Arnold Pierret; René Pinchart; Gaspar Pirotte; Augusten Pluys; Léopold Son; Edouard Taeymans; Pierre Thitiar; Henri Verhavert	Team, Swedish system	1094.000	3rd place, bronze medalist(s)

== Ice hockey ==
The host nation competed in the inaugural Olympic ice hockey tournament. The team was eliminated in the quarterfinals by Sweden.

Roster

Coach: (Belgium) Paul Loicq

Pos	Player	GP	G	Birthdate	Age
F	Maurice Deprez	1	0	1886	~34
R	Paul Goeminne	1	0	1888	~32
F	Jean-Maurice Goossens	1	0	January 16, 1892	28
F	Paul Loicq	1	0	August 11, 1888	31
D	Philippe Van Volckxsom	1	0	May 1, 1889	21
D	Gaston Van Volxem	1	0	1893	~27
G	François Vergult	1	0	April 21, 1891	29
G	François Franck	0	–	September 14, 1904	15

Gold Medal quarterfinals

23 April 1920; 21:30	Sweden	8 – 0 (5–0, 3–0)	Belgium	Palais de Glace d'Anvers

Game reference

Seth Howander
Goalies
François Vergult
Referee:
(Canada) W. A. Hewitt

Burman	1 – 0
Johansson	2 – 0
Burman	3 – 0
Lindqvist	4 – 0
Burman	5 – 0
Johansson	6 – 0
Molander	7 – 0
Lindqvist	8 – 0

12 min
Penalties
6 min

Final rank
5th (Tied)

== Polo ==
Belgium competed in the Olympic polo tournament for the first time, taking fourth and last place. The Belgians lost to Great Britain in the semifinals and to the United States in the bronze medal match. Alfred Grisar, Maurice Lysen, Clément Van Der Straeten and Gaston Peers de Nieuwburgh took part in the tournament.

Semifinals

Great Britain	8–3	Belgium

Bronze medal match

United States	11–3	Belgium

Final rank
4th

== Rowing ==
Twenty rowers represented Belgium in 1920. It was the host nation's fourth appearance in the sport. None of the team's five boats were able to advance past the first round in its event.

Ranks given are within the heat.

Rower	Cox	Event	Quarterfinals		Semifinals		Final	
Rower	Cox	Event	Result	Rank	Result	Rank	Result	Rank
Jacques Haller	N/A	Single sculls	Unknown	3	Did not advance			
Georges Léonet; Ernest Sadzawka	N/A	Double sculls	N/A		7:34.8	2	Did not advance	
Georges Van Den Bossche; Oscar Van Den Bossche	René Van Damme	Coxed pair	N/A		8:25.0	2	Did not advance	
Adrien D'Hondt; Robert Demulder; Jean Van Silfhout; Léon Vleurinck	Raphael de Ligne	Coxed four	N/A		7:40.0	2	Did not advance	
Daniël Clarembaux; Julien Crickx; Gustave De Mulder; Jozef Hermans; Charles Lalemand; Maurice Requillé; René Smet; Félix Taymans	Joseph Crickx	Eight	6:40.0	2	Did not advance			

== Sailing ==
Fourteen sailors represented Belgium in 1920. It was the host nation's second appearance in the sport. Belgium had the dubious distinction of having the only boat to not win a medal—there was only one event in which more than three boats entered, and the two Belgian boats in that event finished first and fourth. The other two Belgian boats earned a silver and a bronze.

Sailors	Class	Race 1		Race 2		Race 3		Total	
Sailors	Class	Result	Rank	Result	Rank	Result	Rank	Score	Rank
Raymond Bauwens; Louis Depière; Willy Valcke	6 metre (1907)	Unknown							4
Frédéric Bruynseels; Emile Cornellie; Florimond Cornellie	6 metre (1907)	Unknown							1st place, gold medalist(s)
Léon Huybrechts; John Klotz; Charles van den Bussche	6 metre (1919)	Unknown							2nd place, silver medalist(s)
Willy de l'Arbre; Albert Grisar; Georges Hellebuyck; Léopold Standaert; Henri Weewauters	8 metre (1919)	Unknown							3rd place, bronze medalist(s)

== Skating ==
=== Figure skating ===
Two figure skaters represented Belgium in 1920. It was the host nation's debut appearance in the sport. The pair finished in sixth place out of eight pairs.

Skater	Event	Final	
Skater	Event	Result	Rank
Georgette Herbos; Georges Wagemans	Pairs	41.5	6

== Shooting ==
Twenty-four shooters represented Belgium in 1920. It was the host nation's third appearance in the sport. J. Haller and G. Sylva also competed, but in which events is unknown. In addition, five unknown Belgian shooters competed. Belgium finished with a lone medal, the silver in the team clay pigeons competition.

Shooter	Event	Final	
Shooter	Event	Result	Rank
Conrad Adriaenssens	300 m free rifle, 3 pos.	Unknown	
Louis Andrieu	50 m small-bore rifle	Unknown	
Arthur Balbaert	300 m free rifle, 3 pos.	Unknown	
Albert Bosquet	Trap	84	9
Philippe Cammaerts	50 m small-bore rifle	Unknown	
Émile Dupont	Trap	84	9
Joseph Haesaerts	300 m free rifle, 3 pos.	Unknown	
François Heyens	300 m free rifle, 3 pos.	Unknown	
Joseph Janssens	300 m military rifle, standing	54	5
Henri Quersin	Trap	85	7
Victor Robert	50 m small-bore rifle	Unknown	
Paul Van Asbroeck	50 m free pistol	466	7
Paul Van Asbroeck	50 m small-bore rifle	Unknown	
Paul Van Asbroeck	300 m free rifle, 3 pos.	Unknown	
Norbert Van Molle	50 m small-bore rifle	Unknown	
Conrad Andriaenssens; Arthur Balbaert; François Ceulemans; Joseph Haesaerts; Paul Van Asbroeck	600 m team military rifle, prone	264	10
Conrad Andriaenssens; Arthur Balbaert; François Ceulemans; Joseph Haesaerts; Paul Van Asbroeck	300 & 600 m team military rifle, prone	469	14
Conrad Andriaenssens; Arthur Balbaert; Joseph Haesaerts; François Heyens; Paul Van Asbroeck	50 m team free pistol	2229	5
Conrad Andriaenssens; Arthur Balbaert; Joseph Haesaerts; François Heyens; Paul Van Asbroeck	Team free rifle	3939	12
Conrad Andriaenssens; Joseph Janssens; Vincent Libert; Louis Ryskens; Paul Van Asbroeck	300 m team military rifle, prone	264	14
Conrad Andriaenssens; Joseph Janssens; Vincent Libert; Louis Ryskens; Paul Van Asbroeck	300 m team military rifle, standing	217	12
Louis Andrieu; Philippe Cammaerts; Victor Robert; Paul Van Asbroeck; Norbert Van Molle	50 m team small-bore rifle	1785	6
Robert Andrieux; Jules Bastin; Philippe Cammaerts; Léon De Coster; Paul Van Asbroeck; Norbert Van Molle	30 m team military pistol	1221	7
Albert Bosquet; Joseph Cogels; Émile Dupont; Edouard Fesinger; Henri Quersin; Louis Van Tilt	Team clay pigeons	503	2nd place, silver medalist(s)

== Tug of war ==
Belgium competed in the Olympic tug of war tournament for the first time in 1920, the final appearance of the sport in the Olympics. The Bergvall System was used. Losing their first match to Great Britain eliminated the Belgians from the gold medal tournament, but a win against the United States set them opposite the Netherlands for the silver medal. Belgium lost this match and was relegated to the bronze medal tournament; there, they again faced and again defeated the Americans to take the bronze.

All matches were best-of-three pulls.

Semifinals

Great Britain	2–0	Belgium

Silver medal semifinals

Belgium	2–0	United States

Silver medal match

Belgium	0–2	Netherlands

Bronze medal match

United States	0–2	Belgium

Final rank
(bronze) Bronze

== Weightlifting ==
Seven weightlifters represented Belgium in 1920. It was the host nation's debut appearance in the sport. Three of the Belgians took medals, one of each type, with François de Haes taking the top spot in the featherweight category.

Weightlifter	Weight class	Final	
Weightlifter	Weight class	Result	Rank
François de Haes	60 kg	220.0	1st place, gold medalist(s)
Louis De Haes	60 kg	190.0	7
Georges de Proft	75 kg	Did not finish	
Marcel Marchand	75 kg	205.0	7
Georges Rooms	67.5 kg	230.0	3rd place, bronze medalist(s)
Lionel van den Roye	82.5 kg	227.5	8
Louis Williquet	67.5 kg	240.0	2nd place, silver medalist(s)

== Wrestling ==
Twelve wrestlers competed for Belgium in 1920. It was the nation's third appearance in the sport. None of the Belgians won medals, though twice a wrestler was defeated in the bronze medal match. Two of the wrestlers competed in both Greco-Roman and freestyle wrestling.

=== Freestyle ===
Wrestler	Event	Round of 32	Round of 16	Quarterfinals	Semifinals	Finals / Bronze match	Rank
Pierre Derkinderen	Freestyle middle	Bye	Rahmy (EGY) (W)	Penttala (FIN) (L)	Did not advance		5
Frits Janssens	Freestyle middle	Bye	Angelot (FRA) (W)	Leino (FIN) (L)	Did not advance		5
Hyacinthe Roosen	Freestyle light heavy	N/A	Gallén (FIN) (L)	Did not advance			9
Henri Snoeck	Freestyle light heavy	N/A	van Rensburg (RSA) (L)	Did not advance			9
August Thys	Freestyle light	N/A	Bye	Bye	Anttila (FIN) (L)	Wright (GBR) (L)	4

Opponent nation	Wins	Losses	Percent
Egypt	1	0	1.000
Finland	0	4	.000
France	1	0	1.000
Great Britain	0	1	.000
South Africa	0	1	.000
Total	2	6	.250

Round	Wins	Losses	Percent
Round of 32	0	0	–
Round of 16	2	2	.500
Quarterfinals	0	2	.000
Semifinals	0	1	.000
Final	0	0	–
Bronze match	0	1	.000
Total	2	6	.250

=== Greco-Roman ===
Wrestler	Event	Round of 32	Round of 16	Quarterfinals	Semifinals	Finals	Rank
Wrestler	Event	Round of 32	Round of 16	Silver quarters	Silver semis	Silver match	Rank
Wrestler	Event	Round of 32	Round of 16	Bronze quarters	Bronze semis	Bronze match	Rank
Alexandre Boumans	Greco-Roman feather	Roels (NED) (W)	Vaglio (ITA) (W)	Porro (ITA) (W)	Friman (FIN) (L)	Did not advance	5
Alexandre Boumans	Greco-Roman feather	Roels (NED) (W)	Vaglio (ITA) (W)	N/A	Gallery (USA) (W)	Kähkönen (FIN) (L)	5
Alexandre Boumans	Greco-Roman feather	Roels (NED) (W)	Vaglio (ITA) (W)	Bye	Svensson (SWE) (L)	Did not advance	5
Oscar Cornelis	Greco-Roman middle	Perttilä (FIN) (L)	Did not advance	Did not advance			19
Oscar Cornelis	Greco-Roman middle	Perttilä (FIN) (L)	Did not advance	Did not advance			19
Oscar Cornelis	Greco-Roman middle	Perttilä (FIN) (L)	Did not advance	Did not advance			19
Henri Dierickx	Greco-Roman feather	Pütsep (EST) (L)	Did not advance	Did not advance			17
Henri Dierickx	Greco-Roman feather	Pütsep (EST) (L)	Did not advance	Did not advance			17
Henri Dierickx	Greco-Roman feather	Pütsep (EST) (L)	Did not advance	Did not advance			17
Frits Janssens	Greco-Roman light	Bye	Swigart (USA) (W)	Väre (FIN) (L)	Did not advance		4
Frits Janssens	Greco-Roman light	Bye	Swigart (USA) (W)	Christiansen (DEN) (W)	Tamminen (FIN) (L)	Did not advance	4
Frits Janssens	Greco-Roman light	Bye	Swigart (USA) (W)	Bye	Frydenlund (NOR) (W)	Andersen (NOR) (L)	4
Albert Savonet	Greco-Roman light	Bye	Frisenfeldt (DEN) (L)	Did not advance			12
Albert Savonet	Greco-Roman light	Bye	Frisenfeldt (DEN) (L)	Did not advance			12
Albert Savonet	Greco-Roman light	Bye	Frisenfeldt (DEN) (L)	Did not advance			12
Henri Snoeck	Greco-Roman light heavy	Bye	Kocián (TCH) (W)	Sint (NED) (L)	Did not advance		7
Henri Snoeck	Greco-Roman light heavy	Bye	Kocián (TCH) (W)	N/A	Did not advance		7
Henri Snoeck	Greco-Roman light heavy	Bye	Kocián (TCH) (W)	N/A			7
Maurice Vanderleenden	Greco-Roman middle	Bye	Zanoline (USA) (W)	Westergren (SWE) (L)	Did not advance		9
Maurice Vanderleenden	Greco-Roman middle	Bye	Zanoline (USA) (W)	Dechmann (LUX) (W)	Perttilä (FIN) (L)	Did not advance	9
Maurice Vanderleenden	Greco-Roman middle	Bye	Zanoline (USA) (W)	Did not advance			9
Eduard van den Bril	Greco-Roman heavy	Bye	Nilsson (SWE) (L)	Did not advance			12
Eduard van den Bril	Greco-Roman heavy	Bye	Nilsson (SWE) (L)	Did not advance			12
Eduard van den Bril	Greco-Roman heavy	Bye	Nilsson (SWE) (L)	N/A			12
Emile Wahlem	Greco-Roman light heavy	Bye	Cardinale (ITA) (W)	Rajala (FIN) (W)	Sint (NED) (L)	Did not advance	6
Emile Wahlem	Greco-Roman light heavy	Bye	Cardinale (ITA) (W)	N/A	Did not advance		6
Emile Wahlem	Greco-Roman light heavy	Bye	Cardinale (ITA) (W)	N/A			6

Opponent nation	Wins	Losses	Percent
Czechoslovakia	1	0	1.000
Denmark	1	1	.500
Estonia	0	1	.000
Finland	1	6	.143
Italy	3	0	1.000
Luxembourg	1	0	1.000
Netherlands	1	2	.333
Norway	1	1	.500
Sweden	0	3	.000
United States	3	0	1.000
Total	12	14	.462

Round	Wins	Losses	Percent
Round of 32	1	2	.333
Round of 16	5	2	.714
Quarterfinals	2	3	.400
Semifinals	0	2	.000
Final	0	0	–
Silver quarterfinals	2	0	1.000
Silver semifinals	1	2	.333
Silver match	0	1	.000
Bronze quarterfinals	0	0	–
Bronze semifinals	1	1	.500
Bronze match	0	1	.000
Total	12	14	.462
