= Archery at the 1920 Summer Olympics – Individual fixed small bird =

Archery at the Olympics

Men's fixed small bird at the Games of the VII Olympiad
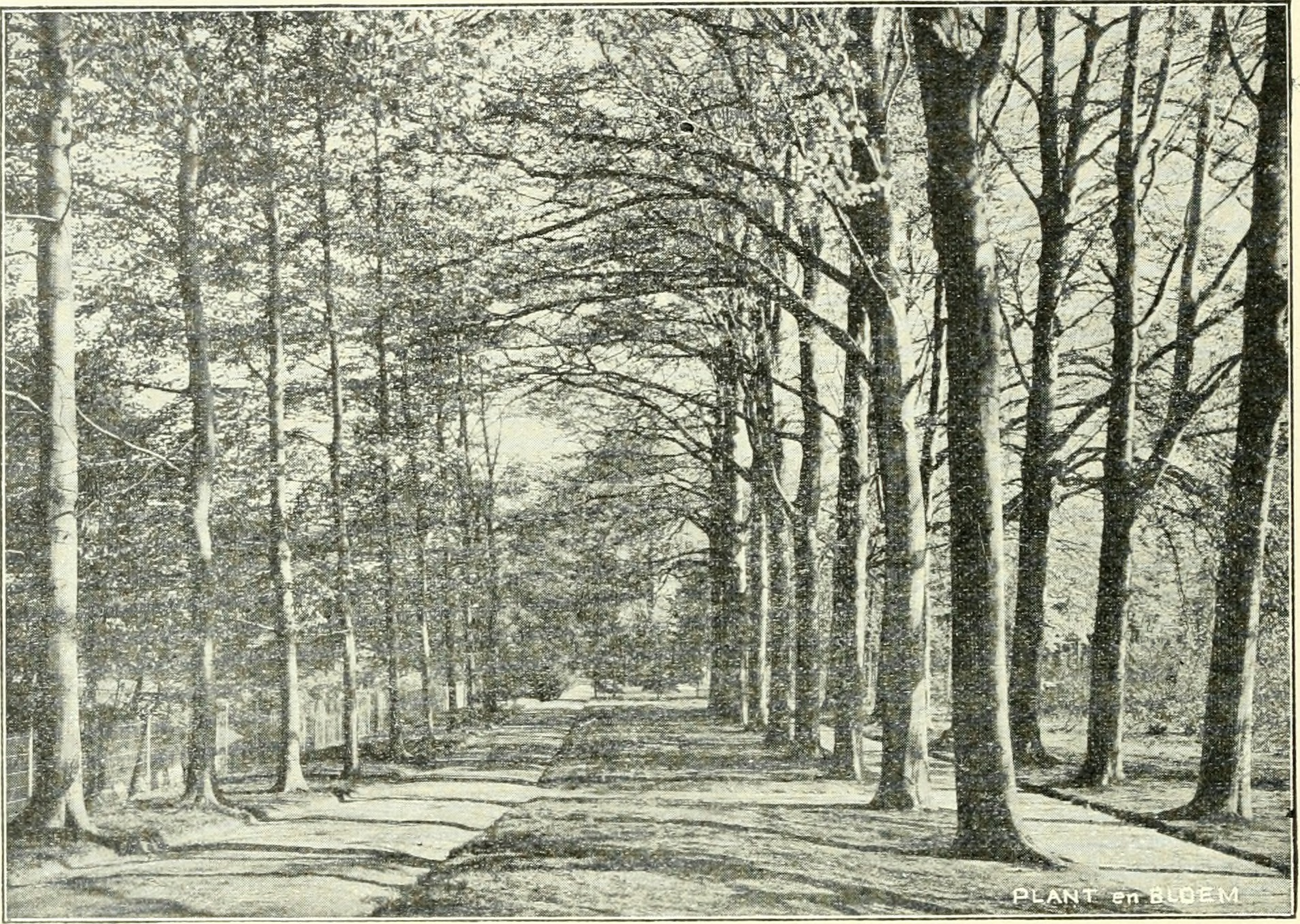
- Contemporary photograph of Nachtegalen Park, where the event took place
- Venue: Nachtegalen Park
- Date: 3 August
- Competitors: 6 from 1 nation

Medalists
1st place, gold medalist(s)		Edmond van Moer	Belgium
2nd place, silver medalist(s)		Louis van de Perck	Belgium
3rd place, bronze medalist(s)		Joseph Hermans	Belgium

The individual fixed small bird event was part of the archery programme at the 1920 Summer Olympics. The event, like all other archery events in 1920, was open only to men. Six archers, all from Belgium, competed.

Two events, an individual and a team event, were contested. Each archer shot only once, with individual scores being summed to give a team score. The top three scores for each team were used to determine placings, though all six members of the team were considered medalists.

== Results ==
Place	Archer	Score
1st place, gold medalist(s)	Edmond van Moer (BEL)	11
2nd place, silver medalist(s)	Louis van de Perck (BEL)	8
3rd place, bronze medalist(s)	Joseph Hermans (BEL)	6
4	Firmin Flamand (BEL)	5
5	Edmond Cloetens (BEL)	4
6	Auguste van de Verre (BEL)	1

== Sources ==
- Belgium Olympic Committee (1957). Olympic Games Antwerp 1920: Official Report (in French).
- Wudarski, Pawel (1999). "Wyniki Igrzysk Olimpijskich" (in Polish).
