= Archery at the 1920 Summer Olympics – Team fixed small bird =

Archery at the Olympics

Men's team fixed small bird at the Games of the VII Olympiad
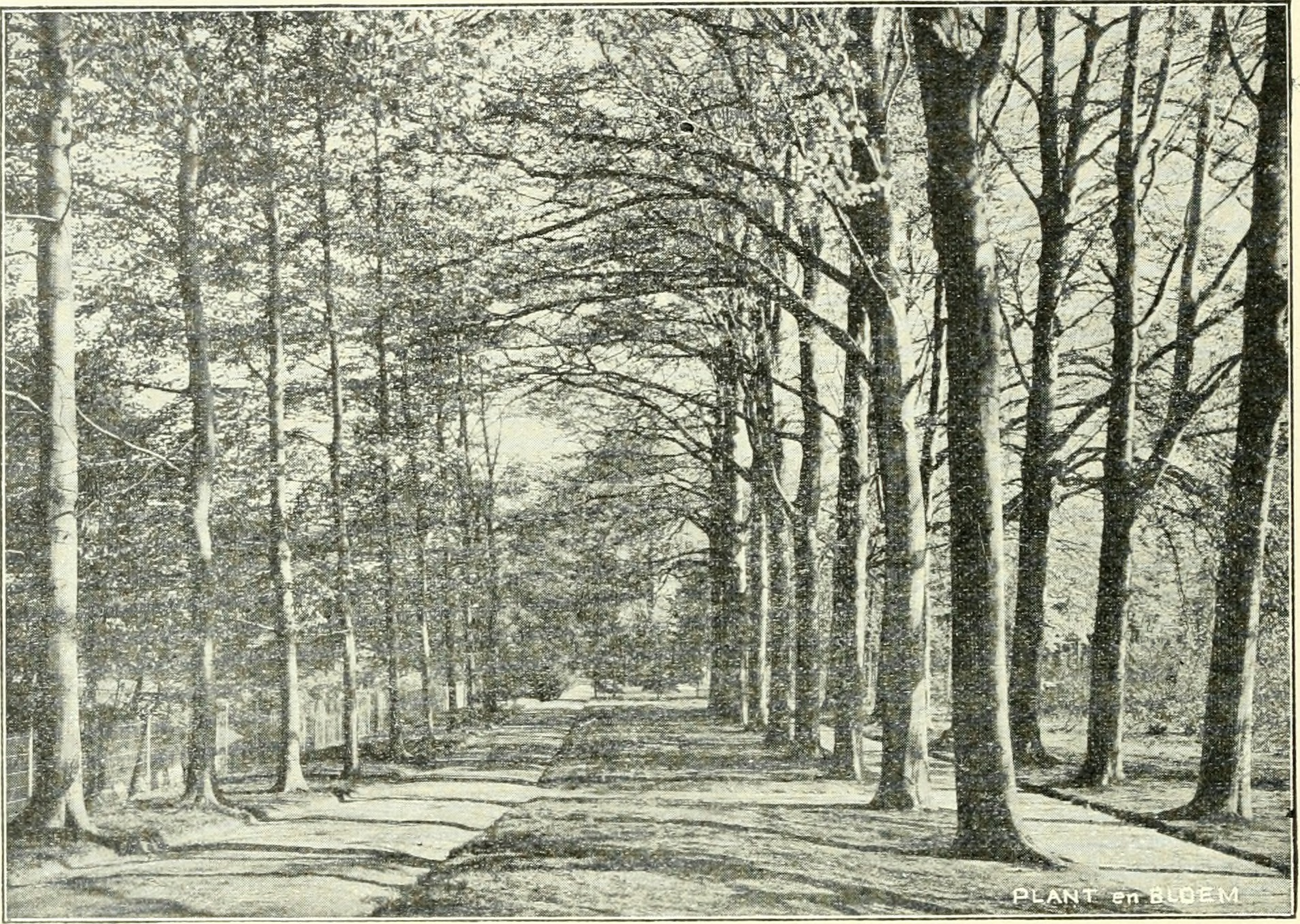
- Contemporary photograph of Nachtegalen Park, where the event took place
- Venue: Nachtegalen Park
- Date: 3 August
- Competitors: 6 from 1 nation

Medalists
1st place, gold medalist(s)		Edmond Cloetens, Louis Van de Perck, Firmin Flamand, Edmond Van Moer, Joseph Hermans, Auguste Van de Verre; Belgium

The team fixed small bird event was part of the archery programme at the 1920 Summer Olympics. The event, like all other archery events in 1920, was open only to men. One team of six archers from Belgium competed.

Two events, an individual and a team event, were contested. Each archer shot only once, with individual scores being summed to give a team score. The top three scores for each team were used to determine placings, though all six members of the team were considered medalists.

== Results ==
Place	Team	Scores			
Place	Team	1	2	3	Total
1st place, gold medalist(s)	Belgium	11	8	6	25

== Sources ==
- Belgium Olympic Committee (1957). Olympic Games Antwerp 1920: Official Report (in French).
- Wudarski, Pawel (1999). "Wyniki Igrzysk Olimpijskich" (in Polish).
