= Archery at the 1920 Summer Olympics – Team fixed large bird =

Archery at the Olympics

Men's team fixed large bird at the Games of the VII Olympiad
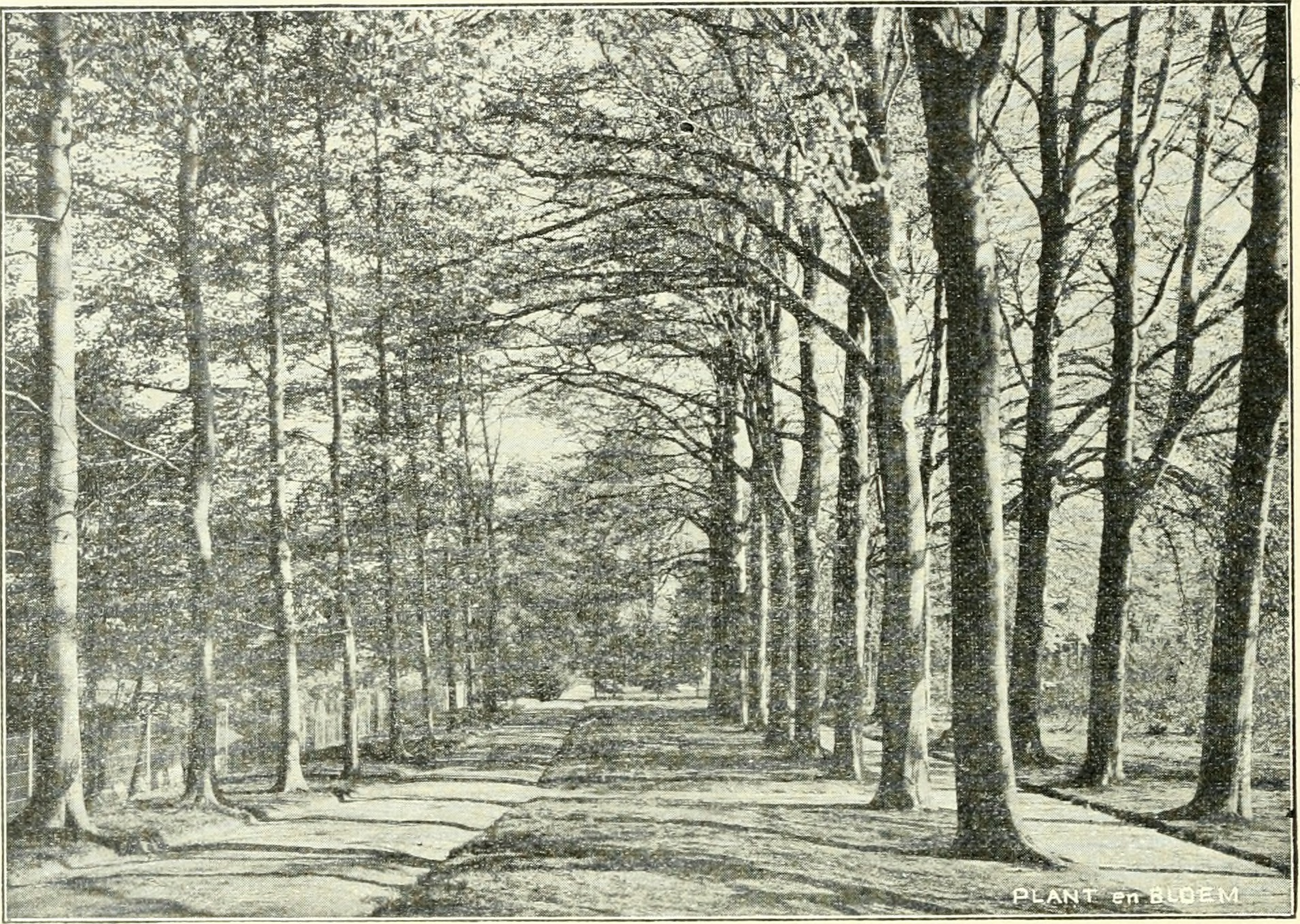
- Contemporary photograph of Nachtegalen Park, where the event took place
- Venue: Nachtegalen Park
- Date: 3 August
- Competitors: 6 from 1 nation

Medalists
1st place, gold medalist(s)		Edmond Cloetens, Louis Van de Perck, Firmin Flamand, Edmond Van Moer, Joseph Hermans, Auguste Van de Verre; Belgium

The Team fixed large bird event was part of the archery programme at the 1920 Summer Olympics. The event, like all other archery events in 1920, was open only to men. One team of six archers from Belgium competed.

There were two events in the fixed large bird category, though each archer shot only once. The individual scores were used to determine the individual medals and the top three scores for each six-man team were summed to determine team scores. All six members of each medalist team were considered to be medalists.

== Results ==
Place	Team	Scores			
Place	Team	1	2	3	Total
1st place, gold medalist(s)	Belgium	13	11	7	31

== Sources ==
- Belgium Olympic Committee (1957). Olympic Games Antwerp 1920: Official Report (in French).
- Wudarski, Pawel (1999). "Wyniki Igrzysk Olimpijskich" (in Polish).
