= Archery at the 1920 Summer Olympics – Individual fixed large bird =

Archery at the Olympics

Men's fixed large bird at the Games of the VII Olympiad
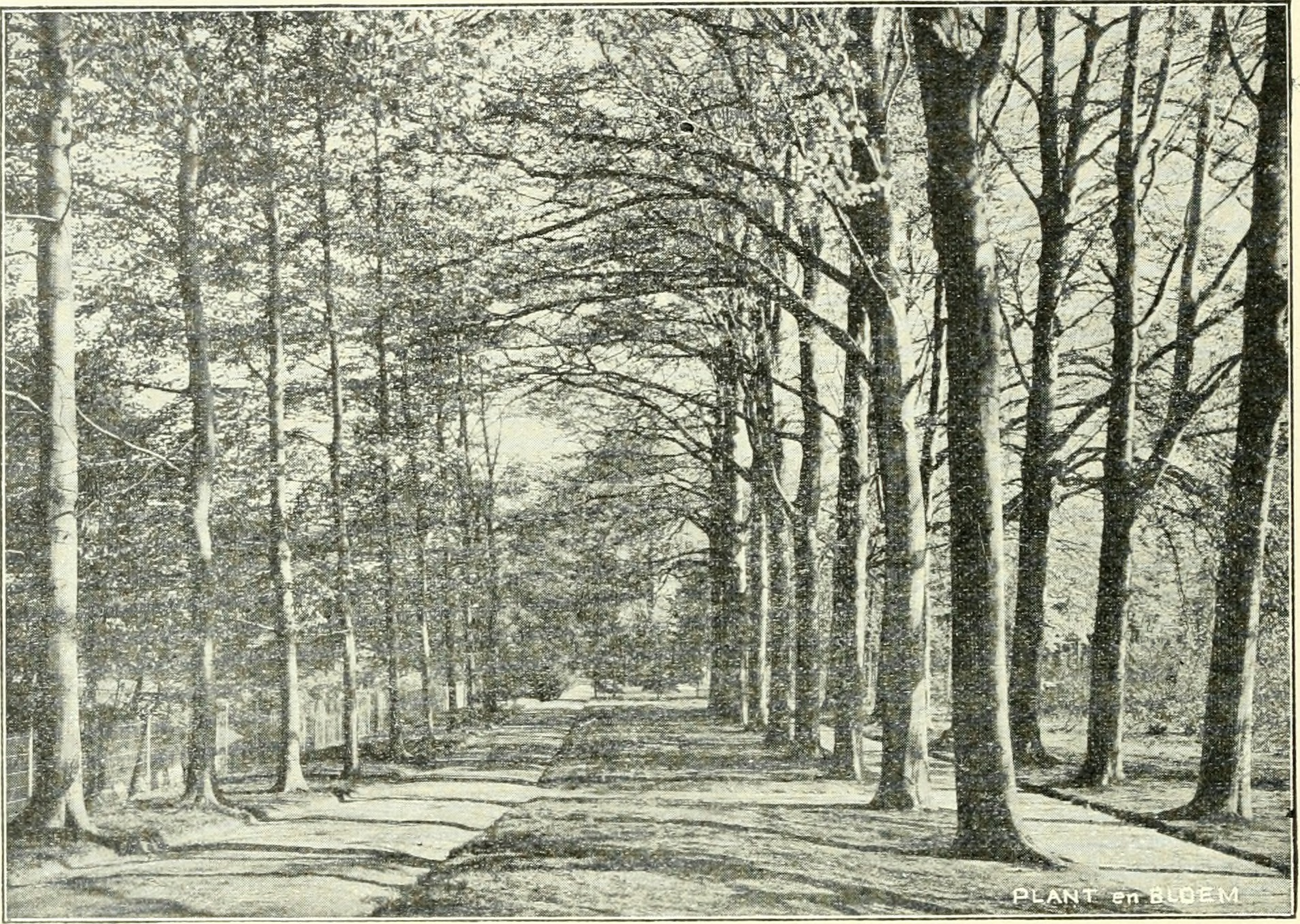
- Contemporary photograph of Nachtegalen Park, where the event took place
- Venue: Nachtegalen Park
- Date: 3 August
- Competitors: 6 from 1 nation

Medalists
| 1st place, gold medalist(s) | | Edmond Cloetens | Belgium |
| 2nd place, silver medalist(s) | | Louis van de Perck | Belgium |
| 3rd place, bronze medalist(s) | | Firmin Flamand | Belgium |

The individual fixed large bird event was part of the archery programme at the 1920 Summer Olympics. The event, like all other archery events in 1920, was open only to men. Six archers, all from Belgium, competed.

There were two events in the fixed large bird category, though each archer shot only once. The individual scores were used to determine the individual medals and the top three scores for each six-man team were summed to determine team scores. All six members of each medalist team were considered to be medalists.

== Results ==
| Place | Archer | Score |
|---|---|---|
| 1st place, gold medalist(s) | Edmond Cloetens (BEL) | 13 |
| 2nd place, silver medalist(s) | Louis van de Perck (BEL) | 11 |
| 3rd place, bronze medalist(s) | Firmin Flamand (BEL) | 7 |
| 4 | Edmond van Moer (BEL) | 6 |
| 5 | Joseph Hermans (BEL) | 5 |
| 6 | Auguste van de Verre (BEL) | 3 |

== Sources ==
- Belgium Olympic Committee (1957). Olympic Games Antwerp 1920: Official Report (in French).
- Wudarski, Pawel (1999). "Wyniki Igrzysk Olimpijskich" (in Polish).
