= Alfred Jørgensen =

Alfred Jørgensen may refer to:

- Alfred Frøkjær Jørgensen (1890–1973), Danish gymnast at the 1920 Summer Olympics
- Alfred Ollerup Jørgensen (1898–1988), Danish gymnast at the 1920 Summer Olympics
