= Frøkjær =

Frøkjær is a Danish surname. Notable people with the surname include:

- Alfred Frøkjær Jørgensen (1898–1988), Danish gymnast
- Cecilie Frøkjær (born 1968), Danish journalist and TV presenter
- Kristoffer Frøkjær-Jensen (born 1973), Danish science journalist and academic
- Mads Frøkjær-Jensen (born 1999), Danish footballer
- Naja Frøkjær-Jensen (born 2001), Danish handball player
