= Frederik Hansen =

Frederik Hansen may refer to:

- Frederik Hansen (gymnast) (1896–1962), Danish gymnast at the 1920 Summer Olympics
- Frederik Hansen (wrestler) (1885–1981), Danish wrestler; see Wrestling at the 1912 Summer Olympics – Men's Greco-Roman lightweight
- Frederik Hansen (bishop) (*1979), Norwegian Catholic prelate, coadjutor bishop of Roman Catholic Diocese of Oslo

== See also ==
- Frede Hansen (1897–1979), Danish gymnast at the 1920 Summer Olympics
