= Sarner =

Sarner or Särner may refer to

- Sarner Aa (river) in Switzerland
- Craig Sarner (born 1949), American ice hockey forward
- Klas Särner (1891–1980), Swedish gymnast
