= Vercruysse =

Vercruysse is a Flemish surname. Notable people with the surname include:

- André Vercruysse (1895–1968), Belgian cyclist
- Jan Vercruysse (1948–2018), Belgian artist, sculptor, and photographer
- Philippe Vercruysse (born 1962), French footballer
