= Granström =

Granström is a Swedish surname that translates to "fir tree (gran) by the stream (ström)." Notable people with the surname include:

- Brita Granström (born 1969) is, a Swedish artist and illustrator living and working in Great Britain
- Holger Granström (1917–1941) was, a professional ice hockey player who played in the SM-liiga
- Jonathan Granström (born 1986) is, a Swedish ice hockey player
- Konrad Granström (1900–1982) was, a Swedish gymnast who competed in the 1920 Summer Olympics
- Otto Granström (1887–1941) was, a Finnish gymnast who competed in the 1908 Summer Olympics
- Per Erik Granström (1942–2011), Swedish politician
