= Johannes Pedersen =

Johannes Pedersen may refer to:

- Johannes Pedersen (gymnast) (1892–1982), Danish gymnast
- Johannes Pedersen (theologian) (1883–1977), Danish theologian and linguist
