= Florimond =

- Gender: Masculine

Other names
- Related names: Florimund

Florimond is a given name. Notable people with the name include:

- Florimond Cornellie, Belgian sailor
- Florimond de Beaune, French jurist and mathematician
- Joseph Florimond Loubat, American philanthropist
- Count Claude Florimond de Mercy, Austrian Imperial field marshal
- Florimond Claude, Comte de Mercy-Argenteau, Austrian diplomat
- Florimond Ronger, French singer, composer, librettist, conductor and scene painter
- Prince Florimund, character in some versions of "Sleeping Beauty"
