= Gösta Törner =

Gösta Törner may refer to:

- Gösta Törner (gymnast)
- Gösta Törner (musician)
