= Verhavert =

Verhavert is a surname. Notable people with the surname include:

- Henri Verhavert (1874–1955), Belgian army officer and artistic gymnast
- Roland Verhavert (1927–2014), Belgian film director
