= Backhander =

Backhander or Backander may refer to:

- Helge Bäckander, a Swedish gymnast
- A backhand shot in several sports, or a person who makes such shots
  - See Backhand (disambiguation)
- Operation Backhander, US landings around Cape Gloucester, Pacific Campaign, World War 2
- Bribery
