= Backhand (disambiguation) =

Backhand is a stroke used in racquet sports and other sports, including:

- Tennis
- pickleball
- Ice Hockey

Backhand, Back hand, Back-hand or Backhanded may also refer to:

- Back Hand, a 1975 album by American jazz musician Keith Jarrett
- Backhand, a type of shot in ice hockey
- Backhand (character), a superhero in the Marvel universe
- Backhanded apology, a Non-apology apology
- Backhanded compliment, an insult disguised as a compliment
- Backhanded slap, a slap using the back of the hand as opposed to the palm

== See also ==
- Backhander (disambiguation)
