= Ture Hedman =

Swedish artistic gymnast

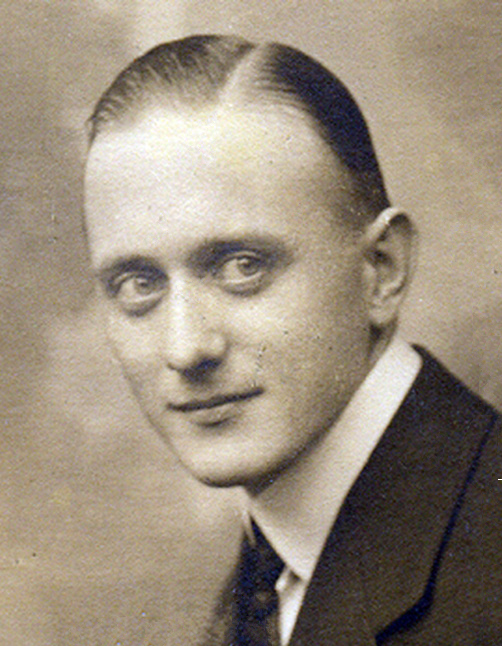
- Hedman c. 1920

Personal information
- Full name: Ture Eskil Hedman
- Born: 18 December 1895 Stockholm, United Kingdoms of Sweden and Norway
- Died: 3 August 1950 (aged 54) Stockholm, Sweden

Gymnastics career
- Discipline: Men's artistic gymnastics
- Country represented: Sweden
- Club: Stockholms Gymnastikförening
Medal record
Men's artistic gymnastics
Representing Sweden
Olympic Games
| Gold medal – first place | 1920 Antwerp | Team, Swedish system |

Ture Eskil Hedman (18 December 1895 – 3 August 1950) was a Swedish gymnast who competed in the 1920 Summer Olympics. He was part of the Swedish team that won the all-around Swedish system event.
