= Johannes Birk =

Danish gymnast (1893–1961)

- Born: 5 September 1893 Gjellerup, Denmark
- Died: 18 February 1961 (aged 67) Herning, Denmark

Gymnastics career
- Discipline: Men's artistic gymnastics
- Country represented: Denmark
Medal record
Men's artistic gymnastics
Representing Denmark
Olympic Games
Silver medal – second place	1920 Antwerp	Team, Swedish system

Johannes Birk (5 September 1893 in Gjellerup, Denmark – 18 February 1961 in Herning, Denmark) was a Danish gymnast who competed in the 1920 Summer Olympics. He was part of the Danish team, which was able to win the silver medal in the gymnastics men's team, Swedish system event in 1920.
