= Georg Vest =

Danish artistic gymnast

- Full name: Georg Erland Larsen Vest
- Born: 18 July 1896 Brarup, Denmark
- Died: 6 December 1977 (aged 81) Nykøbing Falster, Denmark

Gymnastics career
- Discipline: Men's artistic gymnastics
- Country represented: Denmark
Medal record
Men's artistic gymnastics
Representing Denmark
Olympic Games
Silver medal – second place	1920 Antwerp	Team, Swedish system

Georg Erland Larsen Vest (18 July 1896 in Brarup, Falster, Denmark – 6 December 1977 in Nykøbing Falster, Denmark) was a Danish gymnast who competed in the 1920 Summer Olympics. He was part of the Danish team, which won the silver medal in the gymnastics men's team, Swedish system event in 1920.
