= Jens Lambæk =

Danish gymnast (1899–1985)

- Full name: Jens Vedersø Stamp Lambæk
- Born: 16 October 1899 Gjellerup, Denmark
- Died: 21 October 1985 (aged 86) Herning, Denmark

Gymnastics career
- Country represented: Denmark
Medal record
Men's artistic gymnastics
Representing Denmark
Olympic Games
| Silver medal – second place | 1920 Antwerp | Team, Swedish system |

Jens Vedersø Stamp Lambæk (16 October 1899 in Gjellerup, Denmark – 21 October 1985 in Herning, Denmark) was a Danish gymnast who competed in the 1920 Summer Olympics. He was part of the Danish team, which was able to win the silver medal in the gymnastics men's team, Swedish system event in 1920.
