= Knud Kirkeløkke =

Danish artistic gymnast

- Full name: Knud Nielsen Kirkeløkke
- Born: 10 November 1892 Hellerup, Denmark
- Died: 7 February 1976 (aged 83)

Gymnastics career
- Discipline: Men's artistic gymnastics
- Country represented: Denmark
Medal record
Men's artistic gymnastics
Representing Denmark
Olympic Games
Silver medal – second place	1920 Antwerp	Team, Swedish system

Knud Nielsen Kirkeløkke (10 November 1892 in Hellerup, Denmark – 7 February 1976) was a Danish gymnast who competed in the 1920 Summer Olympics. He was part of the Danish team, which won the silver medal for the gymnastics men's team in the 1920 Swedish system event.
