= Kristian Madsen =

Danish artistic gymnast (1893–1988)

- Full name: Mads Kristian Madsen
- Born: 12 February 1893 Bøvling, Denmark
- Died: 10 March 1988 (aged 95) Holstebro, Denmark

Gymnastics career
- Discipline: Men's artistic gymnastics
- Country represented: Denmark
Medal record
Men's artistic gymnastics
Representing Denmark
Olympic Games
Silver medal – second place	1920 Antwerp	Team, Swedish system

Mads Kristian Madsen (12 February 1893 in Bøvling, Denmark – 10 March 1988 in Holstebro, Denmark) was a Danish gymnast who competed in the 1920 Summer Olympics. He was part of the Danish team, which was able to win the silver medal in the gymnastics men's team, Swedish system event in 1920.
