= Alf Aanning =

Norwegian gymnast (1896–1948)

- Full name: Alf Lied Aanning
- Born: 10 February 1896 Borgund, United Kingdoms of Sweden and Norway
- Died: 8 February 1948 (aged 51) Ålesund, Norway

Gymnastics career
- Discipline: Men's artistic gymnastics
- Country represented: Norway
- Gym: Aalesunds TF
Medal record
Men's artistic gymnastics
Representing Norway
Olympic Games
Silver medal – second place	1920 Antwerp	Team, free system

Alf Lied Aanning (10 February 1896 – 8 February 1948) was a Norwegian gymnast who competed in the 1920 Summer Olympics.

He was a member of the Norwegian team that won the silver medal in the men's gymnastics Free Systems and Apparatus event. He was born in Borgund Municipality, and represented the club Aalesunds TF.
