= Bengt Morberg =

Swedish gymnast

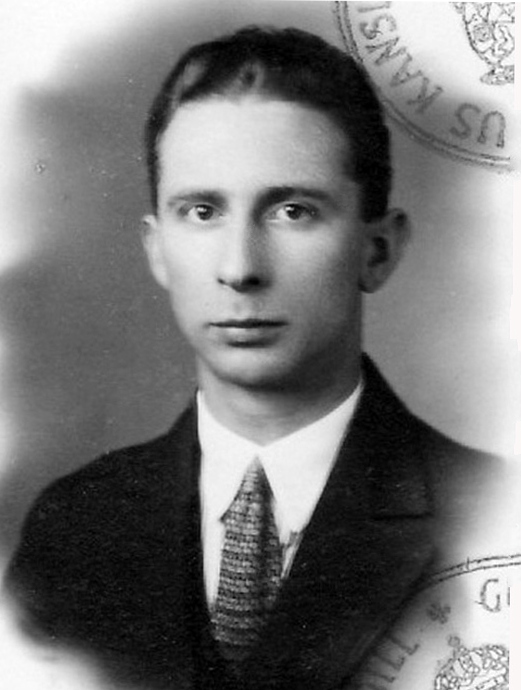
- Morberg c. 1920

Personal information
- Born: 1 June 1897 Västerås, United Kingdoms of Sweden and Norway
- Died: 26 September 1968 (aged 71) Västerås, Sweden

Gymnastics career
- Discipline: Men's artistic gymnastics
- Country represented: Sweden
- Club: Västerås Gymnastikförening
Medal record
Men's artistic gymnastics
Representing Sweden
Olympic Games
Gold medal – first place	1920 Antwerp	Team, Swedish system

Bengt Morberg (1 June 1897 – 26 September 1968) was a Swedish gymnast who competed at the 1920 Summer Olympics. He was part of the Swedish team that won the gold medal in the Swedish system event.
