= Hans Laurids Sørensen =

Danish artistic gymnast

- Born: 13 August 1901 Kirke Hvalsø, Denmark
- Died: 14 November 1974 (aged 73) Besser, Denmark

Gymnastics career
- Discipline: Men's artistic gymnastics
- Country represented: Denmark
Medal record
Men's artistic gymnastics
Representing Denmark
Olympic Games
Silver medal – second place	1920 Antwerp	Team, Swedish system

Hans Laurids Sørensen (13 August 1901 in Hvalsø, Denmark – 14 November 1974 in Besser, Samsø, Denmark) was a Danish gymnast who competed in the 1920 Summer Olympics. He was part of the Danish team, which won the silver medal in the gymnastics men's team, Swedish system event in 1920.
