= Hans Christian Sørensen =

Danish artistic gymnast

- Born: 11 October 1900 Drigstrup, Denmark
- Died: 23 January 1984 (aged 83) Drigstrup, Denmark

Gymnastics career
- Discipline: Men's artistic gymnastics
- Country represented: Denmark
Medal record
Men's artistic gymnastics
Representing Denmark
Olympic Games
Silver medal – second place	1920 Antwerp	Team, Swedish system

Hans Christian Sørensen (11 October 1900 in Drigstrup, Denmark – 23 January 1984 in Drigstrup, Denmark) was a Danish gymnast who competed in the 1920 Summer Olympics. He was part of the Danish team, which won the silver medal in the gymnastics men's Swedish system team event in 1920.
