= Aage Walther =

Danish artistic gymnast

- Born: 21 April 1897 Kølstrup, Denmark
- Died: 5 December 1961 (aged 64) Kølstrup, Denmark

Gymnastics career
- Discipline: Men's artistic gymnastics
- Country represented: Denmark
Medal record
Men's artistic gymnastics
Representing Denmark
Olympic Games
Silver medal – second place	1920 Antwerp	Team, Swedish system

Aage Walther (21 April 1897 in Kølstrup, Denmark – 5 December 1961 in Kølstrup, Denmark) was a Danish gymnast who competed in the 1920 Summer Olympics. He was part of the Danish team, which won the silver medal in the men's gymnastics team, Swedish system event in 1920.

Professionally, he worked as a farmer on the family farm.
