= Sven Johnson =

Swedish artistic gymnast

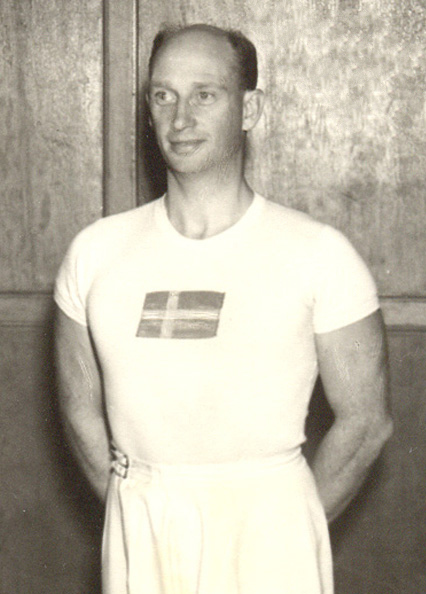
- Johnson c. 1920

Personal information
- Full name: Sven Olof Johnson
- Born: 12 September 1899 Norrköping, United Kingdoms of Sweden and Norway
- Died: 7 July 1986 (aged 86) Skärblacka, Sweden

Gymnastics career
- Discipline: Men's artistic gymnastics
- Country represented: Sweden
- Gym: Norrköpings Gymnastikförening
Medal record
Men's artistic gymnastics
Representing Sweden
Olympic Games
Gold medal – first place	1920 Antwerp	Team, Swedish system

Sven Olof Johnson (12 September 1899 – 7 July 1986) was a Swedish gymnast, who competed in the 1920 Summer Olympics. He was part of the Swedish team that won the all-around Swedish system event.
