= Arvid Andersson-Holtman =

Swedish gymnast

- Born: 20 December 1896 Ekerö, Uppland
- Died: 28 January 1992 (aged 95)

Gymnastics career
- Former countries represented: Sweden (1920)
Medal record
Men's gymnastics
Representing Sweden
Olympic Games
| Gold medal – first place | 1920 Antwerp | Team, Swedish system |

Arvid A. Andersson-Holtman (20 December 1896 – 28 January 1992) was a Swedish gymnast who competed in the 1920 Summer Olympics. He was born in Ekerö, Uppland. He was part of the Swedish team, which was able to win the gold medal in the gymnastics men's team, Swedish system event in 1920.
