= Niels Erik Nielsen =

Danish artistic gymnast

- Born: 1 May 1893 Ringe, Denmark
- Died: 4 March 1974 (aged 80) Ringe, Denmark

Gymnastics career
- Discipline: Men's artistic gymnastics
- Country represented: Denmark
Medal record
Men's artistic gymnastics
Representing Denmark
Olympic Games
Silver medal – second place	1920 Antwerp	Team, Swedish system

Niels Erik Nielsen (1 May 1893 in Ringe, Denmark – 4 March 1974 in Ringe, Denmark) was a Danish gymnast who competed in the 1920 Summer Olympics. He was part of the Danish team, which won the silver medal in the men's gymnastics, Swedish system event in 1920.
