= Erik Charpentier =

Swedish artistic gymnast

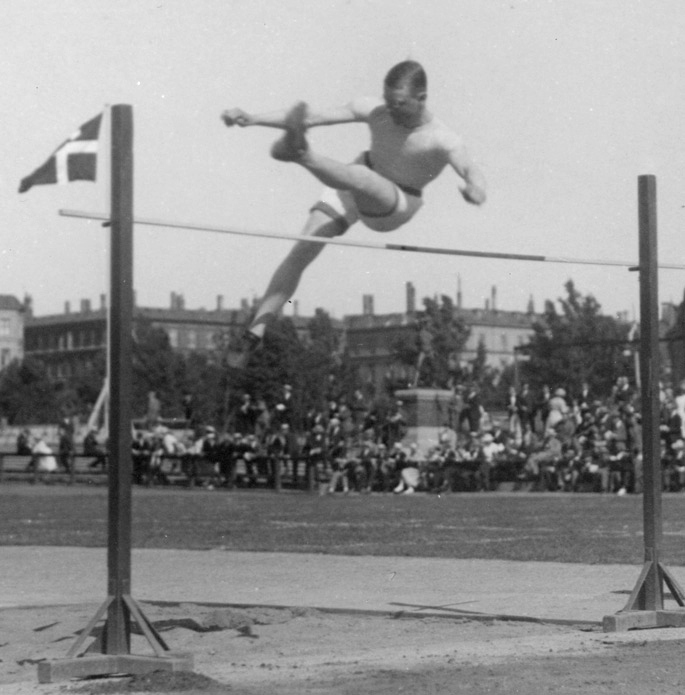
- Charpentier c. 1920

Personal information
- Full name: Carl Erik Charpentier
- Born: 17 August 1897 Sölvesborg, United Kingdoms of Sweden and Norway
- Died: 17 February 1978 (aged 80) Lund, Sweden

Gymnastics career
- Discipline: Men's artistic gymnastics
- Country represented: Sweden
- Club: Lunds Universitets Gymnastik och Idrottsförening
Medal record
Men's artistic gymnastics
Representing Sweden
Olympic Games
Gold medal – first place	1920 Antwerp	Team, Swedish system

Carl Erik Charpentier (17 August 1897 – 17 February 1978) was a Swedish gymnast and track and field athlete. He was part of the Swedish gymnastics team that won the gold medal in the Swedish system event at the 1920 Summer Olympics. Nationally, he also competed in the high jump and decathlon with his personal best in high jump as 1.85 m in 1921.
