= Aalesunds TF =

Norwegian gymnastics club

Aalesunds Turnforening is a Norwegian gymnastics club from Ålesund, founded on 27 November 1887.

Three Olympic gymnasts have represented the club: Wilhelm Steffensen, Herman Helgesen and Alf Aanning, who all became silver medalists in 1920.
