= Sture Ericsson =

Swedish gymnast

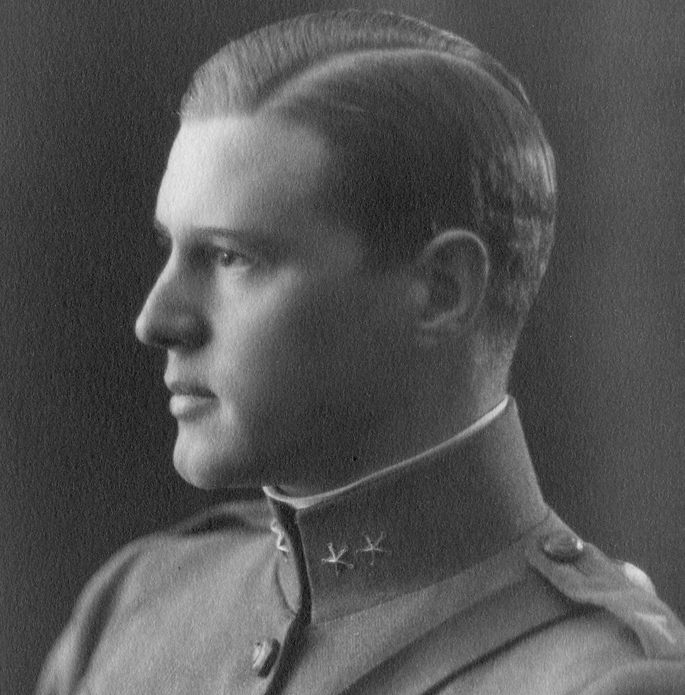
- Ericsson c. 1920

Personal information
- Full name: Sture Henrik Ericsson
- Born: 15 January 1898 Örebro, United Kingdoms of Sweden and Norway
- Died: 30 September 1945 (aged 47) Helsingborg, Sweden

Gymnastics career
- Discipline: Men's artistic gymnastics
- Country represented: Sweden
- Club: Stockholms Gymnastikförening
Medal record
Men's artistic gymnastics
Representing Sweden
Olympic Games
Gold medal – first place	1920 Antwerp	Team, Swedish system

Sture Henrik Ericsson (later Ewréus, 15 January 1898 – 30 September 1945) was a Swedish gymnast who competed in the 1920 Summer Olympics. He was part of the Swedish team that won the all-around Swedish system event.
