= Dynes Pedersen =

Danish artistic gymnast

- Full name: Dynes Sneptrup Pedersen
- Born: 26 May 1893 Sunds, Denmark
- Died: 28 December 1960 (aged 67) Copenhagen, Denmark

Gymnastics career
- Discipline: Men's artistic gymnastics
- Country represented: Denmark
Medal record
Men's artistic gymnastics
Representing Denmark
Olympic Games
Silver medal – second place	1920 Antwerp	Team, Swedish system

Dynes Sneptrup Pedersen (26 May 1893 – 28 December 1960) was a Danish gymnast who competed in the 1920 Summer Olympics. He was part of the Danish team, which won the silver medal in the gymnastics men's team, Swedish system event in 1920.
