= Åke Häger =

Swedish artistic gymnast

- Full name: Åke Simon Häger
- Born: 5 July 1897 Mårdaklev, United Kingdoms of Sweden and Norway
- Died: 9 March 1968 (aged 70) Lysekil, Sweden

Gymnastics career
- Discipline: Men's artistic gymnastics
- Country represented: Sweden
- Club: Stockholms Gymnastikförening
Medal record
Men's artistic gymnastics
Representing Sweden
Olympic Games
Gold medal – first place	1920 Antwerp	Team, Swedish system

Åke Simon Häger (5 July 1897 – 9 March 1968) was a Swedish gymnast who competed in the 1920 Summer Olympics. He was part of the Swedish team, which was able to win the gold medal in the gymnastics men's team, Swedish system event in 1920.
