= Fabian Biörck =

Swedish gymnast (1893–1977)

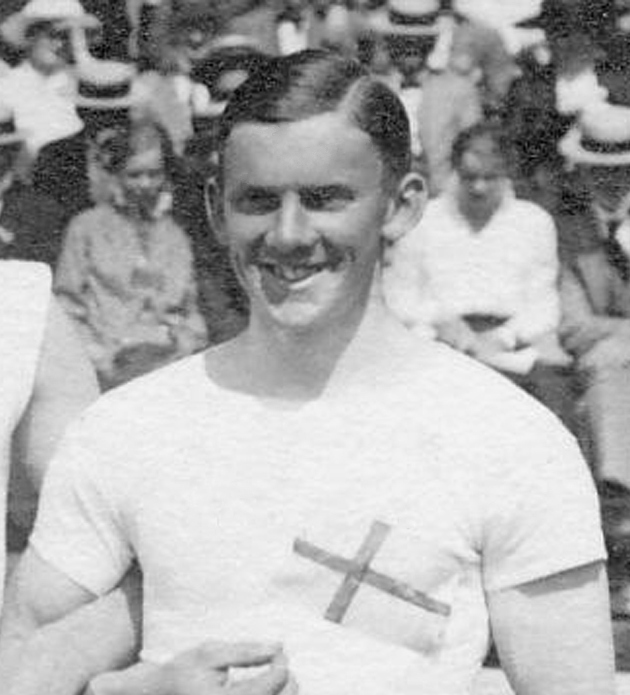

Personal information
- Full name: Carl Fabian Biörck
- Born: 21 October 1893 Jönköping, United Kingdoms of Sweden and Norway
- Died: 27 September 1977 (aged 83) Malmö, Sweden

Gymnastics career
- Discipline: Men's artistic gymnastics
- Country represented: Sweden
- Club: Jönköpings Gymnastikförening
Medal record
Men's artistic gymnastics
Representing Sweden
Olympic Games
Gold medal – first place	1920 Antwerp	Team, Swedish system

Carl Fabian Biörck (21 October 1893 – 27 September 1977) was a Swedish gymnast who won a team gold medal in the Swedish system event at the 1920 Summer Olympics. He was also the 1917 Swedish champion in the 400 m sprint.
