= Gunnar Söderlindh =

Swedish artistic gymnast

- Full name: Erik Gunnar Engelbrekt Söderlindh
- Born: 10 February 1896 Örebro, United Kingdoms of Sweden and Norway
- Died: 26 December 1969 (aged 73) Lundby, Västerås, Sweden

Gymnastics career
- Discipline: Men's artistic gymnastics
- Country represented: Sweden
- Club: Stockholms Gymnastikförening
Medal record
Men's artistic gymnastics
Representing Sweden
Olympic Games
Gold medal – first place	1920 Antwerp	Team, Swedish system

Erik Gunnar Engelbrekt Söderlindh (10 February 1896 – 26 December 1969) was a Swedish gymnast who competed in the 1920 Summer Olympics. He was part of the Swedish team, which won the gold medal in the gymnastics men's team, Swedish system event in 1920.
