= Søren Sørensen =

Danish artistic gymnast

- Full name: Søren Larsen Sørensen
- Born: 20 April 1897 Drigstrup, Denmark
- Died: 11 March 1965 (aged 67) Malling, Denmark

Gymnastics career
- Discipline: Men's artistic gymnastics
- Country represented: Denmark
Medal record
Men's artistic gymnastics
Representing Denmark
Olympic Games
Silver medal – second place	1920 Antwerp	Team, Swedish system

Søren Larsen Sørensen (20 April 1897 in Drigstrup, Denmark – 11 March 1965 in Malling, Denmark) was a Danish gymnast who competed in the 1920 Summer Olympics. He was part of the Danish team, which won the silver medal in the gymnastics men's team, Swedish system event in 1920.
