= Helge Gustafsson =

Swedish gymnast (1900–1981)

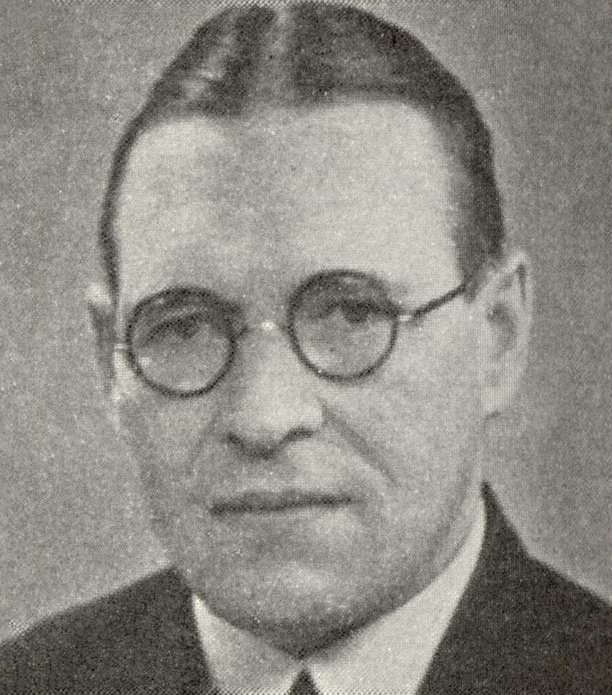
- Gustafsson, c. 1940s to 1950s

Personal information
- Full name: Bror Helge Gustafsson
- Born: 16 January 1900 Ervalla, Sweden–Norway
- Died: 5 October 1981 (aged 81) Örebro, Sweden

Gymnastics career
- Discipline: Men's artistic gymnastics
- Country represented: Sweden
- Gym: Karolinska Läroverkets Idrottsförening
Medal record
Men's artistic gymnastics
Representing Sweden
Olympic Games
Gold medal – first place	1920 Antwerp	Team, Swedish system

Bror Helge Gustafsson (Note: sometimes spelled Gustafson.) (16 January 1900 – 5 October 1981) was a Swedish gymnast who competed in the 1920 Summer Olympics. He was part of the Swedish team that won the gold medal in the Swedish system event.
