= Kristian Hansen (gymnast) =

Danish artistic gymnast (1895–1955)

- Full name: Kristian Aage Hansen
- Born: 28 January 1895 Everdrup, Denmark
- Died: 13 June 1955 (aged 60) Hammer, Næstved, Denmark

Gymnastics career
- Discipline: Men's artistic gymnastics
- Country represented: Denmark
Medal record
Men's artistic gymnastics
Representing Denmark
Olympic Games
Silver medal – second place	1920 Antwerp	Team, Swedish system

Kristian Aage Hansen (25 January 1895 in Everdrup, Næstved Denmark – 13 June 1955 in Hammer, Næstved, Denmark) was a Danish gymnast who competed in the 1920 Summer Olympics. He was part of the Danish team, which was able to win the silver medal in the gymnastics men's team, Swedish system event in 1920.
