= Alf Svensén =

Swedish artistic gymnast

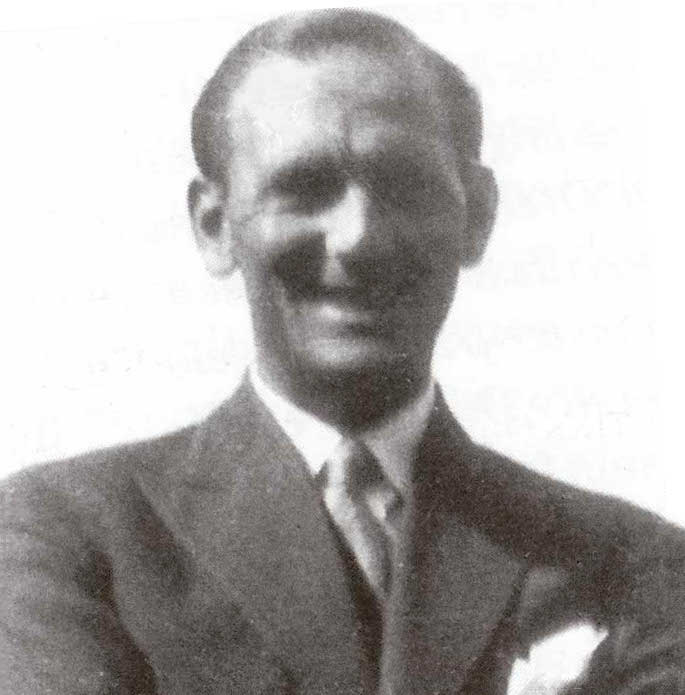
- Portrait of Svensén

Personal information
- Full name: Alf Erik Gillis Svensén
- Born: 28 July 1893 Tveta, United Kingdoms of Sweden and Norway
- Died: 17 December 1935 (aged 42) Stockholm, Sweden

Gymnastics career
- Discipline: Men's artistic gymnastics
- Country represented: Sweden
- Club: Kustartilleri 2 Idrottsförening
Medal record
Men's artistic gymnastics
Representing Sweden
Olympic Games
Gold medal – first place	1920 Antwerp	Team, Swedish system

Alf Erik Gillis Svensén (28 July 1893 – 17 December 1935) was a Swedish gymnast who competed at the 1920 Summer Olympics. He was part of the Swedish team that won the gold medal in the Swedish system event.

Svensén was a bomb expert at the Swedish Air Force and held the rank of captain.
