= Arne Jørgensen =

Danish artistic gymnast

- Born: 15 July 1897 Framlev, Denmark
- Died: 16 February 1989 (aged 91) Sønder Årslev, Denmark

Gymnastics career
- Discipline: Men's artistic gymnastics
- Country represented: Denmark
Medal record
Men's artistic gymnastics
Representing Denmark
Olympic Games
Silver medal – second place	1920 Antwerp	Team, Swedish system

Arne Jørgensen (15 July 1897 in Framlev, Denmark – 16 February 1989 in Sønder Årslev, Denmark) was a Danish gymnast who competed in the 1920 Summer Olympics. He was part of the Danish team, which was able to win the silver medal in the gymnastics men's team, Swedish system event in 1920.
