= Sven-Olof Jonsson =

Swedish artistic gymnast

- Born: 23 January 1893 Östersund, United Kingdoms of Sweden and Norway
- Died: 2 January 1945 (aged 51) Danderyd, Sweden

Gymnastics career
- Discipline: Men's artistic gymnastics
- Country represented: Sweden
- Club: Idrottsföreningen Kamraterna Stockholm
Medal record
Men's artistic gymnastics
Representing Sweden
Olympic Games
| Gold medal – first place | 1920 Antwerp | Team, Swedish system |

Sven-Olof Jonsson (23 January 1893 – 2 January 1945) was a Swedish gymnast who competed in the 1920 Summer Olympics. He was part of the Swedish team, which was able to win the gold medal in the gymnastics men's team, Swedish system event in 1920.
