= Frans Persson =

Swedish artistic gymnast

- Full name: Frans Holger Persson
- Born: 6 December 1891 Ystad, United Kingdoms of Sweden and Norway
- Died: 7 January 1976 (aged 84) Stockholm, Sweden

Gymnastics career
- Discipline: Men's artistic gymnastics
- Country represented: Sweden
- Club: Stockholms Gymnastikförening
Medal record
Men's artistic gymnastics
Representing Sweden
Olympic Games
Gold medal – first place	1920 Antwerp	Team, Swedish system

Frans Holger Persson (6 December 1891 – 13 January 1976) was a Swedish gymnast. He competed as part of the Swedish men's gymnastics team when they won a gold medal in the 1920 Summer Olympics.
