= Aage Jørgensen (gymnast) =

Danish gymnast

- Born: 22 January 1900 Framlev, Denmark
- Died: 4 September 1972 (aged 72) Skanderborg, Denmark

Gymnastics career
- Discipline: Men's artistic gymnastics
- Country represented: Denmark
Medal record
Men's artistic gymnastics
Representing Denmark
Olympic Games
Silver medal – second place	1920 Antwerp	Team, Swedish system

Aage Jørgensen (22 January 1900 – 4 September 1972) was a Danish gymnast who competed in the 1920 Summer Olympics. He was part of the Danish team, which was able to win the silver medal in the gymnastics men's team, Swedish system event in 1920.
