= Joseph Crickx =

Belgian coxswain

Personal information
- Born: 28 November 1888
- Died: unknown
- Relatives: Julien Crickx (brother)

Sport
- Sport: Rowing
- Club: CRB, Bruxelles

Joseph Crickx (born 28 November 1888, date of death unknown) was a Belgian rowing coxswain. He competed at the 1920 Summer Olympics in Antwerp with the men's eight where they were eliminated in round one. At times he competed alongside his brother Julien.
