= Charles Maerschalck =

Belgian gymnast (1887–1954)

- Born: 6 April 1885 Antwerp, Belgium
- Died: 6 March 1954 (aged 68) Cannes, France

Gymnastics career
- Discipline: Men's artistic gymnastics
- Country represented: Belgium

Charles Maerschalck (6 April 1885 – 6 March 1954) was a Belgian gymnast. He competed in the men's team, Swedish system event at the 1920 Summer Olympics, winning the bronze medal.
