= Lucien Dehoux =

Belgian gymnast (1890–1964)

- Born: 1890 Brussels, Belgium
- Died: 16 November 1964 (aged 73–74) Menton, France

Gymnastics career
- Discipline: Men's artistic gymnastics
- Country represented: Belgium

Lucien Dehoux (1890 – 16 November 1964) was a Belgian gymnast. He competed in the men's team, Swedish system event at the 1920 Summer Olympics, winning the bronze medal.
