= Albert Pape (fencer) =

Belgian fencer

Personal information
- Born: 1 May 1880
- Died: Unknown

Sport
- Sport: Fencing

Albert Pape (born 1 May 1880, date of death unknown) was a Belgian fencer. He competed in the individual and team foil events at the 1920 Summer Olympics.
