= Maurice Lysen =

Belgian polo player

Personal information
- Born: 17 August 1881; Berchem, Belgium
- Died: 2 December 1957 (aged 76); Antwerp, Belgium

Sport
- Sport: Polo

Maurice Lysen (17 August 1881 – 2 December 1957) was a Belgian polo player known for his participation in the 1920 Summer Olympics. Born in Berchem, Belgium, Lysen represented his country in the polo tournament held in Antwerp during the 1920 Games. Competing as either number two or as a back, he played in both of Belgium's matches, facing teams from Great Britain and the United States
