= Julianus Wagemans =

Belgian artistic gymnast (1890–1965)

- Born: 4 August 1890
- Died: 2 May 1965 (aged 74)

Gymnastics career
- Discipline: Men's artistic gymnastics
- Country represented: Belgium
Medal record
Men's artistic gymnastics
Representing Belgium
Olympic Games
Silver medal – second place	1920 Antwerp	Team, European system

Julianus Wagemans (4 August 1890 – 2 May 1965) was a Belgian gymnast who competed in the 1920 Summer Olympics. In 1920 he won the silver medal as member of the Belgian gymnastics team in the European system event. In the individual all-around competition he finished ninth.
