= Frans Gibens =

Belgian artistic gymnast (1896–1961)

- Full name: François Gibens
- Born: 1896
- Died: February 1961 (aged 64–65)

Gymnastics career
- Discipline: Men's artistic gymnastics
- Country represented: Belgium
Medal record
Men's artistic gymnastics
Representing Belgium
Olympic Games
Silver medal – second place	1920 Antwerp	Team, European system

François "Frans" Gibens (1896 – February 1961) was a Belgian gymnast who competed in the 1920 Summer Olympics. In 1920 he won the silver medal as member of the Belgian gymnastics team in the European system event. In the individual all-around competition, he finished eleventh.
