= Gösta Törner (gymnast) =

Swedish artistic gymnast

- Full name: Tor Gösta Alexander Törner
- Born: 10 July 1895 Stockholm, United Kingdoms of Sweden and Norway
- Died: 15 February 1971 (aged 75) Stockholm, Sweden

Gymnastics career
- Discipline: Men's artistic gymnastics
- Country represented: Sweden
- Club: Kristliga Förening av Unga Mäns Gymnastikavdelningar
Medal record
Men's artistic gymnastics
Representing Sweden
Olympic Games
Gold medal – first place	1920 Antwerp	Team, Swedish system

Tor Gösta Alexander Törner (19 July 1895 – 15 February 1971) was a Swedish gymnast who competed in the 1920 Summer Olympics. He was part of the Swedish team, which was able to win the gold medal in the gymnastics men's team, Swedish system event in 1920.
