= Helge Bäckander =

Swedish gymnast

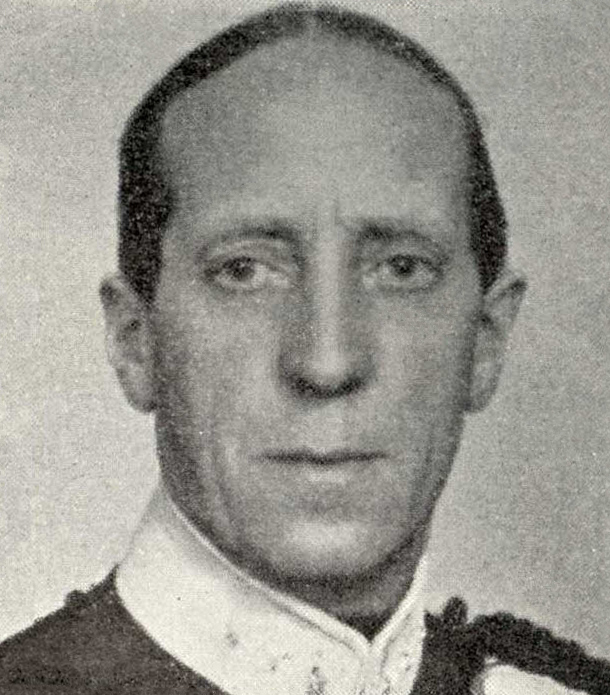

Personal information
- Full name: Helge Gustaf Samuel Bäckander
- Born: 13 October 1891 Jönköping, United Kingdoms of Sweden and Norway
- Died: 11 November 1958 (aged 67) Helsingborg, Sweden

Gymnastics career
- Discipline: Men's artistic gymnastics
- Country represented: Sweden
- Gym: Lidköpings Gymnastiksällskap
Medal record
Men's artistic gymnastics
Representing Sweden
Olympic Games
Gold medal – first place	1920 Antwerp	Team, Swedish system

Helge Gustaf Samuel Bäckander (13 October 1891 – 11 November 1958) was a Swedish gymnast who competed in the 1920 Summer Olympics. He was part of the Swedish team that won the gold medal in the Swedish system event. Bäckander was a military officer, and reached the rank of captain. He moved around Sweden as a gymnastics consultant, through Lidköping and Sundsvall, before settling in Helsingborg, where he died.
