= Frede Hansen =

Danish artistic gymnast

- Born: 5 April 1897 Borbjerg, Denmark
- Died: 31 July 1979 (aged 82) Tønder, Denmark

Gymnastics career
- Discipline: Men's artistic gymnastics
- Country represented: Denmark
Medal record
Men's artistic gymnastics
Representing Denmark
Olympic Games
Silver medal – second place	1920 Antwerp	Team, Swedish system

Frede Hansen (5 April 1897 – 31 July 1979) was a Danish gymnast who competed in the 1920 Summer Olympics. He was born in Borbjerg, and was part of the Danish team which won the silver medal in the gymnastics men's team, Swedish system event in 1920. He died in Tønder.
