= Émile Cornellie =

Belgian sailor

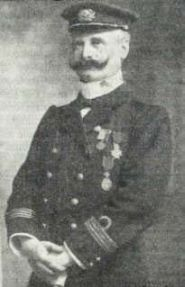

Medal record

Men's sailing

Representing Belgium

Olympic Games
Gold medal – first place	1920 Antwerp	6-metre class (1907 rating)

Émile François Cornellie (15 August 1869 – 27 December 1945) was a Belgian sailor who competed in the 1920 Summer Olympics. He was a crew member of the Belgian boat Edelweiß, which won the gold medal in the 6-metre class (1907 rating).
