= Alfred Ollerup Jørgensen =

Danish artistic gymnast

- Born: 30 August 1890 Tørring, Denmark
- Died: 26 November 1973 (aged 83) Svendborg, Denmark

Gymnastics career
- Discipline: Men's artistic gymnastics
- Country represented: Denmark
Medal record
Men's artistic gymnastics
Representing Denmark
Olympic Games
Silver medal – second place	1920 Antwerp	Team, Swedish system

Alfred Ollerup Jørgensen (30 August 1890 – 26 November 1973) was a Danish gymnast who competed in the 1920 Summer Olympics. He was part of the Danish team, which was able to win the silver medal in the gymnastics men's team, Swedish system event in 1920. He was born in Tørring, and died in Svendborg, Denmark.
