= Konrad Granström =

Swedish gymnast

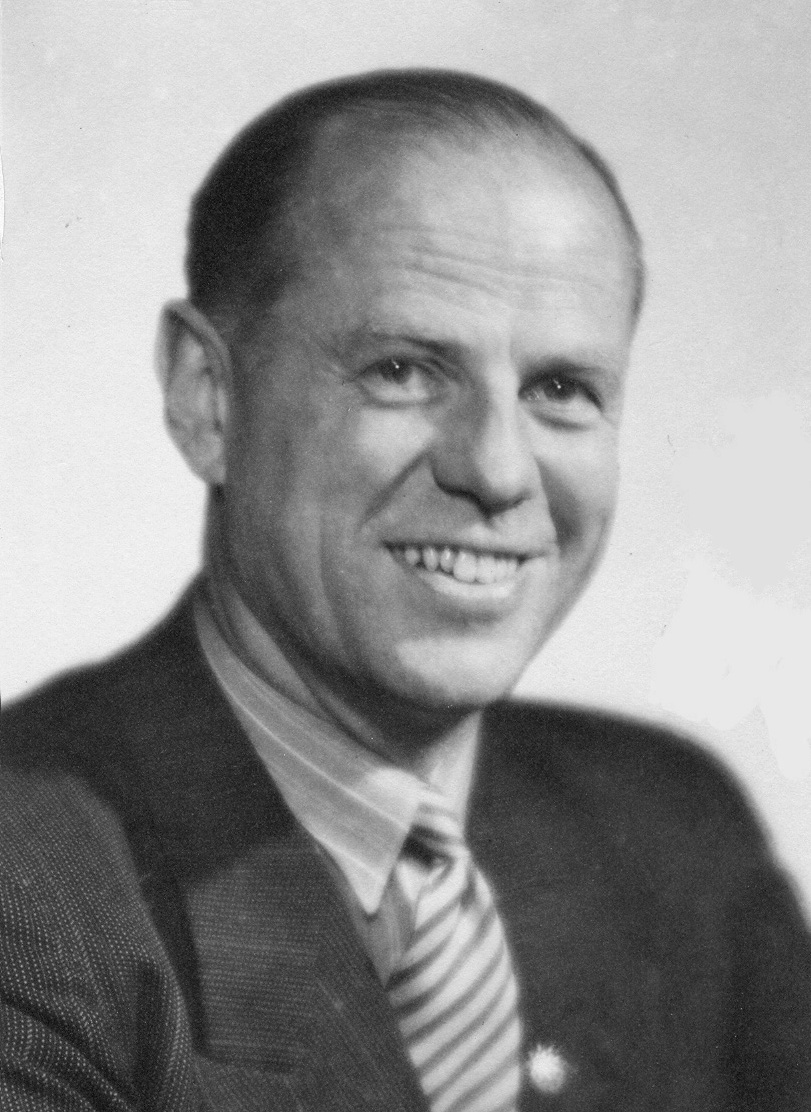
- Granström c. 1950s

Personal information
- Full name: Nils Konrad Granström
- Born: 21 October 1900 Luleå, United Kingdoms of Sweden and Norway
- Died: 4 January 1982 (aged 81) Stockholm, Sweden

Gymnastics career
- Discipline: Men's artistic gymnastics
- Country represented: Sweden
- Club: Kristliga Förening av Unga Mäns Gymnastikavdelningar
Medal record
Men's artistic gymnastics
Representing Sweden
Olympic Games
Gold medal – first place	1920 Antwerp	Team, Swedish system

Nils Konrad Granström (21 October 1900 – 4 January 1982) was a Swedish gymnast who competed at the 1920 Summer Olympics. He was part of the Swedish team that won the gold medal in the Swedish system event.
