= Eugène Auwerkeren =

Belgian gymnast (1885–1981)

- Full name: Eugenius Auwerkerken
- Born: 10 December 1885
- Died: 12 May 1981 (aged 95)

Gymnastics career
- Discipline: Men's artistic gymnastics
- Country represented: Belgium
Medal record
Men's artistic gymnastics
Representing Belgium
Olympic Games
Silver medal – second place	1920 Antwerp	Team, European system

Eugenius "Eugène" Auwerkerken (10 December 1885 – 1 May 1981) was a Belgian gymnast who competed in the 1920 Summer Olympics. In 1920, he won the silver medal as a member of the Belgian gymnastics team in the European system event.

Auwerkerken was born in Antwerp on 10 December 1885. He died there on 1 May 1981 at the age of 95.
