= Alphonse Van Mele =

Belgian artistic gymnast (1891–1972)

- Born: 29 December 1891
- Died: 11 January 1972 (aged 80)

Gymnastics career
- Discipline: Men's artistic gymnastics
- Country represented: Belgium
Medal record
Men's artistic gymnastics
Representing Belgium
Olympic Games
Silver medal – second place	1920 Antwerp	Team, European system

Alphonse Van Mele (29 December 1891 – 11 January 1972) was a Belgian gymnast who competed in the 1920 Summer Olympics. He was part of the Belgian team, which won the silver medal in the gymnastics men's team, European system event in 1920.
