= Julien Crickx =

Belgian rower

Personal information
- Born: 17 January 1891
- Died: unknown
- Relatives: Joseph Crickx (brother)

Sport
- Sport: Rowing
- Club: CRB, Bruxelles
Medal record
Men's rowing
Representing Belgium
European Rowing Championships
Silver medal – second place	1920 Mâcon	Eight

Julien Crickx (born 17 January 1891, date of death unknown) was a Belgian rower. He competed at the 1920 Summer Olympics in Antwerp with the men's eight where they were eliminated in round one. At times he competed alongside his brother Joseph.
