= Domien Jacob =

Belgian artistic gymnast (born 1897)

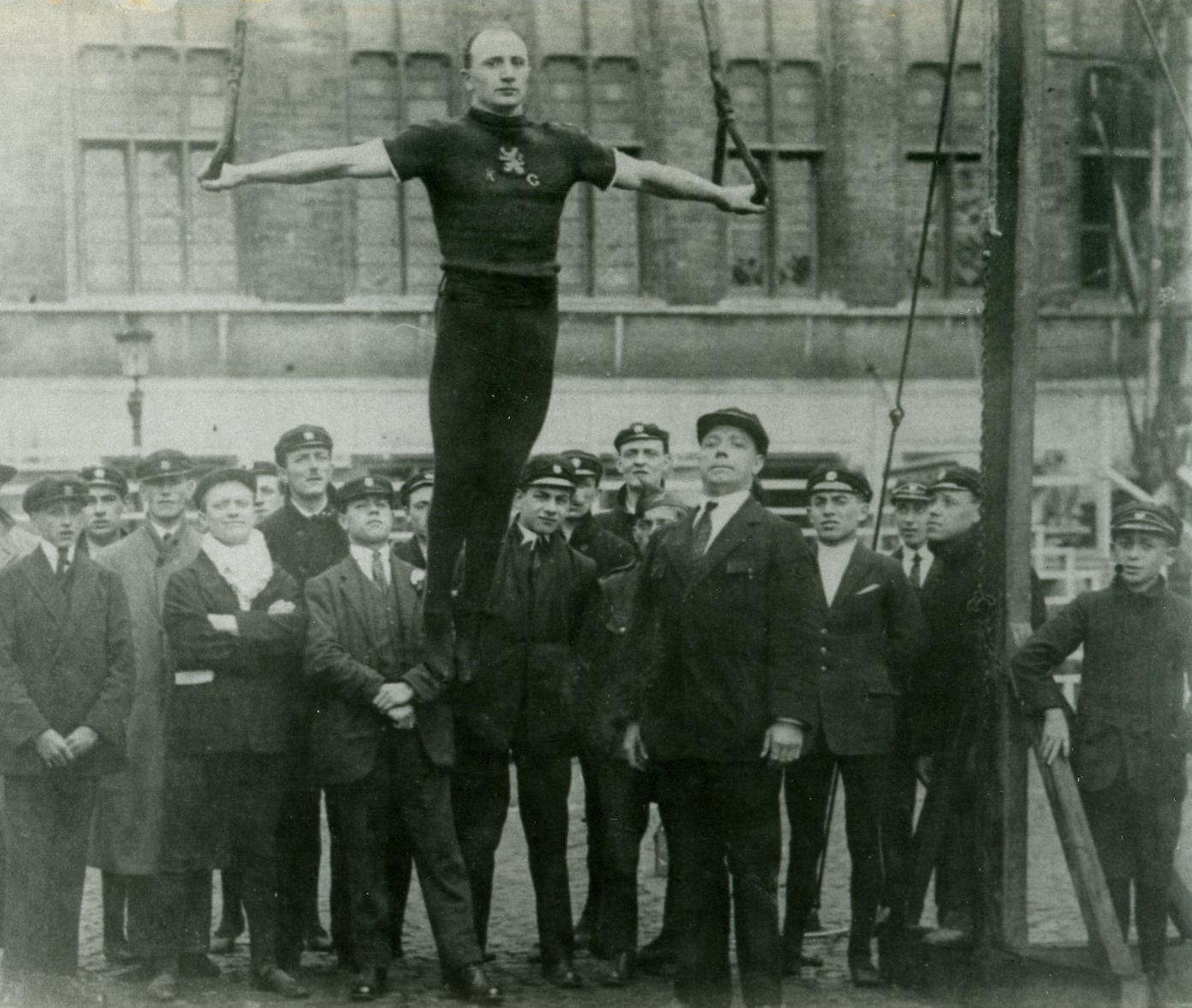
- Jacob in 1920

Personal information
- Born: 8 June 1897
- Died: 5 November 1984 (aged 87)

Gymnastics career
- Discipline: Men's artistic gymnastics
- Country represented: Belgium
Medal record
Men's artistic gymnastics
Representing Belgium
Olympic Games
Silver medal – second place	1920 Antwerp	Team, European system

Domien Jacob (8 June 1897 – 5 November 1984) was a Belgian gymnast who competed in the 1920 Summer Olympics. He was born and died in Sint-Niklaas. In 1920 he won the silver medal as member of the Belgian gymnastics team in the European system event.
