= Frederik Hansen (gymnast) =

Danish artistic gymnast

- Born: 2 July 1896 Malt, Denmark
- Died: 2 September 1962 (aged 66) Malt, Denmark

Gymnastics career
- Discipline: Men's artistic gymnastics
- Country represented: Denmark
Medal record
Men's artistic gymnastics
Representing Denmark
Olympic Games
Silver medal – second place	1920 Antwerp	Team, Swedish system

Frederik Hansen (2 July 1896 in Malt, Denmark – 2 September 1962 in Malt, Denmark) was a Danish gymnast who competed in the 1920 Summer Olympics. He was part of the Danish team, which won the silver medal in the gymnastics men's team, Swedish system event in 1920.
