= René Bauwens =

Belgian water polo player (1894–1959)

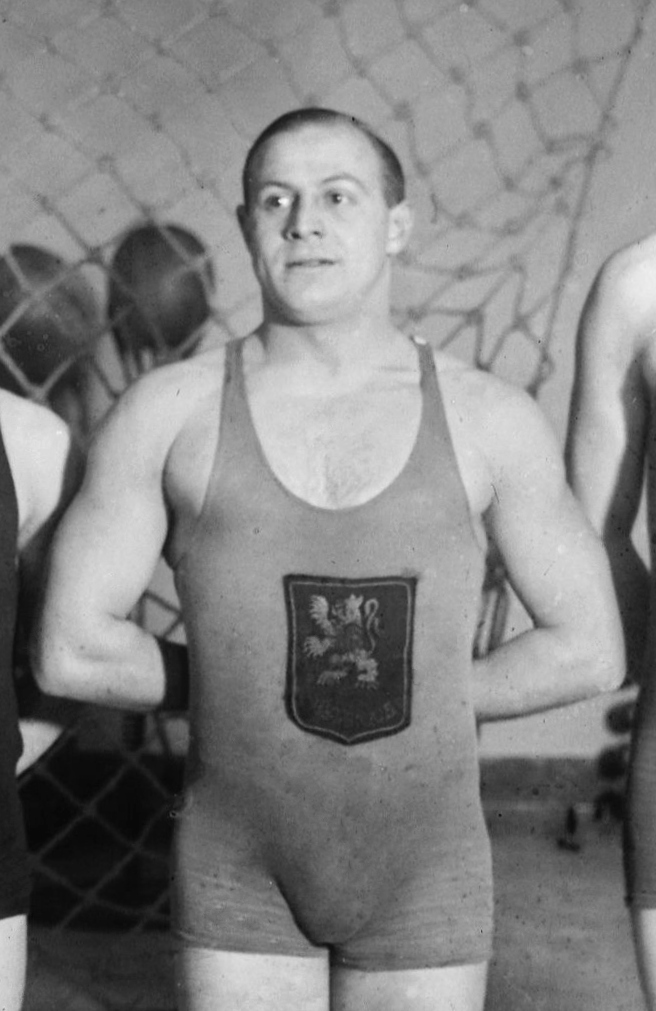
- René Bauwens in 1922

Personal information
- Born: 11 March 1894
- Died: 29 August 1959 (aged 65)

Sport
- Sport: Water polo, swimming
Medal record
Representing Belgium
Water polo
Olympic Games
Silver medal – second place	1920 Antwerp	Team competition

René Bauwens (11 March 1894 – 29 August 1959) was a Belgian freestyle swimmer and water polo player who competed in the 1920 and 1928 Summer Olympics.

In 1920, he won a silver medal with the Belgian water polo team. He was eliminated in the first round of the 4×200 metre freestyle relay event. Eight years later, his water polo team finished fifth. He played both matches and scored two goals.

== See also ==
- List of Olympic medalists in water polo (men)
