= Gustav Bayer =

Norwegian artistic gymnast

- Full name: Gustav Adolf Herman Bayer
- Born: 23 March 1895 Bærum, United Kingdoms of Sweden and Norway
- Died: 5 September 1977 (aged 82) Oslo, Norway

Gymnastics career
- Discipline: Men's artistic gymnastics
- Country represented: Norway
- Gym: Oslo Turnforening
Medal record
Men's artistic gymnastics
Representing Norway
Olympic Games
| Silver medal – second place | 1920 Antwerp | Team, free system |

Gustav Adolf Herman Bayer (23 March 1895 – 5 September 1977) was a Norwegian gymnast who competed in the 1920 Summer Olympics. He was part of the Norwegian team, which won the gold medal in the gymnastics men's team, free system event.
