= Charles Cadron =

Belgian cyclist (1889–1944)

Personal information
- Full name: Charles Alphonse Cadron
- Born: 12 September 1889 Damme, Belgium
- Died: 11 May 1944 (aged 54) Schaerbeek, German-occupied Belgium

Cycling career
- Sport: Cycling

Charles Cadron (12 September 1889 – 11 May 1944) was a Belgian cyclist. He competed at the 1920 and 1924 Summer Olympics.
