= François Claessens =

Belgian artistic gymnast (1897–1971)

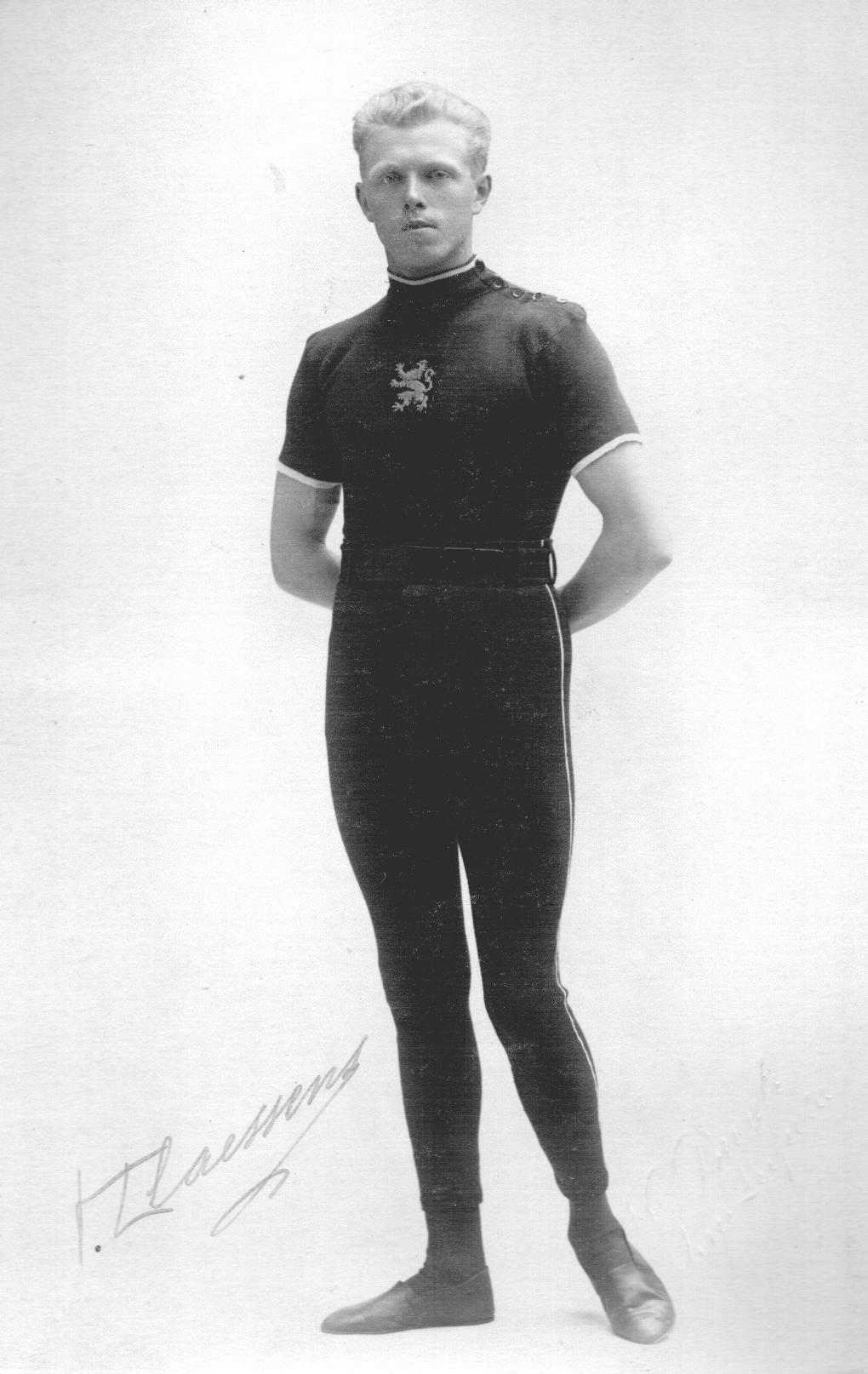
- Claessens in 1920

Personal information
- Born: 2 October 1897
- Died: 29 September 1971 (aged 73)

Gymnastics career
- Discipline: Men's artistic gymnastics
- Country represented: Belgium
Medal record
Men's artistic gymnastics
Representing Belgium
Olympic Games
Silver medal – second place	1920 Antwerp	Team, European system

François Claessens (2 October 1897 – 29 September 1971) was a Belgian gymnast who competed in the 1920 Summer Olympics. In 1920 he was a member of the Belgian gymnastic team which won the silver medal in the team, European system event.
