= Léopold Clabots =

Belgian artistic gymnast

- Born: 12 March 1893

Gymnastics career
- Discipline: Men's artistic gymnastics
- Country represented: Belgium
Medal record
Men's artistic gymnastics
Representing Belgium
Olympic Games
| Bronze medal – third place | 1920 Antwerp | Team, Swedish system |

Léopold Clabots (born 12 March 1893, date of death unknown) was a Belgian gymnast who competed in the 1920 Summer Olympics. In 1920, he won the bronze medal as member of the Belgian gymnastics team in the Swedish system event.
