= Frédéric Bruynseels =

Belgian sailor (1888–1959)

Olympic medal record

Men's Sailing
Gold medal – first place	1920 Antwerp	6-metre class (1907 rating)

Fréderic-Albert Gustave Bruynseels (13 July 1888 – 10 October 1959) was a Belgian sailor who competed in the 1920 Summer Olympics. He was a crew member of the Belgian boat Edelweiß, which won the gold medal in the 6-metre class (1907 rating).
