= Georges Vivex =

Belgian artistic gymnast (1890–1953)

- Born: 1 November 1890
- Died: 20 January 1953 (aged 62)

Gymnastics career
- Discipline: Men's artistic gymnastics
- Country represented: Belgium
Medal record
Men's artistic gymnastics
Representing Belgium
Olympic Games
Silver medal – second place	1920 Antwerp	Team, European system

Georges Vivex (1 November 1890 – 20 January 1953) was a Belgian gymnast who took part in the 1920 Olympic Games in Antwerp. Vivex was an Olympic silver medal at the 1920 Olympics in Antwerp. He was part of the Belgian team who came in second place in the team competition, behind Italy. Five teams took part, and the competition ran on 23 and 24 August 1920.
