= Klas Särner =

Swedish artistic gymnast

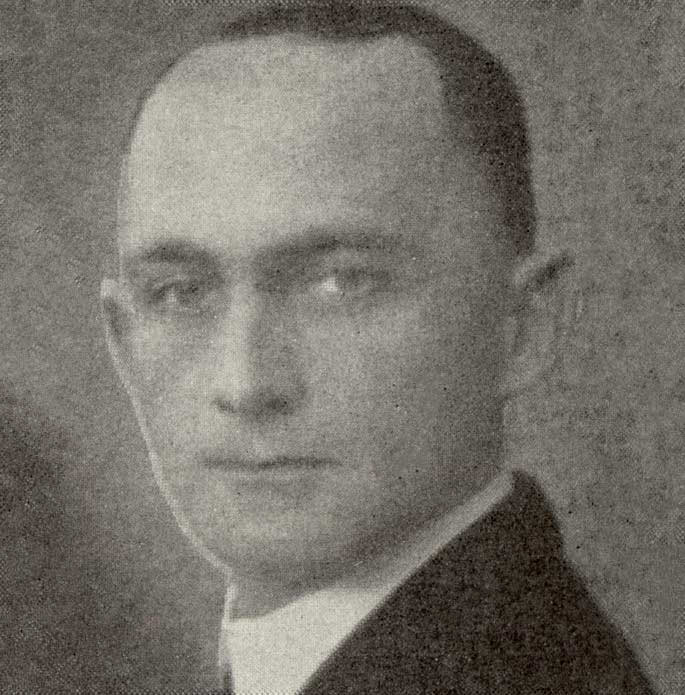
- Särner c. 1920s

Personal information
- Full name: Klas Johan Gustaf Särner
- Born: 25 December 1891 Habo, United Kingdoms of Sweden and Norway
- Died: 22 January 1980 (aged 88) Stockholm, Sweden

Gymnastics career
- Discipline: Men's artistic gymnastics
- Country represented: Sweden
- Club: Infanteri 6 Idrottsförening
Medal record
Men's artistic gymnastics
Representing Sweden
Olympic Games
Gold medal – first place	1920 Antwerp	Team, Swedish system

Klas Johan Gustaf Särner (25 December 1891 – 22 January 1980) was a Swedish gymnast who competed in the 1920 Summer Olympics. He was part of the team that won the Swedish system event.

Särner was a military officer and reached the rank of captain. Since 1935 he taught fencing at a dramatic theatre school, and in 1946 had an uncredited minor role in the film Iris och löjtnantshjärta.
