= Édouard Taeymans =

Belgian artistic gymnast

- Born: 20 April 1893

Gymnastics career
- Discipline: Men's artistic gymnastics
- Country represented: Belgium
Medal record
Men's artistic gymnastics
Representing Belgium
Olympic Games
Bronze medal – third place	1920 Antwerp	Team, Swedish system

Édouard Taeymans (born 20 April 1893, date of death unknown) was a Belgian gymnast who competed in the 1920 Summer Olympics. In 1920 he won the bronze medal as member of the Belgian gymnastics team in the Swedish system event.
