= Léon Darrien =

Belgian artistic gymnast (1887–1973)

- Born: 25 October 1887
- Died: 19 February 1973 (aged 85)

Gymnastics career
- Discipline: Men's artistic gymnastics
- Country represented: Belgium
Medal record
Men's artistic gymnastics
Representing Belgium
Olympic Games
Bronze medal – third place	1920 Antwerp	Team, Swedish system

Léon Darrien (25 October 1887 – 19 February 1973) was a Belgian gymnast who competed in the 1920 Summer Olympics. He was part of the Belgian team which won the bronze medal in the gymnastics men's team, Swedish system event in 1920.
