= Léon Bronckaert =

Belgian gymnast

- Born: 28 June 1893

Gymnastics career
- Discipline: Men's artistic gymnastics
- Country represented: Belgium
Medal record
Men's artistic gymnastics
Representing Belgium
Olympic Games
Bronze medal – third place	1920 Antwerp	Team, Swedish system

Léon Auguste Marie Bronckaert (born 28 June 1893, date of death unknown) was a Belgian gymnast who competed in the 1920 Summer Olympics. In 1920 he won the bronze medal as member of the Belgian gymnastics team in the Swedish system event.
