= Pierre Calle =

Belgian fencer

Personal information
- Born: 1 June 1889 Schelle, Belgium
- Died: Unknown

Sport
- Sport: Fencing

Pierre Calle (born 1 June 1889, date of death unknown) was a Belgian fencer. He competed in the team sabre event at the 1920 Summer Olympics.
