= Paul Arets =

Belgian gymnast (1890–1949)

- Full name: Paul Hubert Léon Arets
- Born: 16 May 1890 Liège, Belgium
- Died: 19 December 1949 (aged 59) Villers-l'Évêque, Belgium

Gymnastics career
- Discipline: Men's artistic gymnastics
- Country represented: Belgium

Paul Arets (16 May 1890 – 19 December 1949) was a Belgian gymnast. He competed in the men's team, Swedish system event at the 1920 Summer Olympics, winning the bronze medal.
