= René Pinchart =

Belgian gymnast (1891–1970)

- Born: 24 June 1891 Maldegem, Belgium
- Died: 2 November 1970 (aged 79) Middletown, Connecticut, US

Gymnastics career
- Discipline: Men's artistic gymnastics
- Country represented: Belgium

René Pinchart (24 June 1891 – 2 November 1970) was a Belgian gymnast. He competed in the men's team, Swedish system event at the 1920 Summer Olympics, winning the bronze medal.
