= René Smet =

Belgian rower

Personal information
- Born: René Victor Smet; 24 April 1898 Chätelet
- Died: 1980

Sport
- Sport: Rowing, Boxing
- Club: CRB, Bruxelles
Medal record
Men's rowing
Representing Belgium
European Rowing Championships
Silver medal – second place	1920 Mâcon	Eight

René Victor Smet (24 April 1898–1980) was a Belgian rower and boxer. In rowing, he competed at the 1920 Summer Olympics in Antwerp with the men's eight where they were eliminated in round one. At the same Olympic Games, he competed in the welterweight class in boxing where he was eliminated in round two.
