= Harry Bombeeck =

Belgian fencer

Personal information
- Born: 15 February 1876 Schaerbeek, Belgium
- Died: 15 August 1967 (aged 91) Brussels, Belgium

Sport
- Sport: Fencing

Harry Bombeeck (15 February 1876 – 15 August 1967) was a Belgian fencer. He competed in the team sabre event at the 1920 Summer Olympics.
