= Wilhelm Steffensen =

Norwegian artistic gymnast

- Full name: Wilhelm Marius Bakke Steffensen
- Born: 15 October 1889 Ålesund, United Kingdoms of Sweden and Norway
- Died: 26 July 1954 (aged 64) Ålesund, Norway

Gymnastics career
- Discipline: Men's artistic gymnastics
- Country represented: Norway
- Gym: Aalesunds TF
Medal record
Men's artistic gymnastics
Representing Norway
Olympic Games
Silver medal – second place	1920 Antwerp	Team, free system

Wilhelm Marius Bakke Steffensen (15 August 1889 – 26 July 1954) was a Norwegian gymnast who competed in the 1920 Summer Olympics. He was part of the Norwegian team, which won the gold medal in the gymnastics men's team, free system event. He was born in Aalesund, and represented the club Aalesunds TF.
