= Naja Frøkjær-Jensen =

Danish handball player (born 2001)

Personal information
- Full name: Naja Frøkjær-Jensen
- Nationality: Danish
- Born: 10 July 2001 (age 25) Støvring, Denmark
- Height: 1.80 m (5 ft 11 in)

Sport
- Sport: Handball
- Position: Line player
- Current club: Silkeborg-Voel KFUM
- Number: 20

Youth career
- Years: Team
- 2014-2015: Hjallerup IK
- 2016-2017: Viborg HK
- 2017-2018: EH Aalborg

Senior clubs
- Years: Team
- 2018-2021: Silkeborg-Voel KFUM

Naja Frøkjær-Jensen (born 10 July 2001) is a Danish former handball player. She retired from handball in 2021 at the age of 19 due to two back-to-back Cruciate ligament tear. while playing Silkeborg-Voel KFUM and the Danish national junior team.

She also represented Denmark in the 2017 European Women's U-17 Handball Championship, the 2018 Women's Youth World Handball Championship, and the 2019 Women's Junior European Handball Championship, placing 6th all three times.
