= Pierre Thiriar =

Belgian gymnast

Gymnastics career
- Discipline: Men's artistic gymnastics
- Country represented: Belgium

Pierre Thiriar was a Belgian gymnast. He competed in the men's team, Swedish system event at the 1920 Summer Olympics, winning the bronze medal.
