= Henri Verhavert =

Belgian artistic gymnast (1874–1955)

- Full name: Henri William Joseph Verhavert
- Born: 8 September 1874 Schaerbeek, Belgium
- Died: 9 August 1955 (aged 80) Woluwe-Saint-Lambert, Belgium

Gymnastics career
- Discipline: Men's artistic gymnastics
- Country represented: Belgium
Medal record
Men's artistic gymnastics
Representing Belgium
Olympic Games
Bronze medal – third place	1920 Antwerp	Team, Swedish system

Henri William Joseph Verhavert (8 September 1874 – 9 August 1955) was a Belgian army officer and gymnast who competed in the 1920 Summer Olympics. In 1920 he won the bronze medal as member of the Belgian gymnastics team in the Swedish system event.

He served in the Belgian Army from 1894 until 1936, he was a member of Fortiification Commission, retiring with the rank of lieutenant general, and was briefly recalled in 1940.
