= Alfred Frøkjær Jørgensen =

Danish artistic gymnast (1898–1988)

- Born: 21 December 1898 Framlev, Denmark
- Died: 28 February 1988 (aged 89) Aarhus, Denmark

Gymnastics career
- Discipline: Men's artistic gymnastics
- Country represented: Denmark
Medal record
Men's artistic gymnastics
Representing Denmark
Olympic Games
Silver medal – second place	1920 Antwerp	Team, Swedish system

Alfred Frøkjær Jørgensen (21 December 1898 in Framlev near Aarhus, Denmark – 28 February 1988 in Aarhus) was a Danish gymnast who competed in the 1920 Summer Olympics. He was part of the Danish team, which was able to win the silver medal in the gymnastics men's team, Swedish system event in 1920.
