= André Vercruysse =

Belgian cyclist (1895–1968)

André Jean Albert Vercruyssen
Personal information
- Born: 5 February 1895 Burcht, Belgium
- Died: 27 July 1968 (aged 73) Brussels, Belgium

Cycling career
- Sport: Cycling
Medal record
Men's road bicycle racing
Representing Belgium
Olympic Games
Bronze medal – third place	1920 Antwerp	Team road race

André Vercruyssen (5 February 1895 – 27 July 1968) was a Belgian cyclist. He won the bronze medal in the Team road race in the 1920 Summer Olympics.
