= Florimond Cornellie =

Belgian sailor

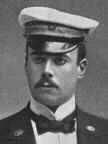

Medal record

Men's Sailing
| Gold medal – first place | 1920 Antwerp | 6-metre class (1907 rating) |

Florimond Cornellie (1 May 1894 – 1978) was a Belgian sailor who competed in the 1920 Summer Olympics. He was a crew member of the Belgian boat Edelweiß, which won the gold medal in the 6-metre class (1907 rating).
