= Auguste Van de Verre =

Belgian archer

Auguste Van de Verre was a Belgian archer. He won two gold medals at the 1920 Olympics.
