= Firmin Flamand =

Belgian archer

Medal record

Representing Belgium

Men's archery

Olympic Games
Gold medal – first place	1920 Antwerp	Fixed bird target (team)
Bronze medal – third place	1920 Antwerp	Fixed target (large birds)

Firmin Flamand was a Belgian archer and Olympic champion. He competed at the 1920 Summer Olympics in Antwerp, where he won a gold medal with the Belgian team, and also an individual bronze medal.
