= Gymnastics at the 1920 Summer Olympics – Men's team, Swedish system =

Gymnastics at the Olympics

Men's Swedish system team gymnastics at the Games of the VII Olympiad
- Venue: Olympisch Stadion
- Date: August 26, 1920
- Competitors: 73 from 3 nations

Medalists
1st place, gold medalist(s)		Sweden
2nd place, silver medalist(s)		Denmark
3rd place, bronze medalist(s)		Belgium

The men's Swedish system team was an artistic gymnastics event held as part of the Gymnastics at the 1920 Summer Olympics programme. It was the second and final appearance of the event, which was one of three team gymnastics events held in 1920 (along with the free system team event and the all-around team event. Three teams competed, for a total of 73 gymnasts.

== Results ==
Final
Place	Team	Score
Gold	Sweden	1363.833
Silver	Denmark	1324.833
Bronze	Belgium	1094.000

== Sources ==
- Belgium Olympic Committee (1957). Olympic Games Antwerp 1920: Official Report (in French).
- Wudarski, Pawel (1999). "Wyniki Igrzysk Olimpijskich" (in Polish).
