= Belgium at the 1900 Summer Olympics =

- IOC code: BEL

in Paris, France 14 May, 1900 – 28 October, 1900
- Competitors: 78 in 11 sports and 31 events
- Medals Ranked 4th: Gold 6 Silver 7 Bronze 5 Total 18

Summer Olympics appearances (overview)
- 1900; 1904; 1908; 1912; 1920; 1924; 1928; 1932; 1936; 1948; 1952; 1956; 1960; 1964; 1968; 1972; 1976; 1980; 1984; 1988; 1992; 1996; 2000; 2004; 2008; 2012; 2016; 2020; 2024; 2028

Other related appearances
- 1906 Intercalated Games

Belgium competed at the 1900 Summer Olympics in Paris, France. It was the first appearance of the European nation. Belgium was represented in France by 78 athletes, all of them male, who competed in 11 disciplines. They comprised 95 entries in 28 events.

== Medalists ==
In the discipline sections below, the medalists' names are bolded.

Medal	Name	Sport	Event	Date
Gold	Emmanuel Foulon	Archery	Sur la Perche à la Herse	July 16
Gold	Hubert Van Innis	Archery	Au Cordon Doré 33 metres	August 14
Gold	Hubert Van Innis	Archery	Au Chapelet 33 metres	August 14
Gold	Aimé Haegeman	Equestrian	Individual jumping	May 29
Gold	Constant van Langhendonck	Equestrian	Long jump	May 31
Gold	Georges Nagelmackers	Equestrian	Mail coach	June 2
Silver	Émile Druart	Archery	Sur la Perche à la Herse	July 16
Silver	Hubert Van Innis	Archery	Au Cordon Doré 50 metres	August 14
Silver	Hubert Van Innis	Archery	Championnat du Monde	August 1
Silver	Georges Van Der Poele	Equestrian	Individual jumping	May 29
Silver	Jules De Bisschop; Prosper Bruggeman; Oscar Dessomville; Oscar De Cock; Maurice Hemelsoet; Marcel Van Crombrugge; Frank Odberg; Maurice Verdonck; Alfred Van Landeghem	Rowing	Men's eight	August 26
Silver	René Guyot	Shooting	Men's trap	July 17
Silver	Brussels Swimming and Water Polo Club: Jean De Backer; Victor De Behr; Henri Cohen; Fernand Feyaerts; Oscar Grégoire; Albert Michant; Georges Romer; Guillaume Séron; Victor Sonnemans; Arthur Upton	Water polo	Men's tournament	August 12
Bronze	Louis Glineur	Archery	Sur la Perche à la Pyramide	July 16
Bronze	Georges Van Der Poele	Equestrian	High jump	June 2
Bronze	Paul Van Asbroeck	Shooting	Men's 300 metre free rifle, three positions	August 5
Bronze	Charles Paumier	Shooting	Men's 300 metre free rifle, standing	August 5
Bronze	Université de Bruxelles: Marius Delbecque; Hendrik van Heuckelum (NED); Raul Kelecom; Marcel Leboutte; Lucien Londot; Ernest Moreau de Melen; Eugène Neefs; Gustave Pelgrims; Alphonse Renier; Hilaire Spanoghe; Eric Thornton (GBR)	Football	Men's tournament	September 23

Medals by sport
Sport	1st place, gold medalist(s)	2nd place, silver medalist(s)	3rd place, bronze medalist(s)	Total
Archery	3	3	1	**7**
Equestrian	3	1	1	**5**
Rowing	0	1	0	**1**
Shooting	0	1	2	**3**
Water polo	0	1	0	**1**
Total	6	7	4	17

=== Multiple medalists ===
The following competitors won multiple medals at the 1900 Olympic Games.

Name	Medal	Sport	Event
Hubert Van Innis	Gold; Gold; Silver; Silver	Archery	Au Cordon Doré 33 metres Au Chapelet 33 metres Au Cordon Doré 50 metres Championnat du Monde
Georges Van Der Poele	Silver; Bronze	Equestrian	Individual jumping High jump

== Competitors ==
The following is the list of number of competitors in the Games.

Sport	Men	Women	Total
Archery	4	0	18
Cycling	1	0	1
Equestrian	13	0	13
Fencing	5	0	5
Football	9	0	9
Gymnastics	2	0	2
Rowing	9	0	9
Shooting	11	0	11
Swimming	1	0	1
Water polo	10	0	10
Total	64	0	78

== Archery ==
Belgium took three of seven gold medals, three of eight silver medals, and one of five bronze medals in the seven archery events that were Olympic. France and the Netherlands were the only other nations that competed, with France taking the remaining thirteen medals. Many of the French, Dutch, and Belgian competitors are unknown as their names were not recorded. 4 of the 18 Belgian archers are known by name, 14 are not. The 18 archers had 36 entries over all 7 events.

Athlete	Event	Final	
Athlete	Event	Score	Rank
Hubert Van Innis	Au Cordon Doré 33 metres	Unknown	1st place, gold medalist(s)
Hubert Van Innis	Au Cordon Doré 50 metres	29	2nd place, silver medalist(s)
Hubert Van Innis	Au Chapelet 33 metres	Unknown	2nd place, silver medalist(s)
Hubert Van Innis	Au Chapelet 50 metres	Unknown	4
Hubert Van Innis	Championnat du Monde	16	2nd place, silver medalist(s)
Emmanuel Foulon	Sur la Perche à la Herse	Unknown	1st place, gold medalist(s)
Émile Druart	Sur la Perche à la Herse	Unknown	2nd place, silver medalist(s)
Louis Glineur	Sur la Perche à la Pyramide	Unknown	3rd place, bronze medalist(s)

== Cycling ==
Belgium's first cycling appearance was at the second Olympic cycling competition, 1900. One cyclist from Belgium competed in one event, winning no medals. Only his surname is known.

=== Sprint ===
Athlete	Event	Qualification		Quarterfinals	Semifinals	Final	
Athlete	Event	Time	Rank	Opposition Time	Opposition Time	Opposition Time	Rank
Vincent	Men's sprint	Unknown	2 Q	Taillandier (FRA); Thomann (FRA); L	Did not advance		

== Equestrian ==
Belgium competed in the inaugural Olympic equestrian events, taking gold medals in 3 of 5 events. The names of 11 Belgian equestrians are unknown.

=== Jumping ===
Athlete	Horse	Event	Time	Rank
Aimé Haegeman	Benton II	Individual	2:16.0	1st place, gold medalist(s)
Constant van Langhendonck	Unknown	Individual	Unknown	4-37
Constant van Langhendonck	Unknown	Individual	Unknown	DNF
Georges Kryn	Unknown	Individual	Unknown	4-37
Georges Van Der Poele	Windsor Squire	Individual	2:17.6	2nd place, silver medalist(s)
Between 3 and 6 other riders	Unknown	Individual	Unknown	4-37

=== High jump ===
Athlete	Horse	Event	Height	Rank
Charles van Langhendonck	Roxanne	High jump	Unknown	9-19
Constant van Langhendonck	Black Fly	High jump	Unknown	9-19
Georges Van Der Poele	Ludlow	High jump	1.70	3rd place, bronze medalist(s)
Up to 2 other riders	Unknown	High jump	Unknown	9-19

=== Long jump ===
Athlete	Horse	Event	Distance	Rank
Constant van Langhendonck	Extra-Dry	Long jump	6.10	1st place, gold medalist(s)
van der Meulen	The Wett	Long jump	Unknown	6
1 other rider	Unknown	Long jump	Unknown	7-19

=== Hacks and hunter combined ===
Athlete	Horse	Event	Place
Georges Van Der Poele	Unknown	Hacks and hunter combined	5–51

=== Four-in-hand (mail coach) ===
Athlete	Event	Place
Georges Chaudoir	Mail coach	5–31
Paul Lambert	Mail coach	5–31
Georges Nagelmackers	Mail coach	1st place, gold medalist(s)
Georges Nagelmackers	Mail coach	5–31
Orban	Mail coach	5–31
Georges Pauwels	Mail coach	5–31
Gaston Saint-Paul de Sinçay	Mail coach	5–31
Étienne van Zuylen van Nyevelt	Mail coach	5–31
Étienne van Zuylen van Nyevelt	Mail coach	5–31

== Fencing ==
Belgium competed in fencing at the nation's debut. The nation sent five fencers.

Athlete	Event	Round 1			Quarterfinal			Repechage			Semifinal			Final		
Athlete	Event	MW	ML	Rank	MW	ML	Rank	MW	ML	Rank	MW	ML	Rank	MW	ML	Rank
Tony Smet	Men's épée			Q			4-6	—N/a			Did not advance					
Tony Smet	Men's foil			Q			Q	Bye			1	6	8C			14
Fernand Desmedt	Men's masters foil				Did not advance											
Pierre Selderslagh	Men's masters foil			Q			Q	Bye			3	4	5C			10
Cyrille Verbrugge	Men's masters foil			Q			Q	Bye			1	6	=7C			15
Hébrant	Masters sabre			Q	—N/a						5	2	2Q	1	6	8

== Football ==
Université de Bruxelles represented Belgium in the football competition. The club squad lost its only match, to Club Française, to take third in the three-team competition.

Summary

Key:

- A.E.T – After extra time.
- P – Match decided by penalty-shootout.

Team	Event	Group Stage	
Team	Event	Opposition Score	Rank
Université de Bruxelles	Men's tournament	Upton Park F.C. L 6–2	3rd place, bronze medalist(s)

Team roster

No.	Pos.	Player	Date of birth (age)	Caps	Goals	1900 club
	FW	(Belgium) Marius Delbecque				(Royal Belgian Football Association) Skill F.C. de Bruxelles
	FW	(Netherlands) (Belgium) Hendrik van Heuckelum				(Royal Belgian Football Association) Léopold Club de Bruxelles
	DF	(Belgium) Raul Kelecom				(Royal Belgian Football Association) RFC Liégeois
	GK	(Belgium) Marcel Leboutte				(Royal Belgian Football Association) Spa FC
	FW	(Belgium) Lucien Londot				(Royal Belgian Football Association) RFC Liégeois
	DF	(Belgium) Ernest Moreau de Melen				(Royal Belgian Football Association) RFC Liégeois
	MF	(Belgium) Eugène Neefs				(Royal Belgian Football Association) Sporting Club de Louvain
	MF	(Belgium) Gustave Pelgrims (c)				(Royal Belgian Football Association) Léopold Club de Bruxelles
	MF	(Belgium) Alphonse Renier				(Royal Belgian Football Association) Racing Club de Bruxelles
	FW	(Belgium) Hilaire Spanoghe				(Royal Belgian Football Association) Skill F.C. de Bruxelles
	FW	(England) (Belgium) Eric Thornton				(Royal Belgian Football Association) Léopold Club de Bruxelles
	MF	(Belgium) Camille Van Hoorden				(Royal Belgian Football Association) Racing Club de Bruxelles

Pos	Team	Pld	W	D	L	GF	GA	GD	Pts
1	(United Kingdom) Upton Park	1	1	0	0	4	0	+4	2
2	(France) Club Français	2	1	0	1	6	6	0	2
3	(Belgium) Université de Bruxelles	1	0	0	1	2	6	−4	0

Match 2

23 September 1900

Club Français (France)	6–2	(Belgium) Université de Bruxelles
Peltier 1' (?); Lambert (?) ? (?)	Report	Spanoghe (?) van Heuckelum (?)

Vélodrome de Vincennes, Paris
Attendance: 1,500
Referee: Jack Wood (Great Britain)

Team details

Club Français	Université de Bruxelles

GK	Lucien Huteau
RB	Louis Bach
LB	Pierre Allemane
RH	Virgile Gaillard
CH	Alfred Bloch
LH	Maurice Macaire
OR	René Ressejac-Duparc
IR	René Garnier (capt.)
CF	Gaston Peltier
IL	Marcel Lambert
OL	Fernand Canelle

GK	(United Kingdom) Eric Thornton
RB	(Belgium) Marius Delbecque
LB	(Netherlands) Hendrik van Heuckelum
RH	(Belgium) Lucien Londot
CH	(Belgium) Ernest Moreau de Melen
LH	(Belgium) Raul Kelecom
OR	(Belgium) Eugène "Edmond" Neefs
IR	(Belgium) Camille Van Hoorden
CF	(Belgium) Gustave Pelgrims (capt.)
IL	(Belgium) Alphonse Renier
OL	(Belgium) Hilaire Spanoghe

== Gymnastics ==
Belgium's inaugural Olympic appearance included competing in the gymnastics portion of the program.

Athlete	Event	Score	Rank
Michelet	Men's artistic individual all-around	192	12
De Poorten	Men's artistic individual all-around	207	99

== Rowing ==
Belgium, through the Royal Club Nautique de Gand, sent a coxed pair and an eight to the first Olympic rowing competition.

Athlete	Event	Heat		Semifinal		Final	
Athlete	Event	Time	Rank	Time	Rank	Time	Rank
Royal Club Nautique de Gand; Prosper Bruggeman; Maurice Hemelsoet unknown cox	Men's coxed pair	7:00.4	3	—N/a		Did not advance	
Royal Club Nautique de Gand; Jules De Bisschop; Prosper Bruggeman; Oscar Dessomville; Oscar De Cock; Maurice Hemelsoet; Marcel Van Crombrugge; Frank Odberg; Maurice Verdonck; Rodolphe Poma	Men's eight	5:00.2	2Q	—N/a		6:13.8	2nd place, silver medalist(s)

== Shooting ==
Belgium's first Olympic appearance included competing in the shooting events. Belgian shooters competed in the military pistol and military rifle sets of events.

Athlete	Event	Final	
Athlete	Event	Score	Rank
Pierre Eichhorn	Men's 50 metre free pistol	345	17
Charles Lebègue	Men's 50 metre free pistol	318	19
Victor Robert	Men's 50 metre free pistol	351	16
Alban Rooman	Men's 50 metre free pistol	405	13
Émile Thèves	Men's 50 metre free pistol	404	14
Alban Rooman; Émile Thèves; Victor Robert; Pierre Eichhorn; Charles Lebègue	Men's 50 metre free pistol, team	1823	4
Paul Van Asbroeck	Men's 300 metre free rifle, standing	297	4
Joseph Baras	Men's 300 metre free rifle, standing	233	30
Jules Bury	Men's 300 metre free rifle, standing	282	=7
Edouard Myin	Men's 300 metre free rifle, standing	265	21
Charles Paumier	Men's 300 metre free rifle, standing	298	3rd place, bronze medalist(s)
Paul Van Asbroeck	Men's 300 metre free rifle, kneeling	308	4
Joseph Baras	Men's 300 metre free rifle, kneeling	210	30
Jules Bury	Men's 300 metre free rifle, kneeling	269	24
Edouard Myin	Men's 300 metre free rifle, kneeling	249	29
Charles Paumier	Men's 300 metre free rifle, kneeling	297	=9
Paul Van Asbroeck	Men's 300 metre free rifle, prone	312	=8
Joseph Baras	Men's 300 metre free rifle, prone	270	=28
Jules Bury	Men's 300 metre free rifle, prone	270	=28
Edouard Myin	Men's 300 metre free rifle, prone	304	13
Charles Paumier	Men's 300 metre free rifle, prone	302	15
Paul Van Asbroeck	Men's 300 metre free rifle, three positions	917	3rd place, bronze medalist(s)
Joseph Baras	Men's 300 metre free rifle, three positions	713	30
Jules Bury	Men's 300 metre free rifle, three positions	821	22
Edouard Myin	Men's 300 metre free rifle, three positions	818	23
Charles Paumier	Men's 300 metre free rifle, three positions	897	6
Paul Van Asbroeck; Charles Paumier; Jules Bury; Edouard Myin; Joseph Baras	Men's 300 metre free rifle, team	4166	6
René Guyot	Men's trap	17	2nd place, silver medalist(s)

== Swimming ==
A man with the surname Hermand was Belgium's first Olympic swimmer. He competed in the 4000 metre freestyle but did not finish his first round heat.

Athlete	Event	Heat		Final	
Athlete	Event	Time	Rank	Time	Rank
Fernand Feyaerts	200 m freestyle	DNS		Did not advance	
Fernand Feyaerts	1000 m freestyle	DNS		Did not advance	
Fernand Feyaerts	4000 m freestyle	DNS		Did not advance	
Hermand	4000 m freestyle	DNF		Did not advance	

== Water polo ==
Brussels Swimming and Water Polo Club represented Belgium in this event.

Summary

Key:
- FT – After full time.
- P – Match decided by penalty-shootout.

Team	Event	Quarterfinals	Semifinal	Final	
Team	Event	Opposition Score	Opposition Score	Opposition Score	Rank
Brussels Water Polo Club	Men's tournament	Pupilles de Neptune de Lille #1 (FRA); W 2–0	Libellule de Paris (FRA); W 5–1	Osborne Swimming Club of Manchester (ZZX); L 7–2	2nd place, silver medalist(s)

Roster

Athlete	Event	Rank
Jean de Backer; Victor de Behr; Henri Cohen; Fernand Feyaerts; Oscar Grégoire; Albert Michant; Georges Romer; Guillaume Séron; Victor Sonnemans; A. R. Upton	Water polo	2nd place, silver medalist(s)

First round

11 August 1900	Brussels Swimming and Water Polo Club (Belgium)	2–0	(France) Pupilles de Neptune de Lille #1	Seine, Paris

Semi-finals

12 August 1900	Brussels Swimming and Water Polo Club (Belgium)	5–1	Libellule de Paris (France)	Seine, Paris

Final

12 August 1900	Brussels Swimming and Water Polo Club (Belgium)	2–7	Osborne Swimming Club of Manchester (United Kingdom)	Seine, Paris
