= Archery at the 1900 Summer Olympics – Sur la Perche à la Pyramide =

Archery at the Olympics

Sur la Perche à la Pyramide at the Games of the II Olympiad
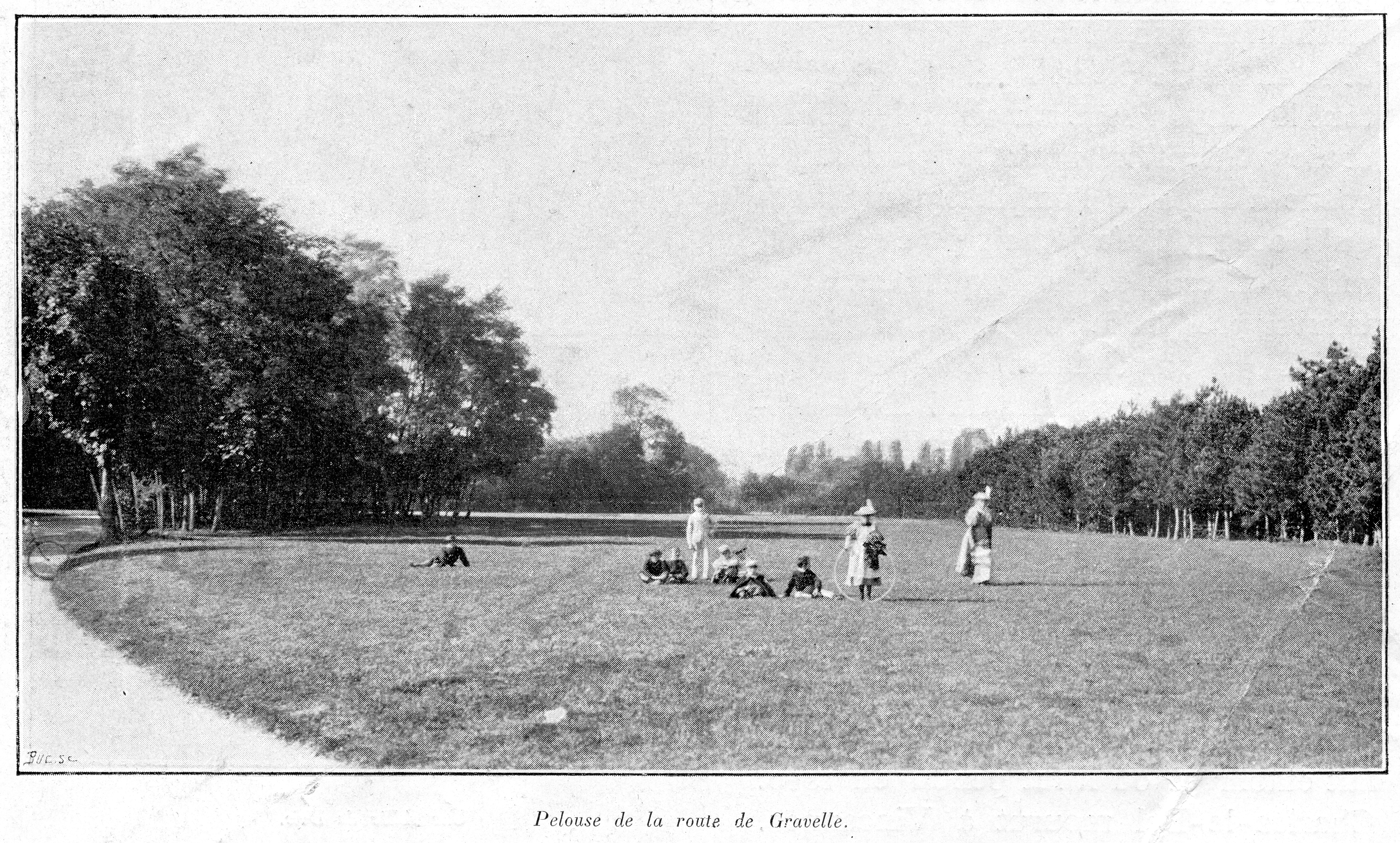
- Contemporary photograph of the Bois de Vincennes, where the event took place
- Venue: Bois de Vincennes
- Dates: 15–16 July
- Competitors: 129 from 3 nations

Medalists
1st place, gold medalist(s)		Emile Grumiaux	France
2nd place, silver medalist(s)		Auguste Serrurier	France
3rd place, bronze medalist(s)		Louis Glineux	Belgium

The Sur la Perche à la Pyramide event was part of the archery programme at the 1900 Summer Olympics. Only the names of the three top placers are known.

There were at most 126 other competitors in this event, as 129 archers competed in the two "à la perche" events. However, whether all of those archers entered both events or not (and if not, how many actually did contest each) is unknown. The event was contested on 15 and 16 July 1900. The Netherlands likely had archers in the event; 6 Dutch archers competed in the 1900 Olympic archery events though which events they entered specifically is unknown.

== Background ==
This was the only appearance of the men's Sur La Perche À La Pyramide.

== Competition format ==
Little is known about the format of the competition, other than that the targets were on poles at 28 metres, and that it may be related to Popinjay archery, where the archer must hit a small bird shaped target from an elevated pole.

== Schedule ==
Date	Time	Round
Sunday, 15 July 1900; Monday, 16 July 1900		Final

== Results ==
Rank	Archer	Nation	Score
1st place, gold medalist(s)	Emile Grumiaux	France	Unknown
2nd place, silver medalist(s)	Auguste Serrurier	France	Unknown
3rd place, bronze medalist(s)	Louis Glineur	Belgium	Unknown
4–129?	Unknown competitors	Unknown	Unknown
