= Archery at the 1900 Summer Olympics – Au Cordon Doré 33 metres =

Archery at the Olympics

33 metre Au Cordon Doré at the Games of the II Olympiad
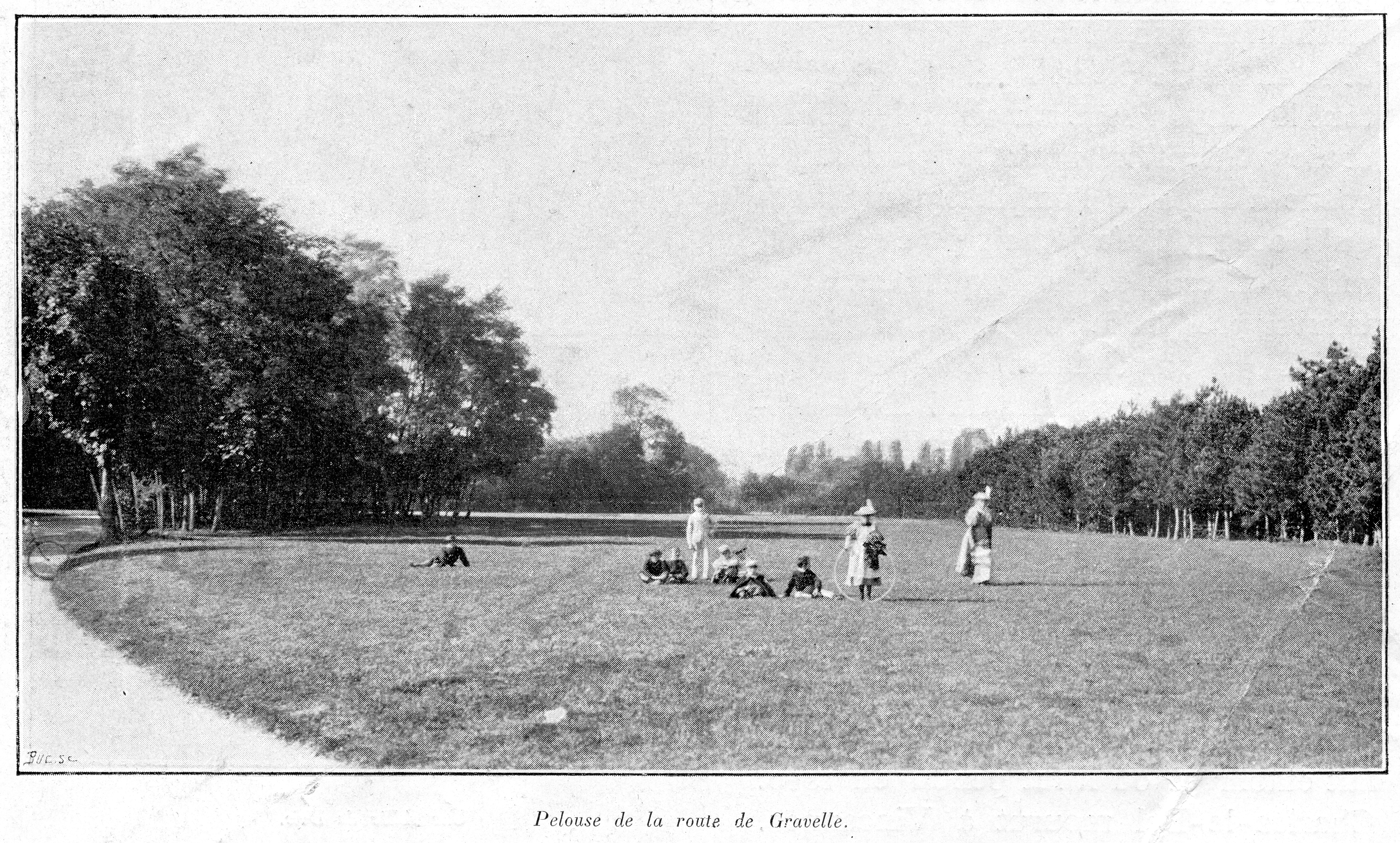
- Contemporary photograph of the Bois de Vincennes, where the event took place
- Venue: Bois de Vincennes
- Date: 14 August
- Competitors: 8 from 2 nations

Medalists
1st place, gold medalist(s)		Hubert Van Innis	Belgium
2nd place, silver medalist(s)		Victor Thibaud	France
3rd place, bronze medalist(s)		Charles Frédéric Petit	France

The Au Cordon Doré at 33 metres event was part of the archery programme at the 1900 Summer Olympics. Qualification for the event was through the large open team events, with the top eight individual archers competing in the individual competition. The identities of the top three archers are the only ones known. No scores are recorded for any of the archers.

== Background ==
This was the only appearance of the men's Au Cordon Doré at 33 metres. A 50 metres version was also held in 1900.

== Competition format ==
Little is known about the format of the competition.

== Schedule ==
Date	Time	Round
Tuesday, 14 August 1900		Final

== Results ==
Rank	Archer	Nation	Score
1st place, gold medalist(s)	Hubert Van Innis	Belgium	Unknown
2nd place, silver medalist(s)	Victor Thibaud	France	Unknown
3rd place, bronze medalist(s)	Charles Frédéric Petit	France	Unknown
4–8	Unknown competitors	Unknown	Unknown
