= Archery at the 1900 Summer Olympics – Championnat du Monde =

Archery programme, held in Paris

Au Berceau Championnat du Monde at the Games of the II Olympiad
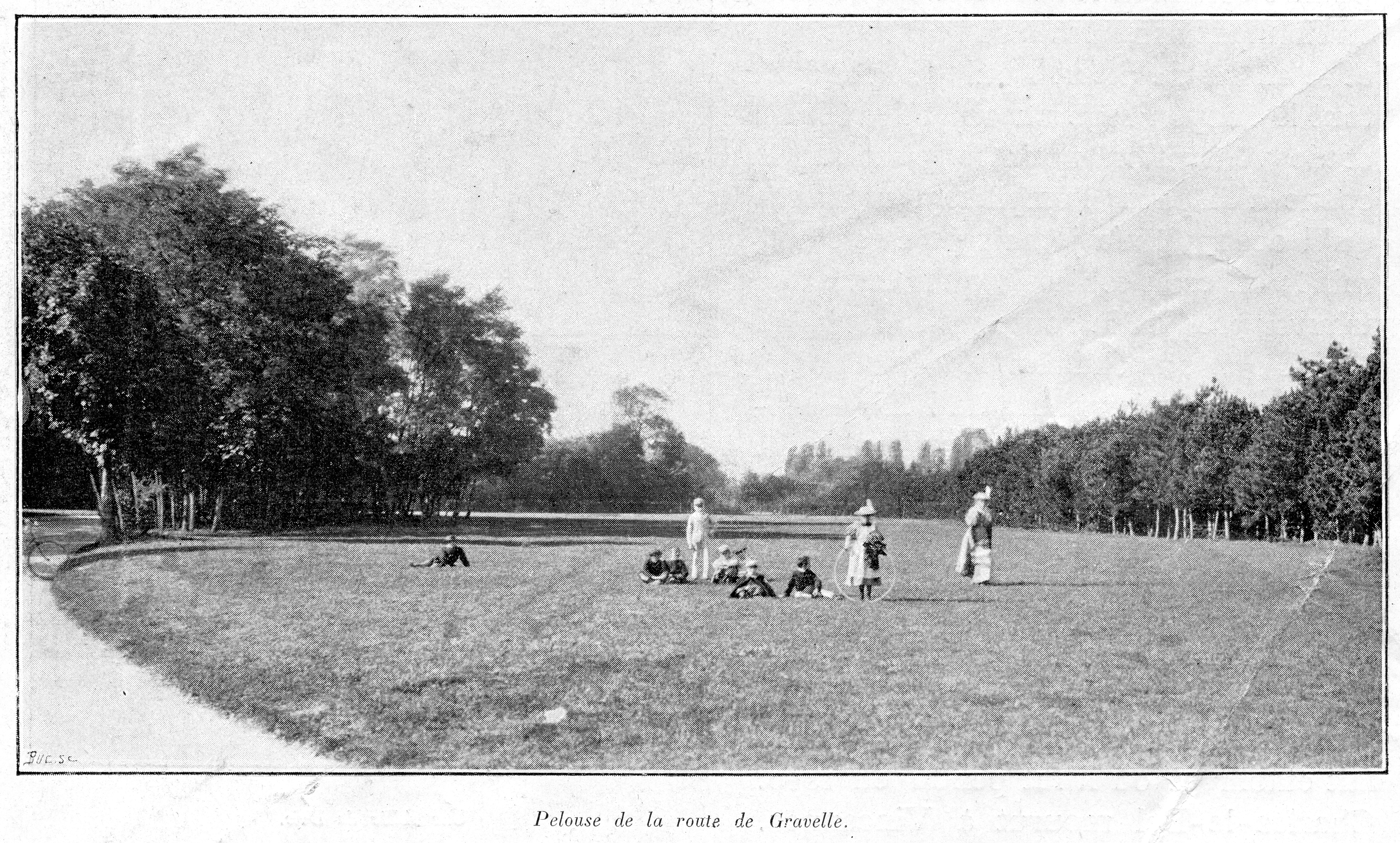
- Contemporary photograph of the Bois de Vincennes, where the event took place
- Venue: Bois de Vincennes
- Date: 1 August
- Competitors: 2 from 2 nations

Medalists
1st place, gold medalist(s)		Henri Hérouin	France
2nd place, silver medalist(s)		Hubert Van Innis	Belgium

The Au Berceau Championnat du Monde event was part of the archery programme at the 1900 Summer Olympics. Qualification for the event was through the individual competitions in the earlier Au Berceau events: Au Chapelet and Au Cordon Doré.

== Background ==
This was the only appearance of the men's Championnat du Monde.

== Competition format ==
Little is known about the format of the competition.

== Schedule ==
Date	Time	Round
Wednesday, 1 August 1900		Final

== Results ==
Rank	Archer	Nation	Score
1st place, gold medalist(s)	Henri Hérouin	France	22
2nd place, silver medalist(s)	Hubert Van Innis	Belgium	16
