= Grumiaux (surname) =

Grumiaux is a surname of French origin. People with that name include:

- Arthur Grumiaux (1921–1986), Belgian violinist and pianist
- Émile Grumiaux (1861–1932), French archer

== See also ==
- 4571 Grumiaux (1985 RY3), a Main-belt Asteroid discovered in 1985
