= Archery at the 1900 Summer Olympics – Au Chapelet 50 metres =

Archery at the Olympics

50 metre Au Chapelet at the Games of the II Olympiad
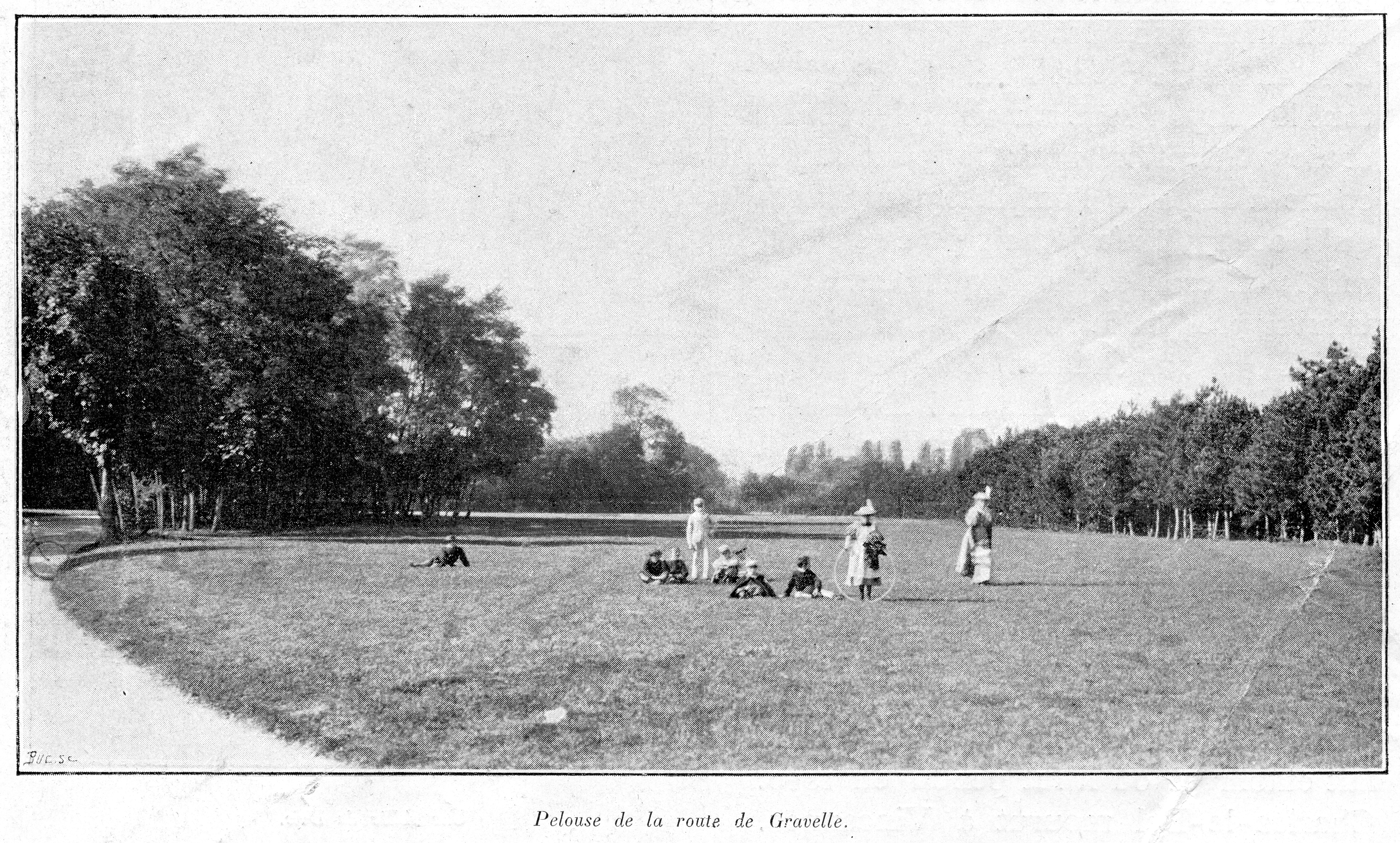
- Contemporary photograph of the Bois de Vincennes, where the event took place
- Venue: Bois de Vincennes
- Date: 14 August
- Competitors: 6 from 2 nations

Medalists
1st place, gold medalist(s)		Eugène Mougin	France
2nd place, silver medalist(s)		Henri Helle	France
3rd place, bronze medalist(s)		Émile Mercier	France

The Au Chapelet at 50 metres event was part of the archery programme at the 1900 Summer Olympics. Qualification for the event was through the large open team events, with the top six individual archers competing in the individual competition. The identities of the fifth and sixth place archers are unknown. All of the scores are unknown.

== Background ==
This was the only appearance of the men's Au Chapelet at 50 metres. A 33 metres version was also held in 1900.

== Competition format ==
Little is known about the format of the competition.

== Schedule ==
Date	Time	Round
Tuesday, 14 August 1900		Final

== Results ==
Rank	Archer	Nation	Score
1st place, gold medalist(s)	Eugène Mougin	France	Unknown
2nd place, silver medalist(s)	Henri Helle	France	Unknown
3rd place, bronze medalist(s)	Émile Mercier	France	Unknown
4	Hubert Van Innis	Belgium	Unknown
5–6	Unknown competitors	Unknown	Unknown
