= Sonnemans =

Sonnemans is a surname. Notable people with the surname include:

- Ben Sonnemans (born 1972), Dutch judoka
- Victor Sonnemans (1874–1962), Belgian Olympic water polo player
