= Emile Mercier =

Emile Mercier may refer to:

- Émile Mercier (archer), French archer and Olympian
- Emile Mercier (cartoonist) (1901–1981), Australian cartoonist
