= Véronne =

- Part of Saillans
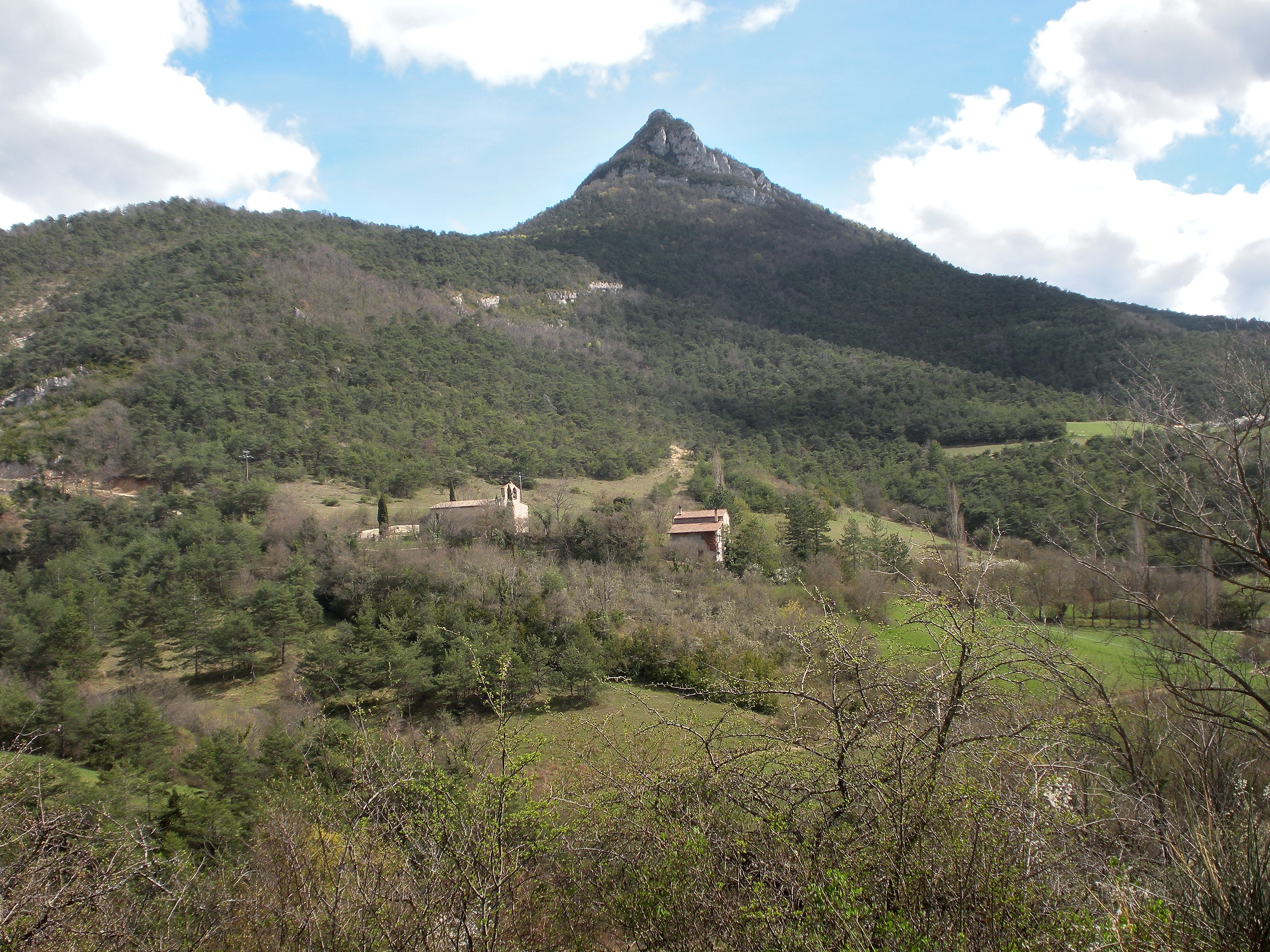
- The church of Véronne and its surroundings
- Location of Véronne
- Location within France Location within Auvergne-Rhône-Alpes
- Coordinates: 44°44′10″N 5°12′32″E
- Country: France
- Region: Auvergne-Rhône-Alpes
- Department: Drôme
- Arrondissement: Die
- Canton: Le Diois
- Intercommunality: Crestois et Pays de Saillans Cœur de Drôme
- Commune: Saillans
- Area^{1}: 21.31 km^{2} (8.23 sq mi)
- Elevation: 339 m (1,112 ft)
- Highest elevation: 1,109 m (3,638 ft)
- Lowest elevation: 314 m (1,030 ft)
- Population (2022): 38
  - Density: 1.8/km^{2} (4.6/sq mi)
- Time zone: UTC+01:00 (CET)
  - Summer (DST): UTC+02:00 (CEST)
- Postal code: 26340
- ^{1} French Land Register data, which excludes lakes, ponds, glaciers > 1 km^{2} (0.386 sq mi or 247 acres) and river estuaries.

Véronne (French pronunciation: [veʁɔn]) is a former commune in the Drôme department in southeastern France. On 1 January 2025, it was merged into the commune of Saillans.

== Population ==
Historical population
Year	Pop.	±% p.a.
1968	58	—
1975	44	−3.87%
1982	13	−15.99%
1990	39	+14.72%
1999	37	−0.58%
2009	40	+0.78%
2014	41	+0.50%
2020	44	+1.18%
Source: INSEE

== See also ==
- Communes of the Drôme department
