= Émile Druart =

Belgian archer

Olympic medal record

Men's Archery
Silver medal – second place	1900 Paris	Sur la Perche à la Herse

Émile Druart Jr. was a Belgian competitor in the sport of archery. Druart competed in one event, taking second place in the Sur la Perche à la Herse competition. He is now considered by the International Olympic Committee to have won a silver medal. No scores are known from that competition, though it is known that Druart tied with Auguste Serrurier and both are silver medallists.

== See also ==
- Archery at the 1900 Summer Olympics

== Notes ==
1. - Prizes at the time were silver medals for first place and bronze medals for second, as well as usually including cash awards. The current gold, silver, bronze medal system was initiated at the 1904 Summer Olympics. The International Olympic Committee has retroactively assigned medals in the current system to top three placers at early Olympics.
