= Victor Thibault =

French archer (1867–1941)

Olympic medal record

Men's Archery
Silver medal – second place	1900 Paris	Au Cordon Doré 33 metres
Silver medal – second place	1900 Paris	Au Chapelet 33 metres

Victor Thibault (8 March 1867 in Paris – 3 May 1941 in Saillans, Drôme) was a French competitor in the sport of archery. Thibault competed in two events at the 1900 Summer Olympics, and won second prize in each. He is now considered by the International Olympic Committee to have won two silver medals. Both of Thibault's events were the shorter 33 metre competitions, in both the Au Chapelet and Au Cordon Doré style.

== Notes ==
1. Prizes at the time were silver medals for first place and bronze medals for second, as well as usually including cash awards. The current gold, silver, bronze medal system was initiated at the 1904 Summer Olympics. The International Olympic Committee has retroactively assigned medals in the current system to top three placers at early Olympics.
