= Émile Grumiaux =

French archer (1861–1932)

Olympic medal record

Men's archery

Representing France
Gold medal – first place	1900 Paris	Sur la Perche à la Pyramide

Émile Grumiaux (11 June 1861 in Boussu – 18 May 1932 in Liévin) was a French competitor in the sport of archery. Grumiaux competed in one event, winning the Sur la Perche à la Pyramide competition. He is now considered by the International Olympic Committee to have won a gold medal. No scores from that competition are known.

== See also ==
- Archery at the 1900 Summer Olympics

== Notes ==
1. - Prizes at the time were silver medals for first place and bronze medals for second, as well as usually including cash awards. The current gold, silver, bronze medal system was initiated at the 1904 Summer Olympics. The International Olympic Committee has retroactively assigned medals in the current system to top three placers at early Olympics.

== Sources ==
- International Olympic Committee medal winners database
- Mallon, Bill (1998). The 1900 Olympic Games, Results for All Competitors in All Events, with Commentary. Jefferson, North Carolina: McFarland & Company, Inc., Publishers. ISBN 0-7864-0378-0.
- Émile Grumiaux at Olympics at Sports-Reference.com (archived)
