= Jean De Backer =

Belgian water polo player (??–??)

Personal information
- Nationality: Belgian

Sport
- Sport: Water polo
- Team: Brussels Swimming Club
Medal record
Representing Belgium
Men's water polo
| Silver medal – second place | 1900 Paris | Team competition |

Jean De Backer was a Belgian athlete who mainly participated in the water polo event.

Backer competed for the Brussels Swimming and Water Polo Club, and the team was selected to represent Belgium at the 1900 Summer Olympics in Paris, France, the team won a silver medal after losing in the final against the Osborne Swimming club which represented the Great Britain, but this came after the Belgium team had beaten two French sides in the previous rounds.

== See also ==
- List of Olympic medalists in water polo (men)
