= Victor De Behr =

Belgian water polo player (1865–1907)

Personal information
- Nationality: Belgian
- Born: 20 April 1865
- Died: 23 March 1907 (aged 41)

Sport
- Sport: Water polo
- Team: Brussels Swimming Club
Medal record
Representing Belgium
Men's water polo
Silver medal – second place	1900 Paris	Team competition

Victor De Behr (20 April 1865 – 23 March 1907) was a Belgian athlete whose main event was water polo.

Behr competed for the Brussels Swimming and Water Polo Club, and the team was selected to represent Belgium at the 1900 Summer Olympics in Paris, France. The team won a silver medal after losing in the final against the Osborne Swimming club which represented the Great Britain, but this came after the Belgium team had beaten two French sides in the previous rounds. In the 1890s, Behr became the club's treasurer.

== See also ==
- List of Olympic medalists in water polo (men)
