= Emmanuel Foulon =

Belgian archer (1871–1945)

Olympic medal record

Men's Archery
Gold medal – first place	1900 Paris	Sur la Perche à la Herse

Emmanuel Foulon (29 December 1871 in Frameries – 22 July 1945 in Frameries) was a Belgian competitor in the sport of archery. Foulon competed in one event, winning the Sur la Perche à la Herse. He is now considered by the International Olympic Committee to have won a gold medal. No scores are known from that competition.

== See also ==
- Archery at the 1900 Summer Olympics

== Notes ==
1. - Prizes at the time were silver medals for first place and bronze medals for second, as well as usually including cash awards. The current gold, silver, bronze medal system was initiated at the 1904 Summer Olympics. The International Olympic Committee has retroactively assigned medals in the current system to top three placers at early Olympics.
