= Archery at the 1920 Summer Olympics – Individual moving bird, 33 metres =

Archery at the Olympics

Men's moving bird at 33 metres at the Games of the VII Olympiad
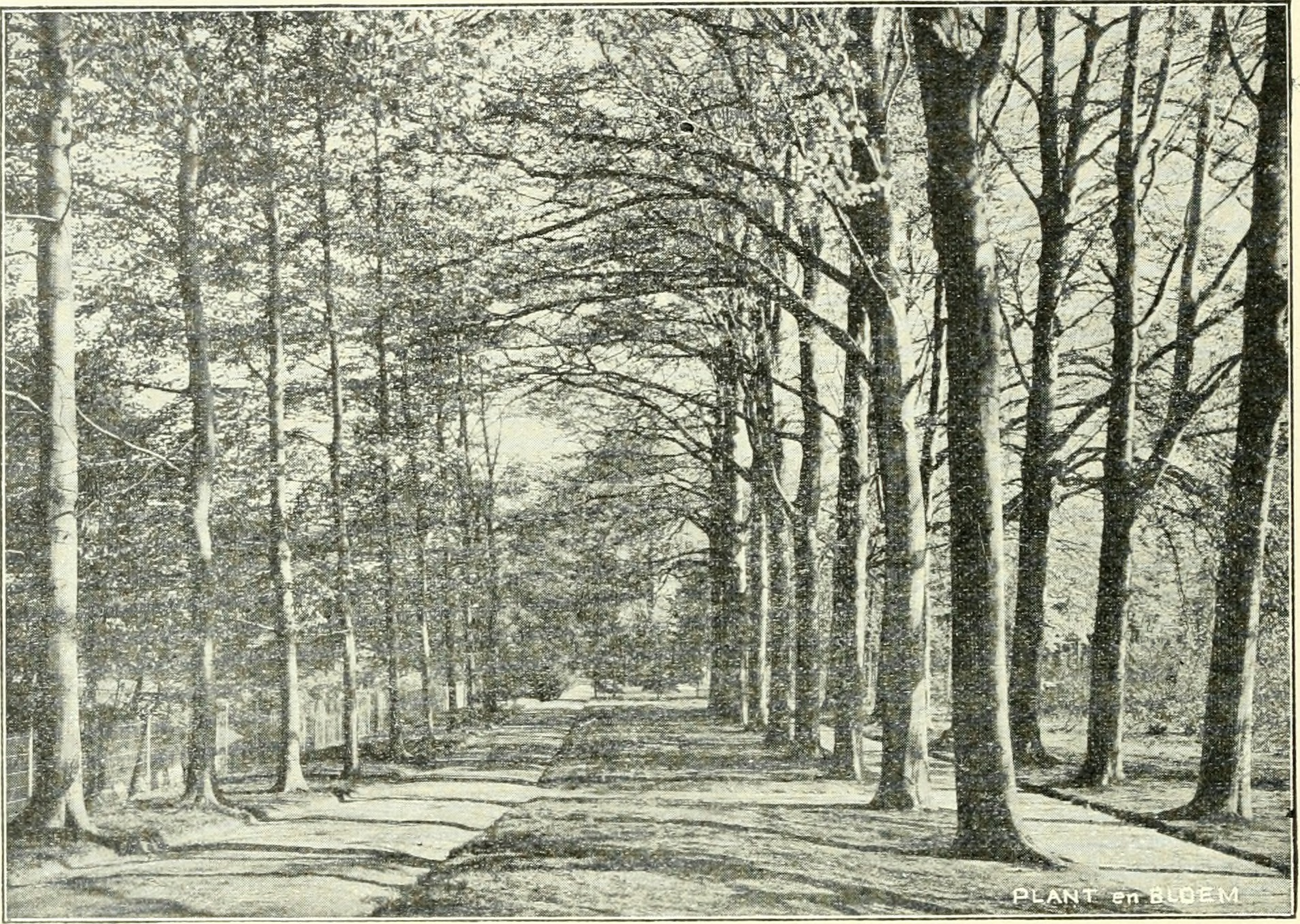
- Contemporary photograph of Nachtegalen Park, where the event took place
- Venue: Nachtegalen Park
- Dates: 4–5 August
- Competitors: 2 from 2 nations

Medalists
1st place, gold medalist(s)		Hubert Van Innis	Belgium
2nd place, silver medalist(s)		Julien Brulé	France

The individual moving bird at 33 metres event was part of the archery programme at the 1920 Summer Olympics. The event, like all other archery events in 1920, was open only to men. Only two archers competed.

== Results ==
Place	Archer	Score
1st place, gold medalist(s)	Hubert Van Innis (BEL)	139
2nd place, silver medalist(s)	Julien Brulé (FRA)	94

== Sources ==
- Belgium Olympic Committee (1957). Olympic Games Antwerp 1920: Official Report (in French).
- Wudarski, Pawel (1999). "Wyniki Igrzysk Olimpijskich" (in Polish).
