= Auguste Serrurier =

French archer (1857–1921)

Olympic medal record

Men's Archery
Silver medal – second place	1900 Paris	Sur la Perche à la Herse
Silver medal – second place	1900 Paris	Sur la Perche à la Pyramide

Auguste Serrurier (25 March 1857 in Denain — 21 March 1921 in Denain) was a French competitor in the sport of archery. Serrurier competed in two events, taking second place in both the Sur la Perche à la Herse and the Sur la Perche à la Pyramide competitions. He is now considered by the International Olympic Committee to have won two silver medals. No scores are known from those competitions, though it is known that Serrurier tied with Emile Druart for second in the à la Herse event, and both are silver medallists.

== See also ==
- Archery at the 1900 Summer Olympics

== Notes ==
1. - Prizes at the time were silver medals for first place and bronze medals for second, as well as usually including cash awards. The current gold, silver, bronze medal system was initiated at the 1904 Summer Olympics. The International Olympic Committee has retroactively assigned medals in the current system to top three placers at early Olympics.
