= Hubert Van Innis =

Belgian archer

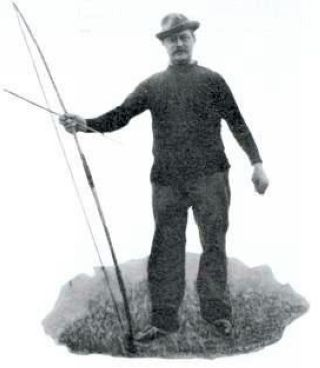

Personal information
- Full name: Gerardus Theodorus Hubertus Van Innis
- Born: 24 February 1866 Elewijt, Belgium
- Died: 25 November 1961 (aged 95) Zemst, Belgium

Sport
- Country: Belgium
- Sport: Archery
Medal record
Olympic Games
Gold medal – first place	1900 Paris	Cordon Doré 33 m
Gold medal – first place	1900 Paris	Chapelet 33 m
Gold medal – first place	1920 Antwerp	Moving Bird 28 m
Gold medal – first place	1920 Antwerp	Moving Bird 33 m
Gold medal – first place	1920 Antwerp	Moving Bird 33 m Team
Gold medal – first place	1920 Antwerp	Moving Bird 50 m Team
Silver medal – second place	1900 Paris	Cordon Doré 50 m
Silver medal – second place	1920 Antwerp	Moving Bird 50 m
Silver medal – second place	1920 Antwerp	Moving Bird 28 m Team

Gerard Theodor Hubert Van Innis (24 February 1866 – 25 November 1961) was a Belgian competitor in the sport of archery; he competed in two Summer Olympics 20 years apart and came away with a total of six gold medals and three silver medals.

As a young boy, the story goes he was forced to work as a milk delivery boy in the villages around Brussels, and at the end of his deliveries he would send his dog and cart home while he went off to practice his archery skills.

When he was 13 years old, he won the first prize in a main competition in Antwerp. He also won the prize in 1893, 1894, 1895 and 1896. In 1881, he won the royan prize of Roozendaal.

Van Innis was 34 years old when he competed at the 1900 Summer Olympics held in Paris, France. He entered four events; he won gold medals in the Au Cordon Doré 33 metres and the Au Chapelet 33 metres events, and he also came second behind Frenchman Henri Hérouin in the Au Cordon Doré 50 metres. His worst result of the Games was a fourth place in the Au Chapelet 50 metres.

Van Innis had to wait another twenty years before competing on the Olympic stage. Aged 54, he entered the 1920 Summer Olympics held on his home soil in Antwerp, Belgium, where he added to his medal tally with two more individual gold medals in the Individual moving bird, 28 metres, beating Frenchman Léonce Quentin (his only competitor in this event) and the Individual moving bird, 33 metres. He then lost to Frenchman Julien Brulé in the Individual moving bird, 50 metres, to win a silver medal. He also added three team medals with two more golds in the Team moving bird, 50 metres; Team moving bird, 33 metres; and a silver medal in the Team moving bird, 28 metres. His final Olympic medal tally was six gold medals and three silver medals.

Unbelievably—when aged 67 years old, 13 years after his final Olympic victories—he went on to win in the 1933 World Championships.

His legacy has continued through his family; his great-grandson Philippe Prieels has competed in the World Archery Championships, and his great-great-granddaughter Sarah Prieels has also competed in the World Archery Championships.

== See also ==
- Archery at the 1900 Summer Olympics
- List of multiple Olympic gold medalists at a single Games
- List of multiple Summer Olympic medalists
