= Saillans, Drôme =

Saillans
- Commune
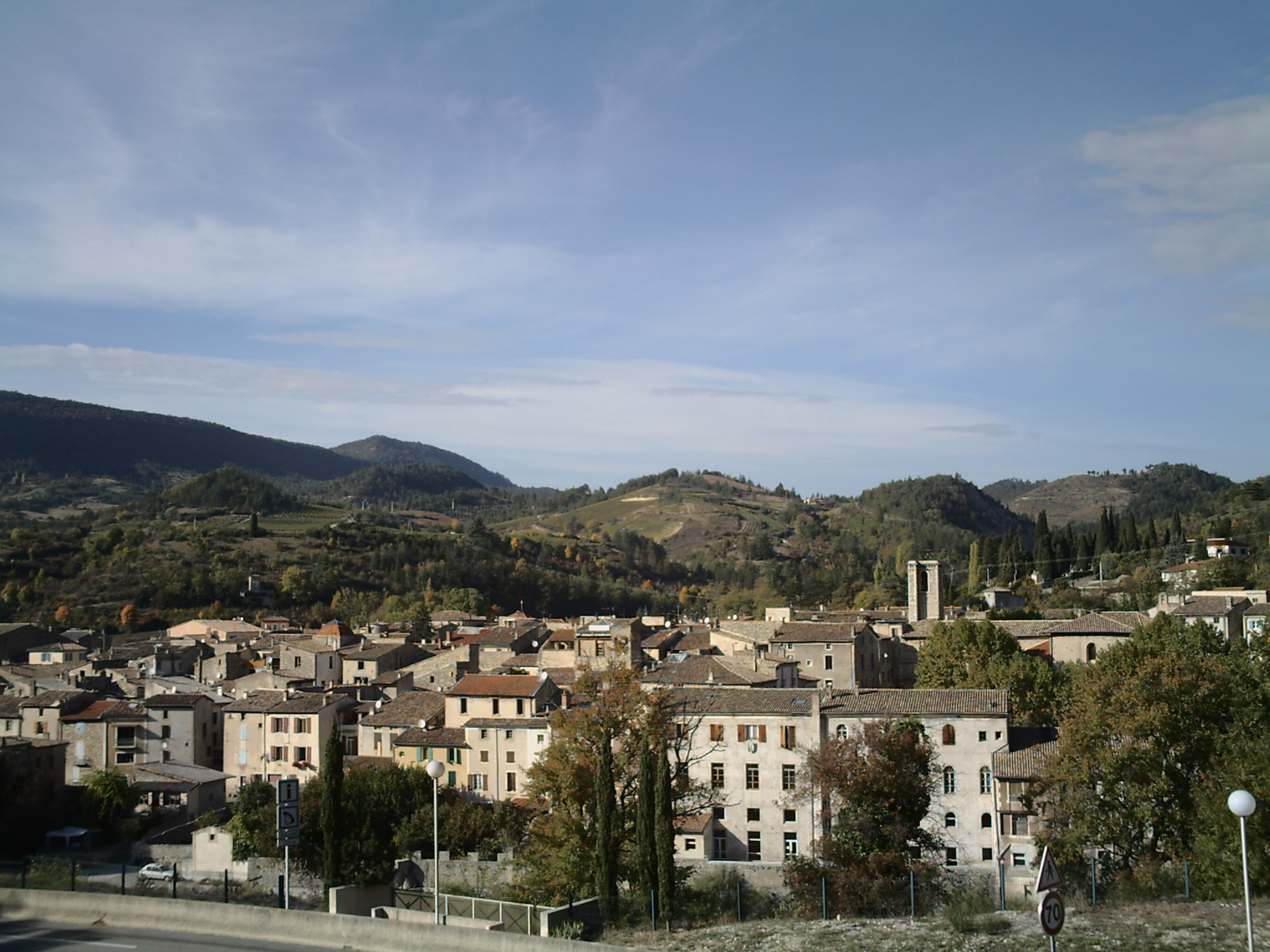
- A general view of Saillans

- Coat of arms
- Location of Saillans
- Location within France Location within Auvergne-Rhône-Alpes
- Coordinates: 44°41′51″N 5°11′53″E
- Country: France
- Region: Auvergne-Rhône-Alpes
- Department: Drôme
- Arrondissement: Die
- Canton: Le Diois

Government
  - Mayor (2025–2026): François Brocard
- Area^{1}: 36.15 km^{2} (13.96 sq mi)
- Elevation: 27 m (89 ft)
- Highest elevation: 918 m (3,012 ft)
- Lowest elevation: 232 m (761 ft)
- Population (2023): 1,460
  - Density: 40.4/km^{2} (105/sq mi)
- Time zone: UTC+01:00 (CET)
  - Summer (DST): UTC+02:00 (CEST)
- INSEE/Postal code: 26289 /26340
- ^{1} French Land Register data, which excludes lakes, ponds, glaciers > 1 km^{2} (0.386 sq mi or 247 acres) and river estuaries.

Saillans (French pronunciation: [sajɑ̃]; Occitan: Salhens) is a commune in the Drôme department in southeastern France. On 1 January 2025, the former commune of Véronne was merged into Saillans.

== Population ==
Historical population
Year	Pop.	±% p.a.
1968	1,022	—
1975	878	−2.15%
1982	917	+0.62%
1990	872	−0.63%
1999	905	+0.41%
2007	1,048	+1.85%
2012	1,248	+3.55%
2017	1,324	+1.19%
2023	1,460	+1.64%
Source: INSEE

== See also ==
- Communes of the Drôme department
