= Charles Frédéric Petit =

French archer (1857–1947)

Olympic medal record

Men's Archery
Bronze medal – third place	1900 Paris	Au Cordon Doré 33 metres
Bronze medal – third place	1900 Paris	Au Chapelet 33 metres

Charles Frédéric Petit (French: [ʃaʁl fʁedeʁik pəti]; 6 May 1857 – 19 February 1947) was a French competitor in the sport of archery. Petit competed in two events and won third prize in each. He is now considered by the International Olympic Committee to have won two bronze medals. Both of Petit's events were the shorter 33 metre competitions, in both the Au Chapelet and Au Cordon Doré style.

== See also ==
- Archery at the 1900 Summer Olympics

== Notes ==
1. - Prizes at the time were silver medals for first place and bronze medals for second, as well as usually including cash awards. The current gold, silver, bronze medal system was initiated at the 1904 Summer Olympics. The International Olympic Committee has retroactively assigned medals in the current system to top three placers at early Olympics.
