= Émile Mercier (archer) =

French archer

Olympic medal record

Men's Archery
Bronze medal – third place	1900 Paris	Au Chapelet 50 metres

Émile Mercier (16 November 1844 – 22 April 1921) was a French competitor in the sport of archery. Mercier competed in one event, taking third place in the 50 metre Au Chapelet competition. The International Olympic Committee now consider him to have won a bronze medal. The scores are unknown from that competition.

== See also ==
- Archery at the 1900 Summer Olympics

== Notes ==
1. - Prizes at the time were silver medals for first place and bronze medals for second, as well as usually including cash awards. The current gold, silver, bronze medal system was initiated at the 1904 Summer Olympics. The International Olympic Committee has retroactively assigned medals in the current system to the top three placers at the early Olympics.

== Sources ==
- International Olympic Committee medal winners database
- Mallon, Bill (1998). The 1900 Olympic Games, Results for All Competitors in All Events, with Commentary. McFarland & Company, Inc.
