= Louis Glineur =

Belgian archer

- Born: 10 December 1849; Dour, Belgium
- Died: unknown
- Occupation: archer
- Known for: 1900 Summer Olympics

Olympic medal record

Men's Archery
Bronze medal – third place	1900 Paris	Sur la Perche à la Pyramide

Louis Edouard Albert Glineur (born 10 December 1849, date of death unknown) was a Belgian competitor in the sport of archery. Glineur competed in one event, taking third place in the Sur la Perche à la Pyramide competition. He is now considered by the International Olympic Committee to have won a bronze medal. No scores are known from that competition.

== See also ==
- Archery at the 1900 Summer Olympics

== Notes ==
1. – Prizes at the time were silver medals for first place and bronze medals for second, as well as usually including cash awards. The current gold, silver, bronze medal system was initiated at the 1904 Summer Olympics. The International Olympic Committee has retroactively assigned medals in the current system to top three placers at early Olympics.
