= Henri Cohen (water polo) =

Water polo player

Personal information
- Born: March 21, 1882 Brussels, Belgium
- Died: July 31, 1931 (aged 49) Paris, France

Sport
- Sport: Water polo
Medal record
Representing Belgium
Olympic Games
| Silver medal – second place | 1900 Paris | Team competition |

Henri Cohen (21 March 1882 – 31 July 1931) was a Belgian sportsman who specialized in water polo.

== See also ==
- List of Olympic medalists in water polo (men)
- List of select Jewish water polo players
