= Archery at the Summer Olympics =

- IOC Code: ARC
- Governing body: World Archery
- Events: 6 (men: 2; women: 2; mixed: 2)

Summer Olympics
- 1896; 1900; 1904; 1908; 1912; 1920; 1924; 1928; 1932; 1936; 1948; 1952; 1956; 1960; 1964; 1968; 1972; 1976; 1980; 1984; 1988; 1992; 1996; 2000; 2004; 2008; 2012; 2016; 2020; 2024; 2028; 2032
- Medalists; Records

Archery had its debut at the 1900 Summer Olympics and has been contested in 18 Olympics. 105 nations have competed in the Olympic archery events, with France appearing the most often at 15 times. The most noticeable trend has been the excellence of South Korean archers, who have won 32 out of 44 gold medals in archery events since 1984. Olympic archery is governed by the World Archery Federation (WA; formerly FITA). Until the 2024 Games, recurve archery has been the only discipline of archery featured at the Olympics. Compound archery will make its debut at the 2028 Games with a mixed team format. Archery is also an event at the Summer Paralympics.

== Summary ==
Key

Archery events not held
Olympic Games not held

| Games | Year | Events | Best Nation |
|---|---|---|---|
| 1 | | | |
| 2 | 1900 | 7 | France (1) |
| 3 | 1904 | 6 | United States (1) |
| 4 | 1908 | 3 | Great Britain (1) |
| 5 | | | |
| 6 | | | |
| 7 | 1920 | 10 | Belgium (1) |
| 8 | | | |
| 9 | | | |
| 10 | | | |
| 11 | | | |
| 12 | | | |
| 13 | | | |
| 14 | | | |
| 15 | | | |
| 16 | | | |

| Games | Year | Events | Best Nation |
|---|---|---|---|
| 17 | | | |
| 18 | | | |
| 19 | | | |
| 20 | 1972 | 2 | United States (2) |
| 21 | 1976 | 2 | United States (3) |
| 22 | 1980 | 2 | Soviet Union (1) |
| 23 | 1984 | 2 | United States (4) |
| 24 | 1988 | 4 | South Korea (1) |
| 25 | 1992 | 4 | South Korea (2) |
| 26 | 1996 | 4 | South Korea (3) |
| 27 | 2000 | 4 | South Korea (4) |
| 28 | 2004 | 4 | South Korea (5) |
| 29 | 2008 | 4 | South Korea (6) |
| 30 | 2012 | 4 | South Korea (7) |
| 31 | 2016 | 4 | South Korea (8) |
| 32 | 2020 | 5 | South Korea (9) |
| 33 | 2024 | 5 | South Korea (10) |
| 34 | 2028 | 6 | |

== History ==
The second Olympic Games, Paris 1900, saw the first appearance of archery. Seven men's disciplines in varying distances were contested. At the 1904 Summer Olympics in St. Louis, six archery events were contested, of which three were men's and three were women's competitions. Team archery was introduced, as was women's archery. At the 1908 Summer Olympics, three archery events were held. Archery was not featured at the 1912 Summer Olympics but reappeared in the 1920 Summer Olympics but only as a men's event.

Archery has appeared in the Olympics only eighteen times, as between 1920 and 1972 it was not included in the program. The archery competition featured at the 1972 Summer Olympics in Munich consisted of a double FITA Round (from 2014 known as a '1440 Round') competition with two events: men's individual and women's individual. This form of archery competition was held until the 1988 Summer Olympics, when team competition was added and the Grand FITA Round format was used. Starting at the 1992 Summer Olympics, the Olympic Round with head-to-head matches was adopted and has been used ever since.

In 1984 at Los Angeles, Neroli Fairhall of New Zealand was the first paraplegic competitor in the Olympic Games.

Since 2004, the archery competitions at the Olympic Games have often been held in iconic locations like the Panathinaikos Stadium (2004), Lord’s Cricket Ground (2012), and the Sambodromo (2016). In the 2024 Paris games, it took place outside the Hôtel des Invalides in the Esplanade.

In 2028 at Los Angeles, compound archery will also be contested, with a mixed team format.

== Medal table ==
Archery competitions in 1900, 1904, 1908, and 1920 years preceded the modern, standardized archery competition under the rules of the World Archery Federation. They were contested by three nations at most in any given year, and were dominated by home nations in both the number of participants and number of medals won. The nations that competed during that period were France, Belgium, the Netherlands, Great Britain, and the United States. In some events in Antwerp (1920) bronze medals were not awarded as only two nations competed.

1972 marked the beginning of the modern archery competition at the Olympic Games. The events began to use standardized forms and many nations competed.

This table includes archery competitions in 1900, 1904, 1908, and 1920 in addition to the ones from 1972 onward.

| Rank | Nation | Gold | Silver | Bronze | Total |
|---|---|---|---|---|---|
| 1 | South Korea | 32 | 10 | 8 | 50 |
| 2 | United States | 14 | 11 | 10 | 35 |
| 3 | Belgium | 11 | 7 | 3 | 21 |
| 4 | France | 7 | 12 | 8 | 27 |
| 5 | Italy | 2 | 3 | 4 | 9 |
| 6 | Great Britain | 2 | 2 | 5 | 9 |
| 7 | China | 1 | 7 | 2 | 10 |
| 8 | Soviet Union | 1 | 3 | 3 | 7 |
| 9 | Finland | 1 | 1 | 2 | 4 |
| 9 | Ukraine | 1 | 1 | 2 | 4 |
| 11 | Netherlands | 1 | 1 | 1 | 3 |
| 12 | Australia | 1 | 0 | 2 | 3 |
| 13 | Turkey | 1 | 0 | 1 | 2 |
| 14 | Spain | 1 | 0 | 0 | 1 |
| 15 | Japan | 0 | 3 | 4 | 7 |
| 16 | Germany | 0 | 3 | 2 | 5 |
| 17 | Chinese Taipei | 0 | 2 | 2 | 4 |
| 18 | ROC | 0 | 2 | 0 | 2 |
| 18 | Sweden | 0 | 2 | 0 | 2 |
| 20 | Mexico | 0 | 1 | 3 | 4 |
| 21 | Poland | 0 | 1 | 1 | 2 |
| 21 | Russia | 0 | 1 | 1 | 2 |
| 23 | Indonesia | 0 | 1 | 0 | 1 |
| 24 | Unified Team | 0 | 0 | 2 | 2 |
| Totals (24 entries) | | 76 | 74 | 66 | 216 |

== Qualification ==
Qualification spots in archery are allotted to National Olympic Committees rather than to individual athletes. The minimum age for an Olympic archer is 16, according to World Archery (The Federation for the sport). There are two ways an NOC may earn qualification spots: by team or by an individual. For each gender, an NOC that earns a team qualification spot may send three archers to compete in that team event; each archer also competes in the individual competition. NOCs that earn individual qualification spots are limited to a single entry in the individual event.

For each gender, there are 12 team qualification spots: the host nation, the top 8 teams at the World Archery Championships, and the top 3 teams at the Final World Team Qualification Tournament.

In addition to the 36 entries awarded through team qualification, an additional 28 individual qualification spots are available for each gender, bringing the total number of competitors in each individual event to 64.

Qualification for the mixed team event is done through the ranking round at the Olympics.

=== 2012 ===
For 2012, the qualification rules were adjusted slightly. The host nation continued to receive three spots, as did the top eight teams at the World Championship. However, only 8 further individuals qualified through the individual placement at the World Championship. The continental tournaments received unbalanced allocations, with Africa and Oceania receiving only two qualification spots to the other continents' three. The Tripartite Commission retained its three selections. The remaining 13 spots were decided by Final Qualification Tournaments. Three additional team spots (9 individual spots) were allocated through the Final Qualification team event, and the last 4 spots through the Final Qualification individual tournament. If any of the NOCs qualifying through Final Qualification had already earned an individual spot, one more spot as added to the individual Final Qualification quota.

=== 2016 ===
Africa received 3 qualification spots in the continental tournaments, leaving Oceania as the only continent to receive 2 spots rather than 3.

=== 2020 ===
For the 2020 Olympics (which was postponed to 2021 due to the COVID-19 pandemic), the five Continental Games were added to the qualification pathway. The winning NOC in the mixed team event at each of the five receives one allocation spot per gender; there is also one quota spot per gender for the individual event winners at the Asian, European, and Pan American Games. The World Championship allocation was reduced to 4 per gender and the Tripartite Commission allocation was reduced to 2 per gender. The European continental tournament received an additional spot (up to 4) at the expense of Oceania (down to 1) and Africa (down to 2). The base allocation for the final individual qualification tournament was reduced to only 1 per gender, though this tournament also reallocates unused quota spots.

== Competition ==
From 1988 through 2016, Olympic archery consisted of four medal events: men's individual, women's individual, men's team, and women's team. The mixed team event was added in 2020. In all five events, the distance from the archer to the target is 70 meters.

=== Individual ===
In the individual competitions, 64 archers compete. The competition begins with the ranking round. Each archer shoots 72 arrows (in six ends, or groups, of 12 arrows). They are then ranked by score to determine their seeding for the single-elimination bracket. After this, final rankings for each archer are determined by the archer's score in the round in which the archer was defeated, with the archers defeated in the first round being ranked 33rd through 64th.

==== Pre-2008 ====
The first elimination round pits the first ranked archer against the sixty-fourth, the second against the sixty-third, and so on. In this match as well as the second and third, the archers shoot simultaneously 18 arrows in ends of 3 arrows. The archer with the higher score after 18 arrows moves on to the next round while the loser is eliminated.

After three such rounds, there are 8 archers remaining. The remaining three rounds (quarterfinals, semifinals, and medal matches) are referred to as the finals rounds. They consist of each archer shooting 12 arrows, again in ends of 3 arrows. The two archers in the match alternate by arrow instead of shooting their arrows simultaneously as in the first three rounds. The losers of the quarterfinals are eliminated, while the losers of the semifinals play each other to determine the bronze medal and fourth place. The two archers who are undefeated through the semifinals face each other in the gold medal match, in which the winner takes the gold medal while the loser receives the silver medal.

==== 2008 changes ====
All matches in 2008 were in the previous finals round format, using 12 arrow matches. Archers alternated shooting by arrow.

==== 2012 changes ====
The individual match system was completely overhauled for the 2012 Olympics, though the single elimination with bronze medal match format was retained. The matches now consisted of sets. Each set comprised both archers shooting three arrows. The archer with the best score in the set received two points; if the set was drawn, each archer received one point. The match would continue until one archer reached six points. If the match was tied after five sets, a single arrow shoot-off was held with the closest arrow to center winning.

=== Team ===
The team event uses the results of the same ranking round as the individual competition to determine seeding for the teams. The team's three individual archers' scores are summed to get a team ranking round score. The competition thereafter is a single-elimination bracket, with the top 4 teams receiving a bye into the quarterfinals. The semifinal losers face each other in the bronze medal match. The set format from the individual competition was not used in 2012, but was used beginning in 2016. In team matches prior to 2016, each archer shot 8 arrows, with the best overall team score (for the total of 24 arrows) winning the match. Beginning with 2016, the set format (with each archer shooting two arrows per set for a total of six arrows per team per set) is used. The teams score 2 set points for every match won, if a tie occurs both teams will be given 1 point each. the first team to reach 5 set points wins.

=== Mixed team ===
The mixed team competition uses the results of the ranking round to both qualify and seed teams. Each of the 16 teams that compete consist of one man and one woman.

== Events ==
=== Early Games ===
Early Olympic archery competitions had events that were unique for each of the Games.

| 1900 | 1904 | 1908 | 1912 | 1920 |
|---|---|---|---|---|
| 7 events, men only | 6 events, men and women | 3 events, men and women | not held | 10 events, men only |
| Au Cordon Doré, 50 metres; Au Cordon Doré, 33 metres; Au Chapelet, 50 metres; Au Chapelet, 33 metres; Sur la Perche à la Herse; Sur la Perche à la Pyramide; Championnat du Monde | Team round, men; Team round, women; Double American round, men; Double Columbia round, women; Double National round, women; Double York round, men | Double National round, women; Double York round, men; Continental style, men | | Individual fixed large bird; Individual fixed small bird; Individual moving bird, 50 metres; Individual moving bird, 33 metres; Individual moving bird, 28 metres; Team fixed large bird; Team fixed small bird; Team moving bird, 50 metres; Team moving bird, 33 metres; Team moving bird, 28 metres |

=== Modern Games ===
Current program
| Event | 72 | 76 | 80 | 84 | 88 | 92 | 96 | 00 | 04 | 08 | 12 | 16 | 20 | 24 | 28 | Years |
| Men's individual | X | X | X | X | X | X | X | X | X | X | X | X | X | X | X | 15 |
| Men's team | – | – | – | – | X | X | X | X | X | X | X | X | X | X | X | 11 |
| Women's individual | X | X | X | X | X | X | X | X | X | X | X | X | X | X | X | 15 |
| Women's team | – | – | – | – | X | X | X | X | X | X | X | X | X | X | X | 11 |
| Team (recurve) | – | – | – | – | – | – | – | – | – | – | – | – | X | X | X | 3 |
| Team (compound) | – | – | – | – | – | – | – | – | – | – | – | – | – | – | X | 1 |
| Events | 2 | 2 | 2 | 2 | 4 | 4 | 4 | 4 | 4 | 4 | 4 | 4 | 5 | 5 | 6 | 56 |

== Participating nations ==
The following nations have taken part in the Archery competition.

| Event | 96 | 00 | 04 | 08 | 12 | 20 | 24 | 28 | 32 | 36 | 48 | 52 | 56 | 60 | 64 | 68 | 72 | 76 | 80 | 84 | 88 | 92 | 96 | 00 | 04 | 08 | 12 | 16 | 20 | 24 | Years |
|---|---|---|---|---|---|---|---|---|---|---|---|---|---|---|---|---|---|---|---|---|---|---|---|---|---|---|---|---|---|---|---|
| Argentina | | | | | | | | | | | | | | | | | | | | | | 2 | | | | | | | | 1 | 2 |
| Australia | | | | ANZ | | | | | | | | | | | | | 3 | 4 | 3 | 2 | 3 | 3 | 5 | 6 | 6 | 5 | 2 | 4 | 4 | 2 | 14 |
| Austria | | | | | | | | | | | | | | | | | | 1 | 1 | 1 | | | | | | | | 1 | | 1 | 5 |
| Azerbaijan | | | | | | | | | | | | | | | | | | | | | | 1 | | 1 | | | | | | | 2 |
| Bangladesh | | | | | | | | | | | | | | | | | | | | | | | 1 | 1 | 2 | 1 | | | | | 4 |
| Belarus | | | | | | | | | | | | | | | | | 2 | 2 | 2 | 2 | 1 | 1 | 2 | 2 | 2 | 2 | 1 | 1 | 3 | | 7 |
| Belgium | | 18 | | | | 14 | | | | | | | | | | | 3 | 2 | 2 | 5 | 3 | 1 | 1 | 1 | | | | 1 | 1 | | 12 |
| Bhutan | | | 6 | 3 | | 6 | | | | | | | | | | | 2 | 2 | 2 | 2 | 1 | 1 | 1 | 1 | | | | | | | 11 |
| Brazil | | | | | | | | | | | | | | | | | 2 | 1 | 2 | 2 | | | | 1 | 1 | 6 | 2 | 2 | | | 9 |
| Bulgaria | | | | | | | | | | | | | | | | | 2 | | 2 | | | 1 | 1 | | 1 | 1 | 1 | | | | 6 |
| Canada | | | | | | | | | | | | | | | | | 6 | 4 | | 3 | 4 | 3 | 3 | 1 | 2 | 4 | 2 | 2 | 2 | 2 | 13 |
| Central African Republic | | | | | | | | | | | | | | | | | | | | | | | | | | 1 | | | | | 1 |
| Chad | | | | | | | | | | | | | | | | | | | | | | | | | | | 1 | 1 | | | 2 |
| Chile | | | | | | | | | | | | | | | | | | | | | | | | | 1 | | 1 | 1 | 1 | 1 | 5 |
| China | | | | | | | | | | | | | | | | | 6 | 6 | 6 | 6 | 6 | 6 | 6 | 6 | 6 | 5 | 6 | 6 | 6 | 6 | 11 |
| Colombia | | | | | | | | | | | | | | | | | | | | 1 | | 1 | | | 3 | 2 | 4 | 2 | 4 | | 7 |
| Costa Rica | | | | | | | | | | | | | | | | | | 2 | 2 | | 1 | | | | | | | | | | 3 |
| Cuba | | | | | | | | | | | | | | | | | | | | | | | | 4 | 1 | 1 | 1 | 1 | 1 | 1 | 6 |
| Cyprus | | | | | | | | | | | | | | | | | | | | 1 | | | 1 | | | 1 | | | | | 2 |
| Czech Republic | | | | | | | | | | | | | | | | | | | | | | | | | 2 | | | 1 | 2 | | 3 |
| Czechoslovakia | | | | | | 3 | | | | | | | | | | | | | 1 | | | | | | | | | | | | 2 |
| Denmark | | | | | | | | | | | | | | | | | 4 | 1 | | | 3 | 3 | | 1 | 1 | 2 | 3 | 1 | 1 | 1 | 10 |
| Dominican Republic | | | | | | | | | | | | | | | | | | | | | | | | | | | | 1 | | | 1 |
| Ecuador | | | | | | | | | | | | | | | | | | | | | | | | | | | | | 1 | | 1 |
| Egypt | | | | | | | | | | | | | | | | | | | | | | 1 | 4 | 2 | 2 | 2 | 2 | 2 | | | 7 |
| El Salvador | | | | | | | | | | | | | | | | | | | | | 1 | 1 | | | 1 | | | | | | 3 |
| Estonia | | | | | | | | | | | | | | | | | | | | | | 1 | 1 | 1 | 1 | 1 | 1 | | | | 6 |
| Fiji | | | | | | | | | | | | | | | | | | | | | | | | 1 | | | 1 | 1 | | | 3 |
| Finland | | | | | | 3 | | | | | | | | | | | 2 | 4 | 5 | 6 | 3 | 3 | 3 | 3 | 1 | 1 | 2 | 1 | 1 | | 13 |
| France | | 129 | | 15 | | 8 | | | | | | | | | | | 5 | 2 | | 2 | 6 | 6 | 4 | 5 | 6 | 5 | 4 | 3 | 4 | 6 | 15 |
| Georgia | | | | | | | | | | | | | | | | | | | | | | 1 | 3 | 2 | 2 | 1 | 3 | | | | 6 |
| Germany | | | | | | | | | | | | | | | | | 6 | 3 | 4 | 4 | 2 | 2 | 2 | 4 | 4 | | | | | | 9 |
| West Germany | | | | | | | | | | | | | | | | | 4 | 3 | | 5 | 6 | | | | | | | | | | 4 |
| Great Britain | | | | 41 | | | | | | | | | | | | | 6 | 4 | 4 | 6 | 6 | 6 | 3 | 3 | 4 | 6 | 6 | 2 | 6 | 6 | 15 |
| Greece | | | | | | | | | | | | | | | | | | | | | | | | 1 | 6 | 2 | 1 | 1 | | | 5 |
| Guam | | | | | | | | | | | | | | | | | | | | | | | | 1 | | | | | | | 1 |
| Guinea | | | | | | | | | | | | | | | | | | | | | | | | | 1 | | | | | | 1 |
| Hong Kong | | | | | | | | | | | | | | | | | 6 | 3 | 1 | | 6 | 3 | | | | | 1 | | 1 | | 4 |
| Hungary | | | | | | | | | | | | | | | | | 2 | | 4 | | | 3 | 2 | | | | | | | | 4 |
| India | | | | | | | | | | | | | | | | | | | | 3 | 3 | 2 | 3 | 2 | 6 | 4 | 6 | 4 | 4 | | 9 |
| Indonesia | | | | | | | | | | | | | | | | | 1 | 2 | 4 | 3 | 1 | 2 | 4 | 3 | 1 | 2 | 2 | 1 | 4 | 4 | 13 |
| Iran | | | | | | | | | | | | | | | | | | | | | | 2 | 2 | 1 | 1 | 1 | | | | | 5 |
| Iraq | | | | | | | | | | | | | | | | | | | | | | | | | | | 1 | | | | 1 |
| Ireland | | | | | | | | | | | | | | | | | 1 | 3 | 2 | 3 | 1 | 1 | | | | | | | | | 6 |
| Israel | | | | | | | | | | | | | | | | | | | | | | | | | | | 1 | 2 | 2 | | 2 |
| Italy | | | | | | | | | | | | | | | | | 3 | 4 | 3 | 3 | 3 | 4 | 6 | 6 | 4 | 6 | 6 | 6 | 4 | 4 | 14 |
| Ivory Coast | | | | | | | | | | | | | | | | | | | | | | | | 1 | 1 | | | | | | 2 |
| Japan | | | 4 | 4 | | | | | | | | | | | | | 4 | 4 | | 5 | 6 | 6 | 5 | 5 | 6 | 5 | 6 | 4 | 4 | 6 | 13 |
| Jordan | | | | | | | | | | | | | | | | | | | | | | 1 | | | | | | | | | 1 |
| Kazakhstan | | | | | | | | | | | | | | | | | | | | | | 6 | 4 | 3 | 1 | 2 | 2 | 3 | 3 | | 8 |
| Kenya | | | | | | | | | | | | | | | | | | | 2 | 1 | | | | 1 | | | | | | | 3 |
| Laos | | | | | | | | | | | | | | | | | | | | 1 | | | | | | | | 1 | | | 1 |
| Libya | | | | | | | | | | | | | | | | | | | | | | | | | | | | 1 | | | 1 |
| Luxembourg | | | | 2 | | | | | | | | | | | | | 2 | 1 | 3 | 1 | 1 | | | | 1 | | 1 | 1 | | | 9 |
| Malawi | | | | | | | | | | | | | | | | | | | | | | | | | 1 | 1 | | | | | 2 |
| Malaysia | | | | | | | | | | | | | | | | | | | | | | 1 | 3 | 4 | 3 | 2 | 3 | | 6 | | 6 |
| Malta | | | | | | | | | | | | | | | | | 2 | 1 | 2 | | | | | | | | | | | | 3 |
| Mauritius | | | | | | | | | | | | | | | | | | | | | | | | 1 | 1 | 1 | | | | | 3 |
| Mexico | | | | 6 | | | | | | | | | | | | | 6 | 2 | 4 | 4 | 3 | 2 | 3 | 2 | 3 | 4 | 6 | 4 | 4 | 6 | 12 |
| Moldova | | | | | | | | | | | | | | | | | | | | | | 1 | 1 | | | 1 | 1 | 1 | 2 | | 5 |
| Monaco | | | | | | | | | | | | | | | | | | | | 1 | 1 | | | | | | | | | | 2 |
| Mongolia | | | | | | | | | | | | | | | | | 3 | 4 | 4 | | 3 | 1 | 1 | 2 | 1 | 2 | 1 | | | | 10 |
| Morocco | | | | | | | | | | | | | | | | | | | | | | | | | | | 1 | | | | 1 |
| Myanmar | | | | | | | | | | | | | | | | | | | | | | | 1 | 1 | 1 | 1 | 1 | | | | 5 |
| Nepal | | | | | | | | | | | | | | | | | | | | | | | | | | | | 1 | | 1 | 2 |
| Netherlands | | 6 | | | | 8 | | | | | | | | | | | | | 2 | 2 | 3 | 6 | 2 | 3 | 3 | | 1 | 3 | 4 | 4 | 13 |
| New Zealand | | | | | | 1 | | | | | | | | | | | | | 3 | 1 | 1 | 1 | 2 | 1 | | | | | | | 7 |
| North Korea | | | | | | | | | | | | | | | | | | 2 | 3 | | | 3 | | 1 | | 2 | 1 | 1 | | | 7 |
| Norway | | | | | | | | | | | | | | | | | 4 | 1 | | 1 | | 1 | 1 | 4 | | | 1 | 1 | | | 8 |
| Philippines | | | | | | | | | | | | | | | | | | 3 | | 2 | 1 | 1 | 1 | 2 | 1 | 1 | 2 | | 6 | | 6 |
| Poland | | | | | | | | | | | | | | | | | | 4 | 4 | 3 | | 3 | 6 | 4 | 5 | 4 | 6 | 2 | 1 | 2 | 13 |
| Portugal | | | | | | | | | | | | | | | | | | 1 | 3 | 1 | 1 | 1 | 1 | 1 | 1 | | 1 | | | | 6 |
| Puerto Rico | | | | | | | | | | | | | | | | | 1 | 2 | | 1 | 2 | | 1 | | | | 1 | | | 1 | 6 |
| Qatar | | | | | | | | | | | | | | | | | | | | 1 | | | | | | | 1 | | | | 1 |
| Romania | | | | | | | | | | | | | | | | | | | 4 | | | | | 1 | | | 2 | 1 | | | 4 |
| Russia | | | | | | | | | | | | | | | | | | | | | | | 6 | 4 | 5 | 5 | 3 | 3 | | | 6 |
| Republic of China | | | | | | | | | | | | | | | | | | | | | | | | | | | | | 4 | | 1 |
| Samoa | | | | | | | | | | | | | | | | | | | | 1 | 1 | | | | | | 1 | 1 | | | 2 |
| San Marino | | | | | | | | | | | | | | | | | | | | | | | 1 | 1 | | | 1 | 1 | | 1 | 4 |
| Saudi Arabia | | | | | | | | | | | | | | | | | | | | | 3 | 2 | | | | | | | 2 | | 2 |
| Slovakia | | | | | | | | | | | | | | | | | | | | | | | | | | 2 | 1 | 1 | | | 3 |
| Slovenia | | | | | | | | | | | | | | | | | | | | | | 1 | 3 | 1 | | 1 | 1 | 2 | | | 6 |
| Solomon Islands | | | | | | | | | | | | | | | | | | | | | 1 | | | | | | | | | | 1 |
| South Africa | | | | | | | | | | | | | | | | | 2 | 3 | 2 | 1 | 1 | 1 | 1 | | | 1 | | | | | 7 |
| South Korea | | | | | | | | | | | | | | | | | 3 | | | 6 | 6 | 6 | 6 | 6 | 6 | 6 | 6 | 6 | 6 | 6 | 12 |
| Soviet Union | | | | | | | | | | | | | | | | | 6 | 3 | 4 | 6 | 6 | | | | | | | | | | 4 |
| Unified Team | | | | | | | | | | | | | | | | | | | | | | 6 | | | | | | | | | 1 |
| Spain | | | | | | 2 | | | | | | | | | | | 2 | 2 | 4 | 4 | 4 | 4 | 1 | 1 | 2 | 1 | 2 | 4 | 2 | 2 | 13 |
| Sweden | | | | | | | | | | | | | | | | | 5 | 4 | 3 | 5 | 6 | 3 | 6 | 6 | 3 | 1 | 1 | 1 | 1 | | 13 |
| Switzerland | | | | | | | | | | | | | | | | | 4 | | 4 | 3 | 2 | | | | | 1 | 2 | | | | 6 |
| Chinese Taipei | | | | | | | | | | | | | | | | | 1 | | | 2 | 6 | 3 | 6 | 3 | 6 | 6 | 6 | 6 | 6 | 6 | 12 |
| Tajikistan | | | | | | | | | | | | | | | | | | | | | | | | 1 | 1 | | | | | | 2 |
| Thailand | | | | | | | | | | | | | | | | | | 3 | | 2 | | | | | | | 1 | 1 | | | 4 |
| Tonga | | | | | | | | | | | | | | | | | | | | | 1 | 2 | | | | 2 | | | | | 2 |
| Tunisia | | | | | | | | | | | | | | | | | | | | | | | | | | | 2 | 1 | 2 | 1 | 2 |
| Turkey | | | | | | | | | | | | | | | | | | | | 2 | 6 | 4 | 6 | 4 | 2 | 1 | 2 | 2 | 4 | | 11 |
| Uganda | | | | | | | | | | | | | | | | | | | | | | | | 1 | | | | | 1 | | 1 |
| Ukraine | | | | | | | | | | | | | | | | | | | | | | 6 | 6 | 6 | 5 | 6 | 4 | 3 | | | 8 |
| United States | | | 29 | 1 | | | | | | | | | | | | | 6 | 4 | | 6 | 6 | 5 | 6 | 6 | 6 | 5 | 6 | 4 | 6 | 4 | 15 |
| Uzbekistan | | | | | | | | | | | | | | | | | | | | | | | | 1 | 1 | | | | | | 1 |
| Vanuatu | | | | | | | | | | | | | | | | | | | | | | | | | 1 | | | | | | 1 |
| Venezuela | | | | | | | | | | | | | | | | | | | | | | | | | 1 | | 2 | 2 | | | 3 |
| Vietnam | | | | | | | | | | | | | | | | | | | | | | | | | | 2 | 1 | 2 | | | 2 |
| Virgin Islands | | | | | | | | | | | | | | | | | | | | | | | | | | | 1 | 1 | | | 2 |
| Yugoslavia | | | | | | | | | | | | | | | | | 1 | 1 | | | | | | | | | | | | | 2 |
| Zimbabwe | | | 1 | | | 4 | | | | | | | | | | | | | | | 1 | | 1 | | | | 3 | | | | 3 |
| Year | 96 | 00 | 04 | 08 | 12 | 20 | 24 | 28 | 32 | 36 | 48 | 52 | 56 | 60 | 64 | 68 | 72 | 76 | 80 | 84 | 88 | 92 | 96 | 00 | 04 | 08 | 12 | 16 | 20 | 24 | Years |

Notes:
^{a}: Due to the Russian doping scandal, the Russian Federation was not permitted to send athletes to the 2020 Summer Olympics; athletes instead competed under the acronym "ROC", after the name of the Russian Olympic Committee.
^{b}: Due to Russia's 2022 invasion of Ukraine in violation of the Olympic Truce, the Russian Federation and Belarus were banned from sending athletes to the 2024 Summer Olympics. Russian and Belarusian athletes were permitted to participate under the designation of Individual Neutral Athletes, none of whom competed in archery.

== Records ==
The Olympic records for archery are for the competition format established in 1992.

=== Men's current records ===
| # of arrows | Archer(s) | Score | Games |
|---|---|---|---|
| 72 (ranking) | Kim Woo-jin (KOR) | 700 | 2016 |
| 216 (team ranking) | South Korea; Im Dong-hyun; Kim Bub-min; Oh Jin-hyek | 2087 | 2012 |

=== Women's current records ===
| # of arrows | Archer(s) | Score | Games |
|---|---|---|---|
| 72 (ranking) | Lim Si-hyeon (KOR) | 694 | 2024 |
| 216 (team ranking) | South Korea; Jang Min-hee; Kang Chae-young; An San | 2032 | 2020 |

=== Mixed team current record ===
| # of arrows | Archer(s) | Score | Games |
|---|---|---|---|
| 144 (ranking) | South Korea; Kim Woo-jin; Lim Si-hyeon | 1380 | 2024 |

== See also ==
- List of Olympic medalists in archery
- List of Olympic venues in archery
- Archery at the Summer Paralympics
- Archery at the Youth Olympic Games
- Field archery at the World Games
