= Victor Sonnemans =

Belgian water polo player

Personal information
- Born: October 25, 1874 Brussels, Belgium
- Died: October 3, 1962 (aged 87) Schaerbeek, Belgium

Sport
- Sport: Water polo
Medal record
Representing Belgium
Olympic Games
Silver medal – second place	1900 Paris	Team competition

Victor Jean Marie Sonnemans (25 October 1874 – 3 October 1962) was a Belgian water polo player and won silver medal at the 1900 Summer Olympics.

== See also ==
- List of Olympic medalists in water polo (men)
