= Popinjay (sport) =

Shooting at wooden birds on a high pole

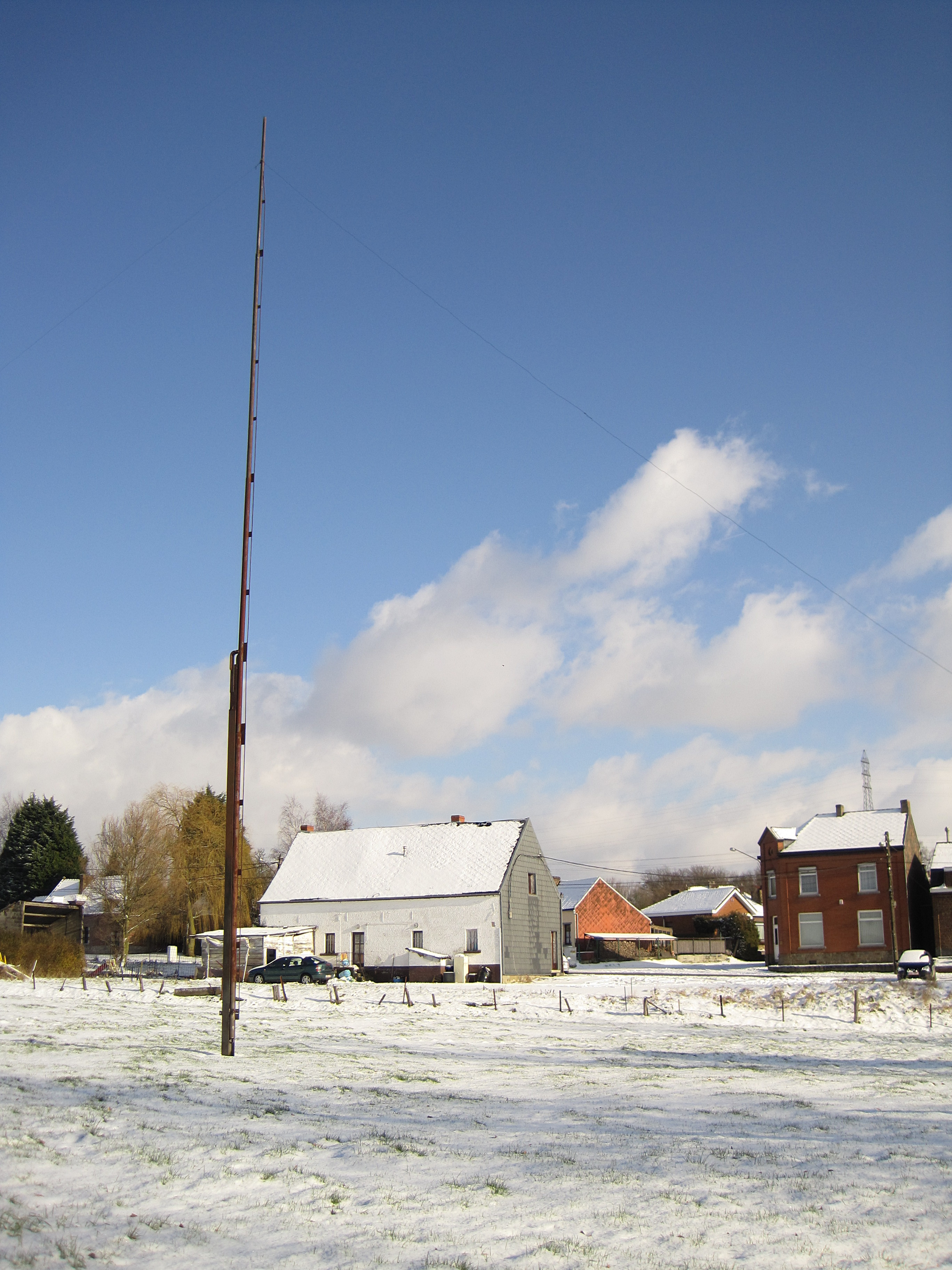
Popinjay mast for archery in Havré Belgium

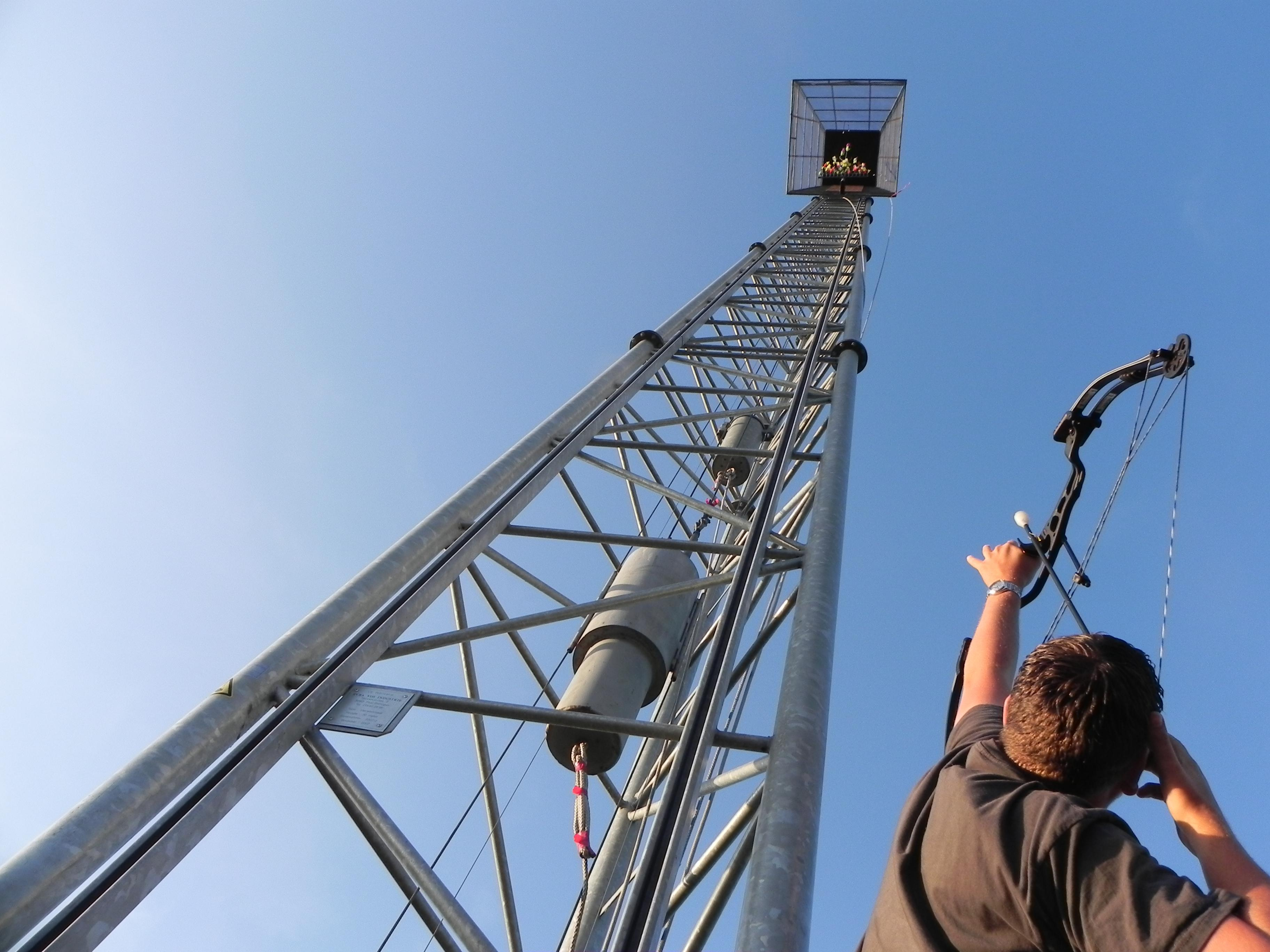
Popinjay mast for archery in Flanders Belgium

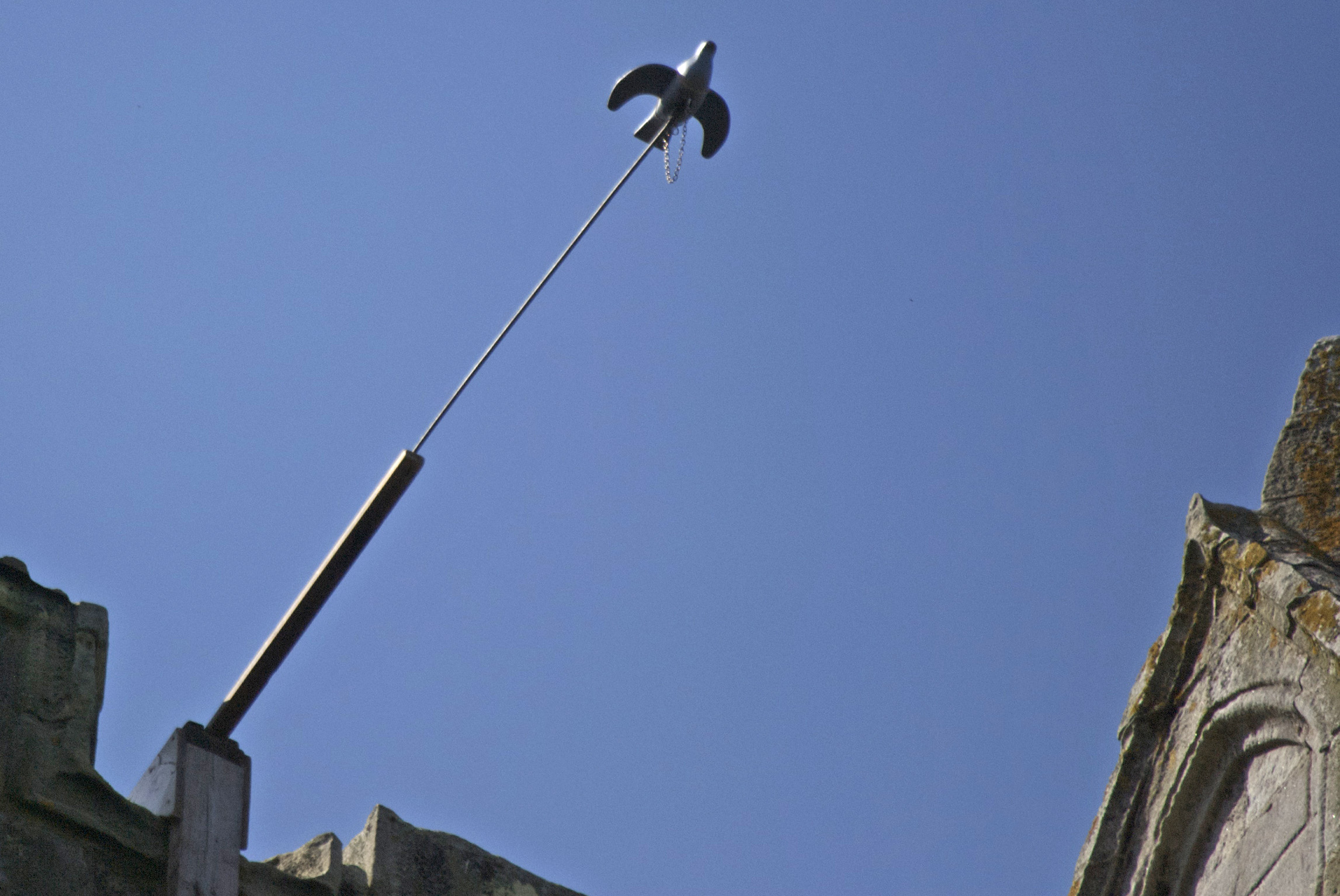
Papingo target on pole at the top of Kilwinning Abbey tower

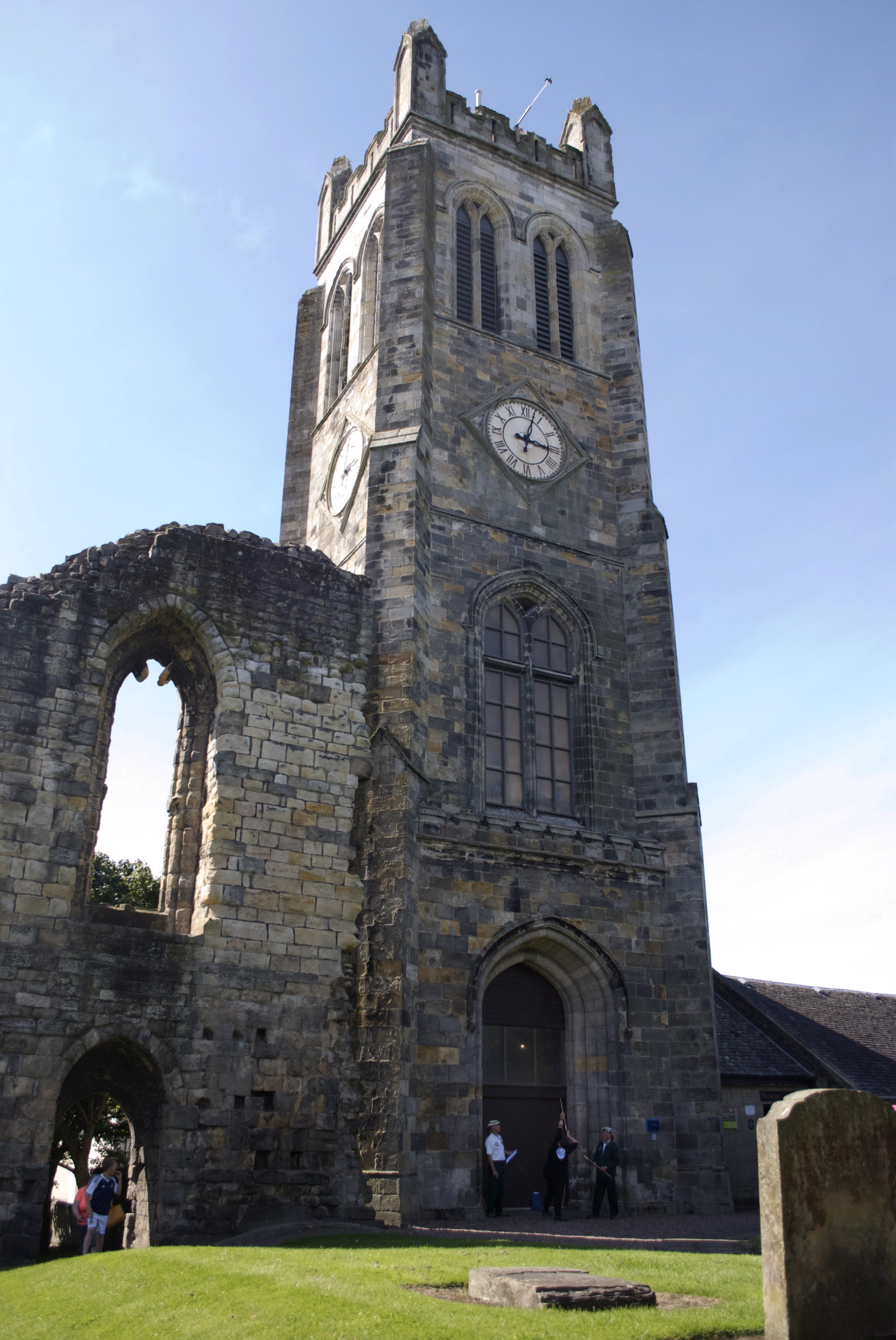
Open papingo shoot held by the Ancient Society of Kilwinning Archers at Kilwinning Abbey in Ayrshire in Scotland

Popinjay or papingo (an old word for parrot, designating a painted bird), also called pole archery, is a shooting sport that can be performed with either rifles or archery equipment. The object of popinjay is to knock artificial birds off their perches. The rifle form is a popular diversion in Denmark; a Scottish variant is also known. The archery form, called staande wip in Dutch language and papegai (i.e. parrot) in French, is popular in Belgium, and in Canada among descendants of 20th-century Belgian emigrants; it is shot occasionally in the United Kingdom under the governance of the Grand National Archery Society. In Germany a traditional shooting at wooden birds placed on a high pole is called "Vogelschießen" (that is "bird shooting"). These are carried out either with small bore rifles or crossbows.

== Archery ==
The archery form of popinjay dates back to at least the fifteenth century. The annual papingo (popinjay) tournament of the Ancient Society of Kilwinning Archers, of Ayrshire in Scotland, takes place at Kilwinning Abbey, with the papingo target on the end of a pole projecting from the top of the tower. The event is believed to have been running since 1488, though the earliest records are attested in a minute of the society dated September 1688. In a tradition dating back to 1488 when the Benn was a multicoloured length of Persian taffeta three quarters of an ell broad and 3 ells long, the winner is awarded the Captain's Benn, a scarlet ribbon worn over the shoulder and across the chest, and buys a round of drinks. The prize of a silver arrow was introduced in 1724, and following that became a perpetual trophy, with a medallion attached each year by the winner commemorating his name and date of victory. It is officially known as the "Papingo Arrow".

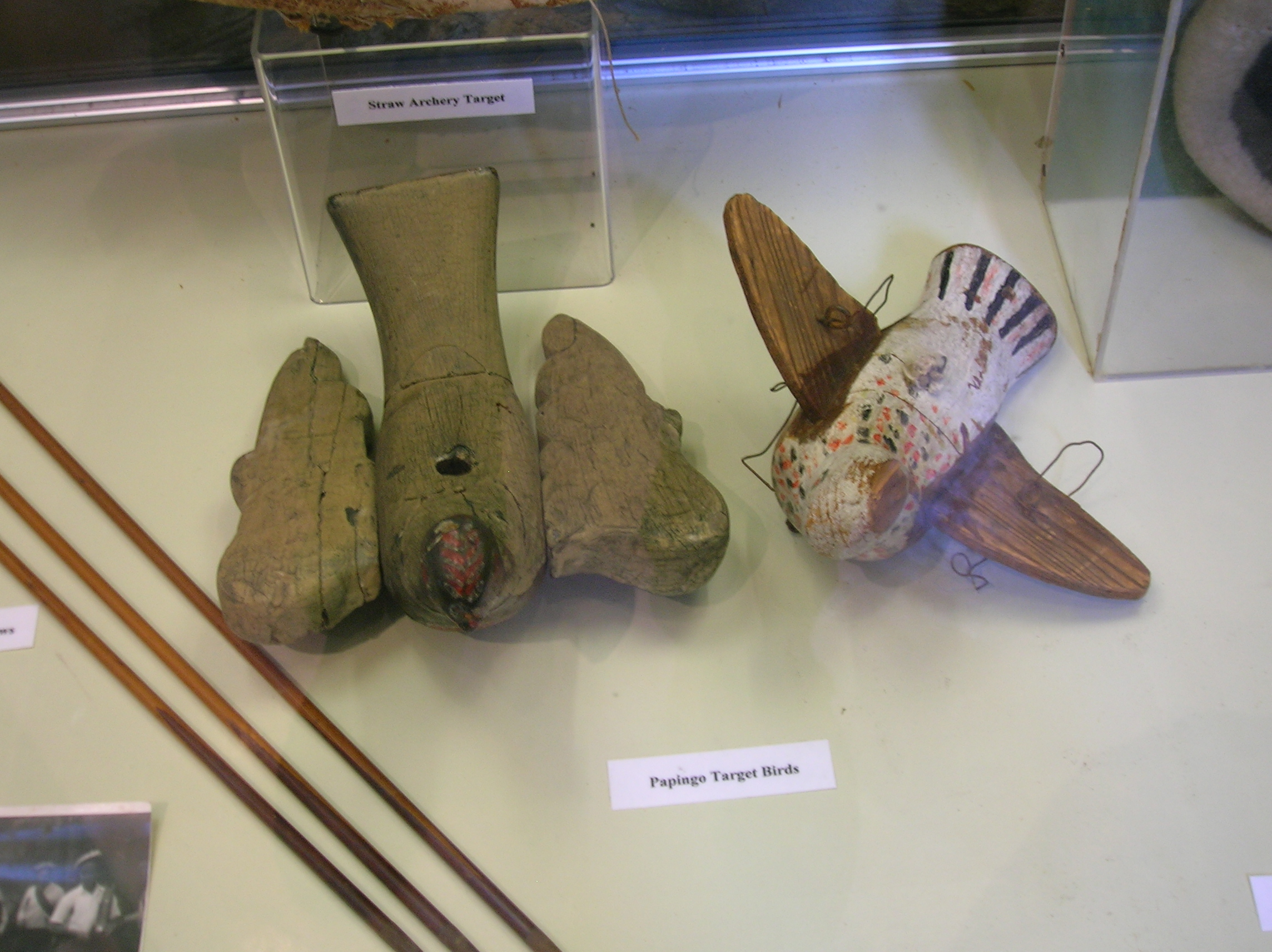
Historic papingos in the Kilwinning Abbey tower museum, Scotland.

Popinjay archery is popular in Belgium, but is less common elsewhere. Many Belgian clubs have permanently erected popinjay masts. Popinjay can also be shot horizontally rather than vertically, though this form is even less common.

There are no international standard rules of popinjay. The definition of rules is left to national archery organisations.

=== Vertical ===
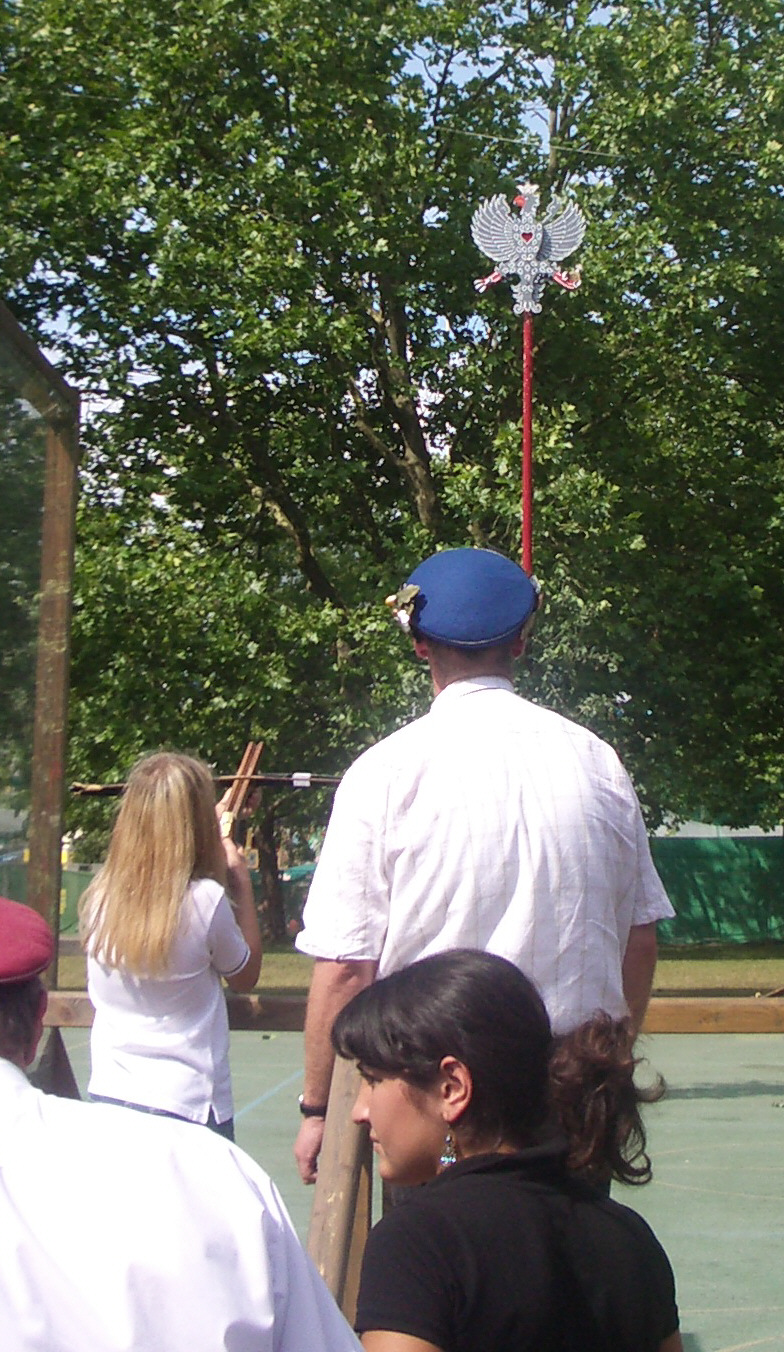
Traditional shooting at a wooden eagle with a crossbow at the "Rutenfest Ravensburg", Germany

The format and rules of popinjay given below are drawn from those defined for the United Kingdom by the Grand National Archery Society. The specific rules are given in the GNAS Rules of Shooting 2006, rules 1000 to 1006. (GNAS, 2006)

The object of popinjay is to knock artificial birds off their perches. The perches are cross-pieces on top of a 90-foot (27 m) mast. The "cock" (the largest bird) is set on the top cross piece. Four smaller "hens" are set on the next crosspiece down. Two dozen or so "chicks" (the smallest birds) are set on the lower cross pieces. (GNAS, 2006 - rule 1000)

The archer stands near the base of the mast and shoots arrows upwards at the birds. (GNAS, 2006 - rule 1000) The arrows are tipped with rubber blunts rather than sharp points. The blunts are between 0.75 inches (19 mm) and 1-inch (25 mm) in diameter. (GNAS, 2006 - rule 1001)

Points are scored for each bird knocked off. Typically, the archer scores 5 points for the cock, 3 points for a hen and 1 point for a chick. (GNAS, 2006 - rule 1004)

In Manitoba, Canada, the sport is called Pole Archery. There are currently 3 clubs shooting Vertical. Two clubs are based in Winnipeg, Manitoba. They are St. Sebastian's Pole Archery Club, formed in 1923 and Robin Hood Pole Archery Club, formed in 1929. The 3rd club is based in Richer, Manitoba and is called The Merry Men. The point scoring is slightly different for the Canadian Pole archery clubs. There are 5 rows of "Birds" plus the very tip. For the 1st 3 rows up from bottom, the Birds are just called "Singles" & are worth 1 point each. The 4th row has 4 birds called "Kullas" & they are worth 2 points each. The 5th row has 2 birds called "Sides" & they are worth 3 points each. On the very tip of the shooting fork is mounted the "King" bird & it is worth 4 points (it is called the "Queen" bird on the horizontal fork, see next section). At the 1st meet of every year, the 1st person to shoot off the King bird is known for that season as the "King Shooter" and has the right to shoot 1st at all subsequent meets. Meets usually last 1 hour with the winner being that archer who has accumulated the most points.

=== Horizontal ===
In Ontario, Canada and Michigan, United States, there are popinjay archery clubs that shoot horizontally at the angled indoor "perch" (or "rack") from a distance of 65 feet (19.8 m). This horizontal variation of popinjay originates from Flanders, and is called liggende wip. The perch consists of a "high bird" worth 4 points, two "side birds" worth 3 points, two "kalle birds" worth 2 points, and 30 "little/small birds" worth one point. The "birds" consist of "blocks" (often made of plastic) for a base, with a hole in it to slide onto the pin of the perch, and feathers attached to the block by a small wire. The objective of the sport is to shoot an arrow with a plastic or rubber blunt tip also known as a "block" (not to be confused with the base of the birds) and knock off one of the birds on the perch without the use of a sight. At the end of the season, trophies are awarded to members who have received the most points in their division or category.

In Manitoba, Canada, there are two clubs shooting horizontal or the "Laydown Fork" as it is known locally. One club, St. Sebastianette Archery Club (ladies) is based in Winnipeg, Manitoba, and the other club, Artemis Archers based in Richer, Manitoba. a 3rd club, the Ste Rose Ladies Club, based in Ste. Rose du Lac, Manitoba just recently disbanded. The two clubs get together for an interclub shoot the 2nd weekend of September. Points on the Horizontal fork are the same as the Vertical fork (see above) although the very top bird is called the "Queen" instead of the "King".

There are also several clubs in Southern Ontario. Towns such as Aylmer, Bothwell, Chatham, Wallaceburg, Delhi and Waterford. Each spring they have 3 tournaments. The first is called the tri-county, which consists of 3 clubs within the region's counties - Aylmer, Delhi and Waterford all compete in one while Wallaceburg, Chatham and Bothwell compete in another. This usually takes place during the first week of March. The second tournament takes place during the first week of April and all clubs attend. This tournament usually has an "open shoot" on the Friday night prior to the actual tournament. Prizes and cash are paid out for shooting off birds. This is basically a "practice" round before the big day. Two perches are placed side by side for the competition. The Saturday is the actual tournament. There are usually 20–25 teams in attendance. Teams draw for shooting order and the game begins at 11:00 AM. Each team consists of 6 shooters. The names are on the list in order and each shooter gets 10 shots, one at a time per round. The teams shoot until all rounds are completed, and the highest team score at the end of the day wins the trophy for their club. That club gets to host the tournament the following year. There is also a ladies trophy for the winning ladies team. Finally there is the International tournament in which all Canadian teams participate as well as teams from the Detroit area in Michigan. The same format is followed as the National with an open shoot on Friday night and the tournament on Saturday. Usually 23–27 teams are present at this shoot.

=== Festival of Popinjay ===
The Festival of Popinjay is an old British tradition held on the first Sunday in May. On this day, a figure of a popinjay (a parrot or other brightly marked bird) clothed in coloured feathers is suspended from a pole and used as a shooting target. The man whose ball or arrow severs the string being used to suspend the bird can claim the title "Captain Popinjay" for the rest of the day.

== Muskets and rifles ==
Walter Scott's Old Mortality depicts a papingo shoot using muskets, set at a wapenshaw held in 1679.

In the Rifle form, members of Popinjay Clubs—likely from the upper classes—would gather in a field in front of spectators; the festivities were sometimes marked by musical bands and other entertainment.

== See also ==
- Old Thomas, a weathervane in Tallinn
