= Archery at the 1900 Summer Olympics =

Archery at the Games of the II Olympiad
- Venue: Bois de Vincennes
- Dates: 15 July – 14 August 1900
- No. of events: 7 (7 men, 0 women)
- Competitors: 153 from 3 nations

At the 1900 Summer Olympics, seven of the archery events that took place in Paris, France, are considered to be "Olympic" by Olympic historians, with 153 archers competing. The identities of 17 of those archers are known, though a number of those are known only by their surnames.

In total, 1400 archers to over 1500 archers participated in the archery competitions. It was the first time that archery was featured in the Olympics. All seven events were for men. Only France, Belgium, and the Netherlands sent archers. Six Dutch archers competed, but none qualified for any of the individual event finals.

Until July 2021, the IOC did not decide which events were "Olympic" and which were not.

== Events ==
The events included here exclude many of the archery events held in France in 1900 connected to the World's Fair; those events, if included, would put the number of archers over 5,000. These events are excluded typically because of their status as French national championships rather than international contests (even though international participants were invited to enter) or because, as team events, they were essentially qualifiers for the final events.

The team events au berceau served as qualifying for the individual events. The top eight finishers in the team events au cordon doré were eligible to compete for the individual titles, while the top six finishers in the team events au chapelet were eligible to compete for the individual titles. Two immensely popular types of archery – short-range butt shooting in a covered gallery (au berceau) and popinjay (sur la perche) – were practiced mainly in France and Belgium.

A case could also be made that only one event took place au berceau, that of the Championnat du Monde: this event was contested between the two best performing au berceau archers in the individual events, au cordon doré and au chapelet, being Henri Hérouin and Hubert Van Innis. Thus, all the earlier events could be considered qualifying for that one final event.

Crossbow shooting events also took place, though these are not considered to be Olympic.

== Medal table ==
Rank	Nation	Gold	Silver	Bronze	Total
1	France	4	5	4	13
2	Belgium	3	3	1	7
Totals (2 entries)		7	8	5	20

== Medal summary ==
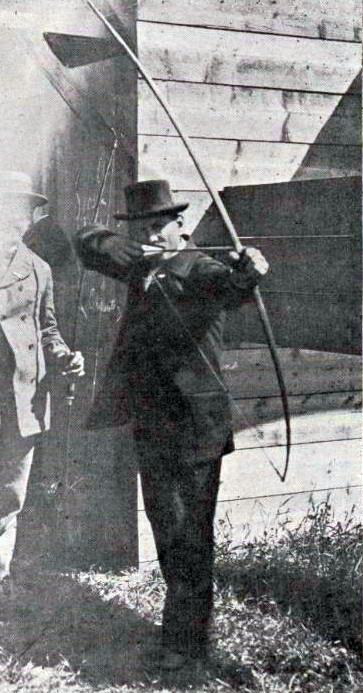
Unknown competitor in the archery events

Event	Gold	Silver	Bronze
Au Cordon Doré 33 metres	Hubert Van Innis; Belgium	Victor Thibaud; France	Charles Frédéric Petit; France
Au Cordon Doré 50 metres	Henri Hérouin; France	Hubert Van Innis; Belgium	Émile Fisseux; France
Au Chapelet 33 metres	Hubert Van Innis; Belgium	Victor Thibaud; France	Charles Frédéric Petit; France
Au Chapelet 50 metres	Eugène Mougin; France	Henri Helle; France	Émile Mercier; France
Championnat du Monde	Henri Hérouin; France	Hubert Van Innis; Belgium	Only two competitors
Sur la Perche à la Herse	Emmanuel Foulon; Belgium	Auguste Serrurier; France	Not awarded
Sur la Perche à la Herse	Emmanuel Foulon; Belgium	Emile Druart; Belgium	Not awarded
Sur la Perche à la Pyramide	Émile Grumiaux; France	Auguste Serrurier; France	Louis Glineur; Belgium

== Participating nations ==
A total of 153 archers from 3 nations competed at the Paris Games:

- Belgium (18)
- France (129)
- Netherlands (6)

== See also ==
- List of Olympic medalists in archery
