= List of Olympic medalists in archery =

This is the complete list of Olympic medalists in archery.

== Current program ==
Competition format:

- FITA round (now known as '1440 Round') (1972–1988)
- Olympic round (1992–)

=== Men's events ===
==== Individual ====
Games	Gold	Silver	Bronze
1972 Munich	John Williams; United States	Gunnar Jervill; Sweden	Kyösti Laasonen; Finland
1976 Montreal	Darrell Pace; United States	Hiroshi Michinaga; Japan	Giancarlo Ferrari; Italy
1980 Moscow	Tomi Poikolainen; Finland	Boris Isachenko; Soviet Union	Giancarlo Ferrari; Italy
1984 Los Angeles	Darrell Pace; United States	Richard McKinney; United States	Hiroshi Yamamoto; Japan
1988 Seoul	Jay Barrs; United States	Park Sung-soo; South Korea	Vladimir Yesheyev; Soviet Union
1992 Barcelona	Sébastien Flute; France	Chung Jae-hun; South Korea	Simon Terry; Great Britain
1996 Atlanta	Justin Huish; United States	Magnus Petersson; Sweden	Oh Kyo-moon; South Korea
2000 Sydney	Simon Fairweather; Australia	Vic Wunderle; United States	Wietse van Alten; Netherlands
2004 Athens	Marco Galiazzo; Italy	Hiroshi Yamamoto; Japan	Tim Cuddihy; Australia
2008 Beijing	Viktor Ruban; Ukraine	Park Kyung-mo; South Korea	Bair Badenov; Russia
2012 London	Oh Jin-hyek; South Korea	Takaharu Furukawa; Japan	Dai Xiaoxiang; China
2016 Rio de Janeiro	Ku Bon-chan; South Korea	Jean-Charles Valladont; France	Brady Ellison; United States
2020 Tokyo	Mete Gazoz; Turkey	Mauro Nespoli; Italy	Takaharu Furukawa; Japan
2024 Paris	Kim Woo-jin; South Korea	Brady Ellison; United States	Lee Woo-seok; South Korea
2028 Los Angeles			

==== Team ====
Games	Gold	Silver	Bronze
1988 Seoul	South Korea; Chun In-soo; Lee Han-sup; Park Sung-soo	United States; Jay Barrs; Richard McKinney; Darrell Pace	Great Britain; Steven Hallard; Richard Priestman; Leroy Watson
1992 Barcelona	Spain; Juan Carlos Holgado; Alfonso Menéndez; Antonio Vázquez	Finland; Ismo Falck; Jari Lipponen; Tomi Poikolainen	Great Britain; Steven Hallard; Richard Priestman; Simon Terry
1996 Atlanta	United States; Justin Huish; Butch Johnson; Rod White	South Korea; Jang Yong-ho; Kim Bo-ram; Oh Kyo-moon	Italy; Matteo Bisiani; Michele Frangilli; Andrea Parenti
2000 Sydney	South Korea; Jang Yong-ho; Kim Chung-tae; Oh Kyo-moon	Italy; Matteo Bisiani; Ilario Di Buò; Michele Frangilli	United States; Butch Johnson; Rod White; Vic Wunderle
2004 Athens	South Korea; Im Dong-hyun; Jang Yong-ho; Park Kyung-mo	Chinese Taipei; Chen Szu-yuan; Liu Ming-huang; Wang Cheng-pang	Ukraine; Dmytro Hrachov; Viktor Ruban; Oleksandr Serdyuk
2008 Beijing	South Korea; Im Dong-hyun; Lee Chang-hwan; Park Kyung-mo	Italy; Ilario Di Buò; Marco Galiazzo; Mauro Nespoli	China; Jiang Lin; Li Wenquan; Xue Haifeng
2012 London	Italy; Michele Frangilli; Marco Galiazzo; Mauro Nespoli	United States; Brady Ellison; Jake Kaminski; Jacob Wukie	South Korea; Im Dong-hyun; Kim Bub-min; Oh Jin-hyek
2016 Rio de Janeiro	South Korea; Kim Woo-jin; Ku Bon-chan; Lee Seung-yun	United States; Brady Ellison; Zach Garrett; Jake Kaminski	Australia; Alec Potts; Ryan Tyack; Taylor Worth
2020 Tokyo	South Korea; Kim Je-deok; Kim Woo-jin; Oh Jin-hyek	Chinese Taipei; Deng Yu-cheng; Tang Chih-chun; Wei Chun-heng	Japan; Takaharu Furukawa; Yuki Kawata; Hiroki Muto
2024 Paris	South Korea; Kim Je-deok; Kim Woo-jin; Lee Woo-seok	France; Baptiste Addis; Thomas Chirault; Jean-Charles Valladont	Turkey; Mete Gazoz; Ulaş Tümer; Muhammed Yıldırmış
2028 Los Angeles			

=== Women's events ===
==== Individual ====
Games	Gold	Silver	Bronze
1972 Munich	Doreen Wilber; United States	Irena Szydłowska; Poland	Emma Gapchenko; Soviet Union
1976 Montreal	Luann Ryon; United States	Valentyna Kovpan; Soviet Union	Zebiniso Rustamova; Soviet Union
1980 Moscow	Keto Losaberidze; Soviet Union	Natalya Butuzova; Soviet Union	Päivi Meriluoto; Finland
1984 Los Angeles	Seo Hyang-soon; South Korea	Li Lingjuan; China	Kim Jin-ho; South Korea
1988 Seoul	Kim Soo-nyung; South Korea	Wang Hee-kyung; South Korea	Yun Young-sook; South Korea
1992 Barcelona	Cho Youn-jeong; South Korea	Kim Soo-nyung; South Korea	Natalia Valeeva; Unified Team
1996 Atlanta	Kim Kyung-wook; South Korea	He Ying; China	Olena Sadovnycha; Ukraine
2000 Sydney	Yun Mi-jin; South Korea	Kim Nam-soon; South Korea	Kim Soo-nyung; South Korea
2004 Athens	Park Sung-hyun; South Korea	Lee Sung-jin; South Korea	Alison Williamson; Great Britain
2008 Beijing	Zhang Juanjuan; China	Park Sung-hyun; South Korea	Yun Ok-hee; South Korea
2012 London	Ki Bo-bae; South Korea	Aída Román; Mexico	Mariana Avitia; Mexico
2016 Rio de Janeiro	Chang Hye-jin; South Korea	Lisa Unruh; Germany	Ki Bo-bae; South Korea
2020 Tokyo	An San; South Korea	Elena Osipova; ROC	Lucilla Boari; Italy
2024 Paris	Lim Si-hyeon; South Korea	Nam Su-hyeon; South Korea	Lisa Barbelin; France
2028 Los Angeles			

==== Team ====
Games	Gold	Silver	Bronze
1988 Seoul	South Korea; Kim Soo-nyung; Wang Hee-kyung; Yun Young-sook	Indonesia; Lilies Handayani; Nurfitriyana Saiman; Kusuma Wardhani	United States; Deborah Ochs; Denise Parker; Melanie Skillman
1992 Barcelona	South Korea; Cho Youn-jeong; Kim Soo-nyung; Lee Eun-kyung	China; Ma Xiangjun; Wang Hong; Wang Xiaozhu	Unified Team; Lyudmila Arzhanikova; Khatuna Kvrivichvili; Natalia Valeeva
1996 Atlanta	South Korea; Kim Jo-sun; Kim Kyung-wook; Yoon Hye-young	Germany; Barbara Mensing; Cornelia Pfohl; Sandra Wagner-Sachse	Poland; Iwona Dzięcioł; Katarzyna Klata; Joanna Nowicka
2000 Sydney	South Korea; Kim Nam-soon; Kim Soo-nyung; Yun Mi-jin	Ukraine; Nataliya Burdeyna; Olena Sadovnycha; Kateryna Serdyuk	Germany; Barbara Mensing; Cornelia Pfohl; Sandra Wagner-Sachse
2004 Athens	South Korea; Lee Sung-jin; Park Sung-hyun; Yun Mi-jin	China; He Ying; Lin Sang; Zhang Juanjuan	Chinese Taipei; Chen Li-ju; Wu Hui-ju; Yuan Shu-chi
2008 Beijing	South Korea; Joo Hyun-jung; Park Sung-hyun; Yun Ok-hee	China; Chen Ling; Guo Dan; Zhang Juanjuan	France; Virginie Arnold; Sophie Dodemont; Bérengère Schuh
2012 London	South Korea; Choi Hyeon-ju; Ki Bo-bae; Lee Sung-jin	China; Cheng Ming; Fang Yuting; Xu Jing	Japan; Ren Hayakawa; Miki Kanie; Kaori Kawanaka
2016 Rio de Janeiro	South Korea; Chang Hye-jin; Choi Mi-sun; Ki Bo-bae	Russia; Tuyana Dashidorzhieva; Ksenia Perova; Inna Stepanova	Chinese Taipei; Lei Chien-ying; Lin Shih-chia; Tan Ya-ting
2020 Tokyo	South Korea; An San; Jang Min-hee; Kang Chae-young	ROC (ROC); Svetlana Gomboeva; Elena Osipova; Ksenia Perova	Germany; Michelle Kroppen; Charline Schwarz; Lisa Unruh
2024 Paris	South Korea; Jeon Hun-young; Lim Si-hyeon; Nam Su-hyeon	China; An Qixuan; Li Jiaman; Yang Xiaolei	Mexico; Ángela Ruiz; Alejandra Valencia; Ana Paula Vázquez
2028 Los Angeles			

=== Mixed events (recurve) ===
==== Team ====
Games	Gold	Silver	Bronze
2020 Tokyo	South Korea; Kim Je-deok; An San	Netherlands; Steve Wijler; Gabriela Schloesser	Mexico; Luis Álvarez; Alejandra Valencia
2024 Paris	South Korea; Kim Woo-jin; Lim Si-hyeon	Germany; Florian Unruh; Michelle Kroppen	United States; Brady Ellison; Casey Kaufhold
2028 Los Angeles			

=== Mixed events (compound) ===
==== Team ====
Games	Gold	Silver	Bronze
2028 Los Angeles			

== Discontinued events ==
Early Olympic archery competitions (1900–1920) included events unique for each Games.

=== 1900 Paris ===
Event	Gold	Silver	Bronze
Au cordon doré, 50 metres	Henri Hérouin; France	Hubert Van Innis; Belgium	Émile Fisseux; France
Au cordon doré, 33 metres	Hubert Van Innis; Belgium	Victor Thibaud; France	Charles Frédéric Petit; France
Au chapelet, 50 metres	Eugène Mougin; France	Henri Helle; France	Émile Mercier; France
Au chapelet, 33 metres	Hubert Van Innis; Belgium	Victor Thibaud; France	Charles Frédéric Petit; France
Championnat du Monde	Henri Hérouin; France	Hubert Van Innis; Belgium	None awarded
Sur la perche à la herse	Emmanuel Foulon; Belgium	Emile Druart; Belgium	None awarded
Sur la perche à la herse	Emmanuel Foulon; Belgium	Auguste Serrurier; France	None awarded
Sur la perche à la pyramide	Émile Grumiaux; France	Auguste Serrurier; France	Louis Glineur; Belgium

=== 1904 St. Louis ===
==== Men's events ====
Event	Gold	Silver	Bronze
Double American round	George Bryant; United States	Robert Williams; United States	William Thompson; United States
Double York round	George Bryant; United States	Robert Williams; United States	William Thompson; United States
Team round	United States; Potomac Archers; William Thompson; Robert Williams; Louis Maxson; Galen Spencer	United States; Cincinnati Archers; Charles Woodruff; William Clark; Charles Hubbard; Samuel Duvall	United States; Boston Archers; George Bryant; Wallace Bryant; Cyrus Edwin Dallin; Henry B. Richardson

==== Women's events ====
Event	Gold	Silver	Bronze
Double Columbia round	Matilda Howell; United States	Emma Cooke; United States	Jessie Pollock; United States
Double national round	Matilda Howell; United States	Emma Cooke; United States	Jessie Pollock; United States
Team round	United States; Matilda Howell; Jessie Pollock; Emily Woodruff; Leonie Taylor	None awarded	None awarded

=== 1908 London ===
==== Men's events ====
Event	Gold	Silver	Bronze
Continental style	Eugène Grisot; France	Louis Vernet; France	Gustave Cabaret; France
Double York round	William Dod; Great Britain	Reginald Brooks-King; Great Britain	Henry B. Richardson; United States

==== Women's events ====
Event	Gold	Silver	Bronze
Double National round	Queenie Newall; Great Britain	Charlotte Dod; Great Britain	Beatrice Hill-Lowe; Great Britain

=== 1920 Antwerp ===
Event	Gold	Silver	Bronze
Individual fixed large bird	Edmond Cloetens; Belgium	Louis Van de Perck; Belgium	Firmin Flamand; Belgium
Team fixed large bird	Belgium; Edmond Cloetens; Louis Van de Perck; Firmin Flamand; Edmond van Moer; Joseph Hermans; Auguste Van de Verre	None awarded	None awarded
Individual fixed small bird	Edmond van Moer; Belgium	Louis Van de Perck; Belgium	Joseph Hermans; Belgium
Team fixed small bird	Belgium; Edmond Cloetens; Louis Van de Perck; Firmin Flamand; Edmond van Moer; Joseph Hermans; Auguste Van de Verre	None awarded	None awarded
Individual moving bird, 28 m	Hubert Van Innis; Belgium	Léonce Quentin; France	None awarded
Team moving bird, 28 m	Netherlands; Janus Theeuwes; Driekske van Bussel; Joep Packbiers; Janus van Merrienboer; Jo van Gastel; Theo Willems; Piet de Brouwer; Tiest van Gestel	Belgium; Hubert Van Innis; Alphonse Allaert; Edmond de Knibber; Louis Delcon; Jérome De Maeyer; Pierre van Thielt; Louis Fierens; Louis van Beeck	France; Julien Brulé; Léonce Quentin; Pascal Fauvel; Eugène Grisot; Eugène Richez; Artur Mabellon; Léon Epin; Paul Leroy
Individual moving bird, 33 m	Hubert Van Innis; Belgium	Julien Brulé; France	None awarded
Team moving bird, 33 m	Belgium; Hubert Van Innis; Pierre van Thielt; Jérome De Maeyer; Alphonse Allaert; Edmond de Knibber; Louis Delcon; Louis van Beeck; Louis Fierens	France; Julien Brulé; Léonce Quentin; Pascal Fauvel; Eugène Grisot; Eugène Richez; Artur Mabellon; Léon Epin; Paul Leroy	None awarded
Individual moving bird, 50 m	Julien Brulé; France	Hubert Van Innis; Belgium	None awarded
Team moving bird, 50 m	Belgium; Hubert Van Innis; Pierre van Thielt; Jérome De Maeyer; Alphonse Allaert; Edmond de Knibber; Louis Delcon; Louis van Beeck; Louis Fierens	France; Julien Brulé; Léonce Quentin; Pascal Fauvel; Eugène Grisot; Eugène Richez; Artur Mabellon; Léon Epin; Paul Leroy	None awarded

== Statistics ==
The following table shows the most successful athletes in Olympic archery since 1972 by medals won:

Rank	Nation	Gold	Silver	Bronze	Total
1	Kim Woo-jin (KOR)	5	0	0	5
2	Kim Soo-nyung (KOR)	4	1	1	6
3	Park Sung-hyun (KOR)	3	1	0	4
4	Ki Bo-bae (KOR)	3	0	1	4
5	Lim Si-hyeon (KOR)	3	0	0	3
5	An San (KOR)	3	0	0	3
5	Kim Je-deok (KOR)	3	0	0	3
5	Yun Mi-jin (KOR)	3	0	0	3
9	Marco Galiazzo (ITA)	2	1	0	3
9	Park Kyung-mo (KOR)	2	1	0	3
9	Jang Yong-ho (KOR)	2	1	0	3
9	Lee Sung-jin (KOR)	2	1	0	3
9	Darrell Pace (USA)	2	1	0	3
14	Im Dong-hyun (KOR)	2	0	1	3
14	Oh Jin-hyek (KOR)	2	0	1	3
16	Cho Youn-jeong (KOR)	2	0	0	2
16	Ku Bon-chan (KOR)	2	0	0	2
16	Chang Hye-jin (KOR)	2	0	0	2
16	Kim Kyung-wook (KOR)	2	0	0	2
16	Justin Huish (USA)	2	0	0	2
21	Zhang Juanjuan (CHN)	1	2	0	3
21	Mauro Nespoli (ITA)	1	2	0	3
23	Michele Frangilli (ITA)	1	1	1	3
23	Oh Kyo-moon (KOR)	1	1	1	3
25	Tomi Poikolainen (FIN)	1	1	0	2
25	Wang Hee-kyung (KOR)	1	1	0	2
25	Park Sung-soo (KOR)	1	1	0	2
25	Nam Su-hyeon (KOR)	1	1	0	2
25	Kim Nam-soon (KOR)	1	1	0	2
25	Jay Barrs (USA)	1	1	0	2
31	Yun Young-sook (KOR)	1	0	1	2
31	Yun Ok-hee (KOR)	1	0	1	2
31	Lee Woo-seok (KOR)	1	0	1	2
31	Mete Gazoz (TUR)	1	0	1	2
31	Viktor Ruban (UKR)	1	0	1	2
31	Rod White (USA)	1	0	1	2
31	Butch Johnson (USA)	1	0	1	2
38	Simon Fairweather (AUS)	1	0	0	1
38	Antonio Vázquez (ESP)	1	0	0	1
38	Alfonso Menéndez (ESP)	1	0	0	1
38	Juan Holgado (ESP)	1	0	0	1
38	Sébastien Flute (FRA)	1	0	0	1
38	Choi Hyeon-ju (KOR)	1	0	0	1
38	Jang Min-hee (KOR)	1	0	0	1
38	Seo Hyang-soon (KOR)	1	0	0	1
38	Yoon Hye-young (KOR)	1	0	0	1
38	Lee Han-sup (KOR)	1	0	0	1
38	Joo Hyun-jung (KOR)	1	0	0	1
38	Choi Mi-sun (KOR)	1	0	0	1
38	Jeon Hun-young (KOR)	1	0	0	1
38	Lee Chang-hwan (KOR)	1	0	0	1
38	Chun In-soo (KOR)	1	0	0	1
38	Kang Chae-young (KOR)	1	0	0	1
38	Lee Seung-yun (KOR)	1	0	0	1
38	Kim Chung-tae (KOR)	1	0	0	1
38	Kim Jo-sun (KOR)	1	0	0	1
38	Lee Eun-kyung (KOR)	1	0	0	1
38	Keto Losaberidze (URS)	1	0	0	1
38	Luann Ryon (USA)	1	0	0	1
38	Doreen Wilber (USA)	1	0	0	1
38	John Williams (USA)	1	0	0	1
62	Brady Ellison (USA)	0	3	2	5
63	He Ying (CHN)	0	2	0	2
63	Elena Osipova (ROC)	0	2	0	2
63	Jean-Charles Valladont (FRA)	0	2	0	2
63	Ilario Di Buò (ITA)	0	2	0	2
63	Ksenia Perova (RUS)	0	2	0	2
63	Richard McKinney (USA)	0	2	0	2
63	Jake Kaminski (USA)	0	2	0	2
70	Takaharu Furukawa (JPN)	0	1	2	3
71	Barbara Mensing (GER)	0	1	1	2
71	Michelle Kroppen (GER)	0	1	1	2
71	Lisa Unruh (GER)	0	1	1	2
71	Cornelia Pfohl (GER)	0	1	1	2
71	Sandra Wagner-Sachse (GER)	0	1	1	2
71	Hiroshi Yamamoto (JPN)	0	1	1	2
71	Matteo Bisiani (ITA)	0	1	1	2
71	Olena Sadovnycha (UKR)	0	1	1	2
71	Vic Wunderle (USA)	0	1	1	2
80	Yang Xiaolei (CHN)	0	1	0	1
80	Cheng Ming (CHN)	0	1	0	1
80	Wang Xiaozhu (CHN)	0	1	0	1
80	Li Jiaman (CHN)	0	1	0	1
80	Chen Ling (CHN)	0	1	0	1
80	Lin Sang (CHN)	0	1	0	1
80	An Qixuan (CHN)	0	1	0	1
80	Li Lingjuan (CHN)	0	1	0	1
80	Fang Yuting (CHN)	0	1	0	1
80	Ma Xiangjun (CHN)	0	1	0	1
80	Chung Jae-hun (KOR)	0	1	0	1
80	Ismo Falck (FIN)	0	1	0	1
80	Jari Lipponen (FIN)	0	1	0	1
80	Baptiste Addis (FRA)	0	1	0	1
80	Thomas Chirault (FRA)	0	1	0	1
80	Florian Unruh (GER)	0	1	0	1
80	Guo Dan (CHN)	0	1	0	1
80	Lilies Handayani (INA)	0	1	0	1
80	Kusuma Wardhani (INA)	0	1	0	1
80	Nurfitriyana Saiman (INA)	0	1	0	1
80	Hiroshi Michinaga (JPN)	0	1	0	1
80	Kim Bo-ram (KOR)	0	1	0	1
80	Kateryna Serdyuk (UKR)	0	1	0	1
80	Aída Román (MEX)	0	1	0	1
80	Gabriela Schloesser (NED)	0	1	0	1
80	Steve Wijler (NED)	0	1	0	1
80	Irena Szydłowska (POL)	0	1	0	1
80	Svetlana Gomboeva (ROC)	0	1	0	1
80	Inna Stepanova (RUS)	0	1	0	1
80	Tuyana Dashidorzhieva (RUS)	0	1	0	1
80	Gunnar Jervill (SWE)	0	1	0	1
80	Magnus Petersson (SWE)	0	1	0	1
80	Deng Yu-cheng (TPE)	0	1	0	1
80	Wei Chun-heng (TPE)	0	1	0	1
80	Chen Szu-yuan (TPE)	0	1	0	1
80	Liu Ming-huang (TPE)	0	1	0	1
80	Wang Cheng-pang (TPE)	0	1	0	1
80	Tang Chih-chun (TPE)	0	1	0	1
80	Valentyna Kovpan (URS)	0	1	0	1
80	Natalya Butuzova (URS)	0	1	0	1
80	Nataliya Burdeyna (URS)	0	1	0	1
80	Boris Isachenko (URS)	0	1	0	1
80	Zach Garrett (USA)	0	1	0	1
80	Jacob Wukie (USA)	0	1	0	1
80	Wang Hong (CHN)	0	1	0	1
80	Xu Jing (CHN)	0	1	0	1
126	Natalia Valeeva (EUN)	0	0	2	2
126	Richard Priestman (GBR)	0	0	2	2
126	Steven Hallard (GBR)	0	0	2	2
126	Simon Terry (GBR)	0	0	2	2
126	Giancarlo Ferrari (ITA)	0	0	2	2
126	Alejandra Valencia (MEX)	0	0	2	2
132	Tim Cuddihy (AUS)	0	0	1	1
132	Ryan Tyack (AUS)	0	0	1	1
132	Taylor Worth (AUS)	0	0	1	1
132	Alec Potts (AUS)	0	0	1	1
132	Dai Xiaoxiang (CHN)	0	0	1	1
132	Li Wenquan (CHN)	0	0	1	1
132	Xue Haifeng (CHN)	0	0	1	1
132	Jiang Lin (CHN)	0	0	1	1
132	Khatuna Kvrivichvili (EUN)	0	0	1	1
132	Lyudmila Arzhanikova (EUN)	0	0	1	1
132	Kyösti Laasonen (FIN)	0	0	1	1
132	Päivi Meriluoto (FIN)	0	0	1	1
132	Sophie Dodemont (FRA)	0	0	1	1
132	Virginie Arnold (FRA)	0	0	1	1
132	Lisa Barbelin (FRA)	0	0	1	1
132	Bérengère Schuh (FRA)	0	0	1	1
132	Alison Williamson (GBR)	0	0	1	1
132	Charline Schwarz (GER)	0	0	1	1
132	Lucilla Boari (ITA)	0	0	1	1
132	Andrea Parenti (ITA)	0	0	1	1
132	Hiroki Muto (JPN)	0	0	1	1
132	Yuki Kawata (JPN)	0	0	1	1
132	Kaori Kawanaka (JPN)	0	0	1	1
132	Miki Kanie (JPN)	0	0	1	1
132	Ren Hayakawa (JPN)	0	0	1	1
132	Kim Bub-min (KOR)	0	0	1	1
132	Kim Jin-ho (KOR)	0	0	1	1
132	Leroy Watson (GBR)	0	0	1	1
132	Lin Shih-chia (TPE)	0	0	1	1
132	Luis Álvarez (MEX)	0	0	1	1
132	Ángela Ruiz (MEX)	0	0	1	1
132	Ana Paula Vázquez (MEX)	0	0	1	1
132	Mariana Avitia (MEX)	0	0	1	1
132	Wietse van Alten (NED)	0	0	1	1
132	Iwona Dzięcioł (POL)	0	0	1	1
132	Joanna Nowicka (POL)	0	0	1	1
132	Katarzyna Klata (POL)	0	0	1	1
132	Bair Badenov (RUS)	0	0	1	1
132	Chen Li-ju (TPE)	0	0	1	1
132	Wu Hui-ju (TPE)	0	0	1	1
132	Tan Ya-ting (TPE)	0	0	1	1
132	Yuan Shu-chi (TPE)	0	0	1	1
132	Lei Chien-ying (TPE)	0	0	1	1
132	Ulaş Tümer (TUR)	0	0	1	1
132	Muhammed Yıldırmış (TUR)	0	0	1	1
132	Dmytro Hrachov (UKR)	0	0	1	1
132	Oleksandr Serdyuk (UKR)	0	0	1	1
132	Vladimir Yesheyev (URS)	0	0	1	1
132	Zebiniso Rustamova (URS)	0	0	1	1
132	Emma Gapchenko (URS)	0	0	1	1
132	Deborah Ochs (USA)	0	0	1	1
132	Casey Kaufhold (USA)	0	0	1	1
132	Melanie Skillman (USA)	0	0	1	1
132	Denise Parker (USA)	0	0	1	1
