= Belgium at the Olympics =

- IOC code: BEL
- NOC: Belgian Olympic and Interfederal Committee
- Website: www.teambelgium.be (in Dutch and French)
- Medals Ranked 31st: Gold 49 Silver 59 Bronze 69 Total 177

Summer appearances
- 1900; 1904; 1908; 1912; 1920; 1924; 1928; 1932; 1936; 1948; 1952; 1956; 1960; 1964; 1968; 1972; 1976; 1980; 1984; 1988; 1992; 1996; 2000; 2004; 2008; 2012; 2016; 2020; 2024; 2028

Winter appearances
- 1924; 1928; 1932; 1936; 1948; 1952; 1956; 1960; 1964; 1968; 1972; 1976; 1980; 1984; 1988; 1992; 1994; 1998; 2002; 2006; 2010; 2014; 2018; 2022; 2026

Other related appearances
- 1906 Intercalated Games

Belgium has competed at most editions of the Olympic Games after making its first appearance at the 1900 Games. The nation was host to the 1920 Summer Olympics in Antwerp.

The National Olympic Committee for Belgium was created and recognized in 1906.

== Hosted Games ==
Belgium has hosted the Games on one occasion.

Games	Host city	Dates	Nations	Participants	Events
1920 Summer Olympics	Antwerp	20 April – 12 September	29	2,626	156

== Medal tables ==
=== Medals by Summer Games ===
Host country

Games	Athletes	Gold	Silver	Bronze	Total	Rank
(French Third Republic) 1900 Paris	78	6	7	5	18	4
(United States) 1904 St. Louis	did not participate					
(United Kingdom) 1908 London	88	1	5	2	8	10
(Sweden) 1912 Stockholm	36	2	1	3	6	13
(Belgium) 1920 Antwerp	336	14	11	11	36	5
(French Third Republic) 1924 Paris	172	3	7	3	13	10
(Netherlands) 1928 Amsterdam	186	0	1	2	3	29
(United States) 1932 Los Angeles	36	0	0	0	0	–
(Nazi Germany) 1936 Berlin	150	0	0	2	2	29
(United Kingdom) 1948 London	158	2	2	3	7	15
(Finland) 1952 Helsinki	135	2	2	0	4	14
(Australia) 1956 Melbourne	51	0	2	0	2	28
(Italy) 1960 Rome	101	0	2	2	4	26
(Japan) 1964 Tokyo	61	2	0	1	3	20
1968 Mexico City	82	0	1	1	2	36
(West Germany) 1972 Munich	88	0	2	0	2	29
(Canada) 1976 Montreal	110	0	3	3	6	28
(Soviet Union) 1980 Moscow	59	1	0	0	1	23
(United States) 1984 Los Angeles	63	1	1	2	4	21
(South Korea) 1988 Seoul	59	0	0	2	2	44
(Spain) 1992 Barcelona	68	0	1	2	3	44
(United States) 1996 Atlanta	61	2	2	2	6	31
(Australia) 2000 Sydney	68	0	2	3	5	55
(Greece) 2004 Athens	50	1	0	2	3	51
(China) 2008 Beijing	96	2	0	0	2	37
(United Kingdom) 2012 London	115	0	1	2	3	60
(Brazil) 2016 Rio de Janeiro	106	2	2	2	6	35
(Japan) 2020 Tokyo	121	3	1	3	7	29
(France) 2024 Paris	165	3	1	6	10	25
(United States) 2028 Los Angeles	future event					
(Australia) 2032 Brisbane	future event					
Total (28/30)	2,899	47	57	64	168	29

Notes

- ^{ART} Art competitions (1912–1948) are not included in the medal table above, as they were non-sports events formerly part of the Olympic Games. (Note: In 1952, art competition medals, as well as the gold medal awards for feats in alpinism and aeronautics, were removed from the official national medal counts. Only since 2021 have they been officially listed again by the IOC in the medal tables and respective National Olympic Committee (NOC) profiles on its website.) Belgium won a total of eight art competition medals (2 gold, 1 silver, and 5 bronze), across the 1920, 1932, and 1936 Summer Olympics.
- ^{MIX} At the 1900 Summer Olympics, the bronze medal in the football tournament, won by a student selection with players from the Université libre de Bruxelles competing as a mixed team—composed primarily of Belgian athletes alongside a few non-Belgian participants—was attributed to Belgium. (Note: Until 2024, the IOC classified all teams composed of athletes from different countries in the early Modern Olympic Games as mixed teams (IOC code ZZX), regardless of whether they represented an established club. Since 2024, teams representing a club have been attributed to the club's country, even if they included foreign athletes. Only ad hoc teams formed solely for the Olympic Games are now classified as mixed teams.)

=== Medals by Winter Games ===
Games	Athletes	Gold	Silver	Bronze	Total	Rank
(France) 1924 Chamonix	18	0	0	1	1	10
(Switzerland) 1928 St. Moritz	25	0	0	1	1	8
(United States) 1932 Lake Placid	5	0	0	0	0	–
(Nazi Germany) 1936 Garmisch-Partenkirchen	27	0	0	0	0	–
(Switzerland) 1948 St. Moritz	11	1	1	0	2	9
(Norway) 1952 Oslo	9	0	0	0	0	–
(Italy) 1956 Cortina d'Ampezzo	4	0	0	0	0	–
(United States) 1960 Squaw Valley	did not participate					
(Austria) 1964 Innsbruck	8	0	0	0	0	–
(France) 1968 Grenoble	did not participate					
(Japan) 1972 Sapporo	1	0	0	0	0	–
(Austria) 1976 Innsbruck	4	0	0	0	0	–
(United States) 1980 Lake Placid	2	0	0	0	0	–
(Socialist Federal Republic of Yugoslavia) 1984 Sarajevo	4	0	0	0	0	–
(Canada) 1988 Calgary	1	0	0	0	0	–
(France) 1992 Albertville	5	0	0	0	0	–
(Norway) 1994 Lillehammer	5	0	0	0	0	–
(Japan) 1998 Nagano	1	0	0	1	1	22
(United States) 2002 Salt Lake City	6	0	0	0	0	–
(Italy) 2006 Turin	4	0	0	0	0	–
(Canada) 2010 Vancouver	8	0	0	0	0	–
(Russia) 2014 Sochi	7	0	0	0	0	–
(South Korea) 2018 Pyeongchang	22	0	1	0	1	25
(China) 2022 Beijing	19	1	0	1	2	21
(Italy) 2026 Milano Cortina	30	0	0	1	1	29
(France) 2030 French Alps	future event					
(United States) 2034 Utah	future event					
Total (23/25)	226	2	2	5	9	38

=== Medals overall ===
Games	Gold	Silver	Bronze	Total	Rank
Summer Olympics	47	57	64	168	29
Winter Olympics	2	2	5	9	36
Total	49	59	69	177	31

=== Medals by summer sport ===
Sport	Gold	Silver	Bronze	Total
Archery	11	7	3	21
Cycling	9	9	14	32
Athletics	7	6	4	17
Equestrian	5	2	7	14
Fencing	3	3	4	10
Sailing	2	4	3	9
Judo	2	1	11	14
Shooting	1	5	3	9
Swimming	1	2	2	5
Weightlifting	1	2	1	4
Boxing	1	1	2	4
Field hockey	1	1	1	3
Gymnastics	1	1	1	3
Football	1	0	1	2
Tennis	1	0	1	2
Rowing	0	6	2	8
Water polo	0	4	2	6
Wrestling	0	3	0	3
Taekwondo	0	0	1	1
Tug of war	0	0	1	1
Totals (20 entries)	47	57	64	168

=== Medals by winter sport ===
Sport	Gold	Silver	Bronze	Total
Speed skating	1	1	1	3
Figure skating	1	0	1	2
Bobsleigh	0	1	1	2
Short track speed skating	0	0	2	2
Totals (4 entries)	2	2	5	9

=== Medals by gender ===
Sport	Gold	Silver	Bronze	Total
Male	41	57	53	151
Female	8	2	15	25
Mixed	0	0	1	1
Totals (3 entries)	49	59	69	177

== List of medalists ==
=== Summer Olympics ===
Medal	Name	Games	Sport	Event
Gold	Emmanuel Foulon	1900 Paris	Archery	Sur la Perche à la Herse
Gold	Hubert Van Innis	1900 Paris	Archery	Au Cordon Doré 33 metres
Gold	Hubert Van Innis	1900 Paris	Archery	Au Chapelet 33 metres
Gold	Aimé Haegeman	1900 Paris	Equestrian	Jumping
Gold	Constant van Langhendonck	1900 Paris	Equestrian	Long jump
Gold	Georges Nagelmackers	1900 Paris	Equestrian	Mail coach
Silver	Émile Druart	1900 Paris	Archery	Sur la Perche à la Herse
Silver	Hubert Van Innis	1900 Paris	Archery	Au Cordon Doré 50 metres
Silver	Hubert Van Innis	1900 Paris	Archery	Championnat du Monde
Silver	Georges Van Der Poele	1900 Paris	Equestrian	Jumping
Silver	Royal Club Nautique de Gand: Jules De Bisschop Prosper Bruggeman Oscar Dessomville Oscar De Cock Maurice Hemelsoet Marcel Van Crombrugge Frank Odberg Maurice Verdonck Alfred Van Landeghem	1900 Paris	Rowing	Men's eight
Silver	Brussels Swimming and Water Polo Club: Jean de Backer Victor de Behr Henri Cohen Fernand Feyaerts Oscar Grégoire Albert Michant Victor Sonnemans	1900 Paris	Water polo	Water polo
Silver	René Guyot	1900 Paris	Shooting	Men's trap
Bronze	Louis Glineur	1900 Paris	Archery	Sur la Perche à la Pyramide
Bronze	Georges Van Der Poele	1900 Paris	Equestrian	High jump
Bronze	Charles Paumier du Verger	1900 Paris	Shooting	300 metre free rifle, standing
Bronze	Paul Van Asbroeck	1900 Paris	Shooting	300 metre free rifle, three positions
Bronze	Université de Bruxelles: Marius Delbecque; Hendrik van Heuckelum (NED); Raul Kelecom; Marcel Leboutte; Lucien Londot; Ernest Moreau de Melen; Eugène Neefs; Gustave Pelgrims; Alphonse Renier; Hilaire Spanoghe; Eric Thornton (GBR)	1900 Paris	Football	Men's tournament
Gold	Paul Van Asbroeck	1908 London	Shooting	Men's 50 yd free pistol
Silver	Oscar de Somville, Marcel Morimont, Georges Mys, Rémy Orban, Rodolphe Poma, Oscar Taelman, Alfred Van Landeghem, Polydore Veirman, François Vergucht	1908 London	Rowing	Men's eight
Silver	Léon Huybrechts, Louis Huybrechts, Henri Weewauters	1908 London	Sailing	6 m class
Silver	Réginald Storms	1908 London	Shooting	Men's 50 yd free pistol
Silver	René Englebert, Charles Paumier du Verger, Réginald Storms, Paul Van Asbroeck	1908 London	Shooting	Men's 50 yd free pistol, team
Silver	Water polo team: Victor Boin Herman Donners Fernand Feyaerts Oscar Grégoire Herman Meyboom Albert Michant Joseph Pletinckx	1908 London	Water polo	Men's tournament
Bronze	Joseph Werbrouck	1908 London	Cycling	Men's 20 km
Bronze	Paul Anspach, Désiré Beaurain, Ferdinand Feyerick, François Rom	1908 London	Fencing	Men's team épée
Gold	Paul Anspach	1912 Stockholm	Fencing	Men's épée
Gold	Paul Anspach, Henri Anspach, Robert Hennet, Fernand de Montigny, Jacques Ochs, François Rom, Gaston Salmon and Victor Willems	1912 Stockholm	Fencing	Men's team épée
Silver	Polydore Veirman	1912 Stockholm	Rowing	Men's single sculls
Bronze	Emmanuel de Blommaert	1912 Stockholm	Equestrian	Individual jumping
Bronze	Philippe Le Hardy De Beaulieu	1912 Stockholm	Fencing	Men's épée
Bronze	Water polo team: Albert Durant Herman Donners Victor Boin Herman Meyboom Joseph Pletincx Oscar Grégoire Félicien Courbet Jean Hoffman Pierre Nijs	1912 Stockholm	Water polo	Men's tournament
Gold	Edmond Cloetens	1920 Antwerp	Archery	Men's individual fixed large bird
Gold	Edmond Cloetens; Louis van de Perck; Firmin Flamand; Edmond van Moer; Joseph Hermans; Auguste van de Verre	1920 Antwerp	Archery	Men's team fixed large bird
Gold	Edmond Cloetens; Louis van de Perck; Firmin Flamand; Edmond van Moer; Joseph Hermans; Auguste van de Verre	1920 Antwerp	Archery	Men's team fixed small bird
Gold	Edmond van Moer	1920 Antwerp	Archery	Men's Individual fixed small bird
Gold	Hubert Van Innis; Alphonse Allaert; Edmond de Knibber; Louis Delcon; Jérome de Mayer; Pierre van Thielt; Louis Fierens; Louis van Beeck	1920 Antwerp	Archery	Men's team moving bird 33 m
Gold	Hubert Van Innis; Alphonse Allaert; Edmond de Knibber; Louis Delcon; Jérome de Mayer; Pierre van Thielt; Louis Fierens; Louis van Beeck	1920 Antwerp	Archery	Men's team moving bird 50 m
Gold	Hubert Van Innis	1920 Antwerp	Archery	Men's individual moving bird 28 m
Gold	Hubert Van Innis	1920 Antwerp	Archery	Men's individual moving bird 33 m
Gold	Henry George	1920 Antwerp	Cycling	Men's 50 km
Gold	Daniel Bouckaert	1920 Antwerp	Equestrian	Individual vaulting
Gold	Daniel Bouckaert; Louis Finet; Maurice Van Ranst van Schauwbroeck; Albert van Cauwenberg	1920 Antwerp	Equestrian	Team vaulting
Gold	National football team: Félix Balyu Désiré Bastin Mathieu Bragard Julien Cnudde Robert Coppée Jean De Bie Léopold De Groof François Dogaer André Fierens Émile Hanse Georges Hebdin Henri Larnoe Georges Michel Joseph Musch Fernand Nisot August Pelsmaeker Armand Swartenbroeks Ivan Thys Louis van Hege Léon Vandermeiren Oscar Verbeeck Fernand Wertz	1920 Antwerp	Football	Men's tournament
Gold	Emile Cornellie; Florimond Cornellie; Frédéric Bruynseels	1920 Antwerp	Sailing	Men's 6 m class
Gold	Frans de Haes	1920 Antwerp	Weightlifting	Featherweight
Silver	Louis van de Perck	1920 Antwerp	Archery	Men's individual fixed large bird
Silver	Louis van de Perck	1920 Antwerp	Archery	Men's individual fixed small bird
Silver	Hubert Van Innis; Alphonse Allaert; Edmond de Knibber; Louis Delcon; Jérome de Mayer; Pierre van Thielt; Louis Fierens; Louis van Beeck	1920 Antwerp	Archery	Men's team moving bird 28 m
Silver	Hubert Van Innis	1920 Antwerp	Archery	Men's individual moving bird 50 m
Silver	Roger Moeremans d'Emaüs; Oswald Lints; Jules Bonvalet; Jacques Misonne	1920 Antwerp	Equestrian	Team jumping
Silver	Paul Anspach; Léon Tom; Ernest Gevers; Félix Goblet D'aviella; Victor Boin; Joseph De Craecker; Philippe Le Hardy De Beaulieu; Fernand de Montigny	1920 Antwerp	Fencing	Men's team épée
Silver	Men's team: Eugenius Auwerkerken Théophile Bauer François Claessens Augustus Cootmans Frans Gibens Albert Haepers Domien Jacob Félicien Kempeneers Jules Labéeu Hubert Lafortune Auguste Landrieu Charles Lannie Constant Loriot Nicolaas Moerloos Ferdinand Minnaert Louis Stoop Jean Van Guysse Alphonse Van Mele François Verboven Jean Verboven Julien Verdonck Joseph Verstraeten Georges Vivex Julianus Wagemans	1920 Antwerp	Gymnastics	Men's team all-around
Silver	Léon Huybrechts; Charles van den Bussche; John Klotz	1920 Antwerp	Sailing	6 m class (1919 rating)
Silver	Albert Bosquet; Joseph Cogels; Emile Dupont; Henri Quersin; Louis van Tilt; Edouard Fesinger	1920 Antwerp	Shooting	Men's Team clay pigeons
Silver	Albert Durant; Gérard Blitz; Maurice Blitz; Joseph Pletincx; Paul Gailly; Pierre Nijs; René Bauwens; Pierre Dewin	1920 Antwerp	Water polo	Men's team competition
Silver	Louis Williquet	1920 Antwerp	Weightlifting	Men's lightweight
Bronze	Firmin Flamand	1920 Antwerp	Archery	Men's individual fixed large bird
Bronze	Joseph Hermans	1920 Antwerp	Archery	Men's individual fixed small bird
Bronze	Albert de Buinne; André Vercruysse; Bernard Janssens; Albert Wyckmans	1920 Antwerp	Cycling	Men's Team Time Trial
Bronze	Roger Moeremans d'Emaüs; Oswald Lints; Jules Bonvalet; Jacques Misonne	1920 Antwerp	Equestrian	Men's Team three-day event
Bronze	Louis Finet	1920 Antwerp	Equestrian	Individual vaulting
Bronze	Men's team: Paul Arets Léon Bronckaert Léopold Clabots Jean-Baptiste Claessens Léon Darrien Lucien Dehoux Ernest Deleu Émile Duboisson Ernest Dureuil Joseph Fiems Marcel Hansen Louis Henin Omer Hoffman Félix Logiest Charles Maerschalck René Paenhuijsen Arnold Pierrot René Pinchart Gaspard Pirotte Augustien Pluys Léopold Son Édouard Taeymans Pierre Thiriar Henri Verhavert	1920 Antwerp	Gymnastics	Men's team Swedish system
Bronze	Field hockey team: André Becquet Pierre Chibert Raoul Daufresne de la Chevalerie Fernand de Montigny Charles Delelienne Louis Diercxsens Robert Gevers Adolphe Goemaere Charles Gniette Raymond Keppens René Strauwen Pierre Valcke Maurice van den Bemden Jean van Nerom	1920 Antwerp	Field hockey	Men's tournament
Bronze	Albert Grisar; Willy de l'Arbre; Léopold Standaert; Henri Weewauters; Georges Hellebuyck	1920 Antwerp	Sailing	8 metre class (1919 rating)
Bronze	Gerard Blitz	1920 Antwerp	Swimming	Men's 100 m backstroke
Bronze	Men's team	1920 Antwerp	Tug of war	Men's
Bronze	Georges Rooms	1920 Antwerp	Weightlifting	Men's lightweight
Gold	Jean Delarge	1924 Paris	Boxing	Men's welterweight
Gold	Charles Delporte	1924 Paris	Fencing	Men's épée
Gold	Léon Huybrechts	1924 Paris	Sailing	Monotype Class
Silver	Henri Hoevenaers	1924 Paris	Cycling (Road)	Men's individual time trial
Silver	Henri Hoevenaers; Auguste Parfondry; Jean Van Den Bosch	1924 Paris	Cycling (Road)	Men's team time trial
Silver	Paul Anspach; Joseph De Craecker; Charles Delporte; Fernand de Montigny; Ernest Gevers; Léon Tom	1924 Paris	Fencing	Men's team épée
Silver	Désiré Beaurain; Charles Crahay; Fernand de Montigny; Maurice Van Damme; Marcel Berré; Albert De Roocker	1924 Paris	Fencing	Men's team foil
Silver	Joseph De Combe	1924 Paris	Swimming	Men's 200 m breaststroke
Silver	Water polo team: Gérard Blitz; Maurice Blitz; Joseph Cludts; Joseph De Combe; Pierre Dewin; Albert Durant; Georges Fleurix; Paul Gailly; Joseph Pletinckx; Jules Thiry; Jean-Pierre Vermetten	1924 Paris	Water polo	Men's team competition
Silver	Pierre Ollivier	1924 Paris	Wrestling	Men's freestyle middleweight
Bronze	Joseph Jules Beecken	1924 Paris	Boxing	Men's middleweight
Bronze	Léonard Daghelinckx; Henri Hoevenaers; Fernand Saive; Jean Van Den Bosch	1924 Paris	Cycling	Men's team pursuit
Bronze	Maurice Van Damme	1924 Paris	Fencing	Men's foil
Silver	Edmond Spapen	1928 Amsterdam	Wrestling	Men's freestyle bantamweight
Bronze	Léonard Steyaert	1928 Amsterdam	Boxing	Men's middleweight
Bronze	Georges Anthony; François de Coninck; Léon Flament	1928 Amsterdam	Rowing	Men's coxed pair
Bronze	Auguste Garrebeek; Armand Putzeys; François Vandermotte	1936 Berlin	Cycling (Road)	Men's team road race
Bronze	Water polo team: Henri Disy Pierre Coppieters Albert Castelyns Gérard Blitz Fernand Isselé Joseph De Combe Henri Stoelen Henri De Pauw Edmond Michiels	1936 Berlin	Water polo	Men's team competition
Gold	Gaston Reiff	1948 London	Athletics	Men's 5,000 m
Gold	Léon Delathouwer; Eugène van Roosbroeck; Lode Wouters	1948 London	Cycling	Men's team road race
Silver	Pierre Nihant	1948 London	Cycling (Track)	Men's 1,000 m time trial
Silver	Joseph Vissers	1948 London	Boxing	Men's lightweight
Bronze	Etienne Gailly	1948 London	Athletics	Men's marathon
Bronze	Lode Wouters	1948 London	Cycling (Road)	Men's individual race
Bronze	Men's foil team: Paul Valcke; André van de Werve de Vorsselaer; Raymond Bru; Edouard Yves; Georges de Bourguignon; Henri Paternoster	1948 London	Fencing	Men's foil team competition
Gold	André Noyelle	1952 Helsinki	Cycling (Road)	Men's individual race
Gold	Robert Grondelaers; André Noyelle; Lucien Victor	1952 Helsinki	Cycling (Road)	Men's team race
Silver	Robert Grondelaers	1952 Helsinki	Cycling (Road)	Men's individual race
Silver	Bob Baetens; Michel Knuysen	1952 Helsinki	Rowing	Men's coxless pairs
Silver	André Nelis	1956 Melbourne	Sailing	Men's finn individual competition
Silver	Joseph Mewis	1956 Melbourne	Wrestling	Men's freestyle featherweight
Silver	Roger Moens	1960 Rome	Athletics	Men's 800 m
Silver	Leo Sterckx	1960 Rome	Cycling (Track)	Men's sprint
Bronze	Willy van den Berghen	1960 Rome	Cycling (Road)	Men's individual road race
Bronze	André Nelis	1960 Rome	Sailing	Men's finn class
Gold	Gaston Roelants	1964 Tokyo	Athletics	Men's 3,000 m steeplechase
Gold	Patrick Sercu	1964 Tokyo	Cycling (Track)	Men's 1,000 m time trial
Bronze	Walter Godefroot	1964 Tokyo	Cycling	Men's individual road race
Silver	Serge Reding	1968 Mexico City	Weightlifting	Men's heavyweight
Bronze	Daniel Goens; Robert van Lancker	1968 Mexico City	Cycling	Men's tandem
Silver	Emiel Puttemans	1972 Munich	Athletics	Men's 10,000 m
Silver	Karel Lismont	1972 Munich	Athletics	Men's marathon
Silver	Ivo van Damme	1976 Montreal	Athletics	Men's 800 m
Silver	Ivo van Damme	1976 Montreal	Athletics	Men's 1500 m
Silver	Michel Vaarten	1976 Montreal	Cycling (Track)	Men's 1000 m time trial
Bronze	Karel Lismont	1976 Montreal	Athletics	Men's marathon
Bronze	François Mathy	1976 Montreal	Equestrian	Individual jumping
Bronze	Men's jumping team: Edgar-Henri Cuepper; François Mathy; Stanny van Paesschen; Eric Wauters	1976 Montreal	Equestrian	Men's team jumping
Gold	Robert Van de Walle	1980 Moscow	Judo	Men's 95 kg
Gold	Roger Ilegems	1984 Los Angeles	Cycling (Track)	Men's points race
Silver	Dirk Crois; Pierre-Marie Deloof	1984 Los Angeles	Rowing	Men's double sculls
Bronze	Ann Haesebrouck	1984 Los Angeles	Rowing	Women's single sculls
Bronze	Ingrid Lempereur	1984 Los Angeles	Swimming	Women's 200 m breaststroke
Bronze	Robert Van de Walle	1988 Seoul	Judo	Men's 95 kg
Bronze	Frans Peeters	1988 Seoul	Shooting	Men's trap
Silver	Annelies Bredael	1992 Barcelona	Rowing	Women's single sculls
Bronze	Cédric Mathy	1992 Barcelona	Cycling	Men's points race
Bronze	Heidi Rakels	1992 Barcelona	Judo	Women's 66 kg
Gold	Ulla Werbrouck	1996 Atlanta	Judo	Women's 72 kg
Gold	Fred Deburghgraeve	1996 Atlanta	Swimming	Men's 100 m breaststroke
Silver	Gella Vandecaveye	1996 Atlanta	Judo	Women's 61 kg
Silver	Sébastien Godefroid	1996 Atlanta	Sailing	Men's finn class
Bronze	Harry Van Barneveld	1996 Atlanta	Judo	Men's +95 kg
Bronze	Marisabel Lomba	1996 Atlanta	Judo	Women's 56 kg
Silver	Filip Meirhaeghe	2000 Sydney	Cycling	Men's mountain biking
Silver	Etienne De Wilde; Matthew Gilmore	2000 Sydney	Cycling (Track)	Men's madison
Bronze	Ann Simons	2000 Sydney	Judo	Women's 48kg
Bronze	Gella Vandecaveye	2000 Sydney	Judo	Women's 63kg
Bronze	Els Callens; Dominique Van Roost	2000 Sydney	Tennis	Women's doubles
Gold	Justine Henin-Hardenne	2004 Athens	Tennis	Women's singles
Bronze	Axel Merckx	2004 Athens	Cycling (Road)	Men's road race
Bronze	Ilse Heylen	2004 Athens	Judo	Women's 52 kg
Gold^{[a]}	Women's 4 x 100m relay team: Olivia Borlée; Kim Gevaert; Hanna Mariën; Élodie Ouédraogo	2008 Beijing	Athletics	Women's 4 × 100 m relay
Gold	Tia Hellebaut	2008 Beijing	Athletics	Women's high jump
Silver	Lionel Cox	2012 London	Shooting	Men's 50 m rifle prone
Bronze	Charline Van Snick	2012 London	Judo	Women's 48 kg
Bronze	Evi Van Acker	2012 London	Sailing	Women's laser radial
Gold	Nafissatou Thiam	2016 Rio de Janeiro	Athletics	Women's heptathlon
Gold	Greg Van Avermaet	2016 Rio de Janeiro	Cycling (Road)	Men's road race
Silver	Field hockey team: Arthur Van Doren; John-John Dohmen; Florent van Aubel; Sebastien Dockier; Cédric Charlier; Gauthier Boccard; Emmanuel Stockbroekx; Thomas Briels; Felix Denayer; Vincent Vanasch; Simon Gougnard; Loïck Luypaert; Tom Boon; Jérôme Truyens; Elliot Van Strydonck; Tanguy Cosyns	2016 Rio de Janeiro	Field hockey	Men's tournament
Silver	Pieter Timmers	2016 Rio de Janeiro	Swimming	Men's 100 m freestyle
Bronze	Jolien D'Hoore	2016 Rio de Janeiro	Cycling (Track)	Women's omnium
Bronze	Dirk Van Tichelt	2016 Rio de Janeiro	Judo	Men's 73 kg
Gold	Nafissatou Thiam	2020 Tokyo	Athletics	Women's heptathlon
Gold	Field hockey team: Arthur Van Doren; John-John Dohmen; Florent Van Aubel; Sébastien Dockier; Cédric Charlier; Gauthier Boccard; Nicolas De Kerpel; Augustin Meurmans; Alexander Hendrickx; Thomas Briels; Félix Denayer; Vincent Vanasch; Simon Gougnard; Arthur De Sloover; Antoine Kina; Loïck Luypaert; Victor Wegnez; Tom Boon	2020 Tokyo	Field hockey	Men's tournament
Gold	Nina Derwael	2020 Tokyo	Gymnastics	Women's uneven bars
Silver	Wout van Aert	2020 Tokyo	Cycling (Road)	Men's road race
Bronze	Bashir Abdi	2020 Tokyo	Athletics	Men's marathon
Bronze	Men's jumping team: Pieter Devos on Claire Z; Jérôme Guery on Quelle Homme de Hus; Greégory Wathelet on Nevados S	2020 Tokyo	Equestrian	Men's team jumping
Bronze	Matthias Casse	2020 Tokyo	Judo	Men's 81 kg
Gold	Remco Evenepoel	2024 Paris	Cycling	Men's road time trial
Gold	Remco Evenepoel	2024 Paris	Cycling	Men's individual road race
Gold	Nafissatou Thiam	2024 Paris	Athletics	Women's heptathlon
Silver	Bashir Abdi	2024 Paris	Athletics	Men's marathon
Bronze	Wout Van Aert	2024 Paris	Cycling	Men's road time trial
Bronze	Gabriella Willems	2024 Paris	Judo	Women's 70 kg
Bronze	Lotte Kopecky	2024 Paris	Cycling	Women's individual road race
Bronze	Fabio Van den Bossche	2024 Paris	Cycling	Men's omnium
Bronze	Noor Vidts	2024 Paris	Athletics	Women's heptathlon
Bronze	Sarah Chaâri	2024 Paris	Taekwondo	Women's 67 kg

- ^{a} Russian team's gold medals were stripped due to anti-doping rules violation by Yulia Chermoshanskaya.

=== Winter Olympics ===
Medal	Name	Games	Sport	Event
Bronze	Charles Mulder; René Mortiaux; Paul van den Broeck; Victor Verschueren; Henri Willems	1924 Chamonix	Bobsleigh	Four/five-man
Bronze	Robert van Zeebroeck	1928 St. Moritz	Figure skating	Men's singles
Gold	Micheline Lannoy; Pierre Baugniet	1948 St. Moritz	Figure skating	Pairs
Silver	Max Houben; Freddy Mansveld; Louis-Georges Niels; Jacques Mouvet	1948 St. Moritz	Bobsleigh	Four-man
Bronze	Bart Veldkamp	1998 Nagano	Speed skating	Men's 5,000 m
Silver	Bart Swings	2018 Pyeongchang	Speed skating	Men's mass start
Gold	Bart Swings	2022 Beijing	Speed skating	Men's mass start
Bronze	Hanne Desmet	2022 Beijing	Short track speed skating	Women's 1000 metres
Bronze	Hanne Desmet; Stijn Desmet; Ward Pétré; Tineke den Dulk	2026 Milano Cortina	Short track speed skating	Mixed 2000 metre relay

== Summary by sport ==
=== Aquatics ===
==== Diving ====
Games	Divers	Events	Gold	Silver	Bronze	Total
1908 London	1	1/2	0	0	0	0
1920 Antwerp	3	2/5	0	0	0	0
1924 Paris	2	3/5	0	0	0	0
1984 Los Angeles	1	2/4	0	0	0	0
1988 Seoul	1	2/4	0	0	0	0
1992 Barcelona	1	1/4	0	0	0	0
Total	9	11/138	0	0	0	0

==== Swimming ====
Belgium's Olympic debut included one swimmer, who entered the men's 4000 metre freestyle and did not finish the first round (semifinals).

Games	Swimmers	Events	Gold	Silver	Bronze	Total
1900 Paris	1	1/7	0	0	0	0
1908 London	7	3/6	0	0	0	0
1920 Antwerp	12	7/10	0	0	1	1
1924 Paris	6	3/11	0	1	0	1
1928 Amsterdam	5	4/11	0	0	0	0
1948 London	6	5/11	0	0	0	0
1952 Helsinki	10	6/11	0	0	0	0
1956 Melbourne	6	4/13	0	0	0	0
1960 Rome	3	3/15	0	0	0	0
1964 Tokyo	2	2/18	0	0	0	0
1968 Mexico City	6	9/29	0	0	0	0
1972 München	4	8/29	0	0	0	0
1976 Montreal	10	17/26	0	0	0	0
1980 Moscow	7	15/26	0	0	0	0
1984 Los Angeles	4	5/29	0	0	1	1
1988 Seoul	7	13/31	0	0	0	0
1992 Barcelona	7	18/31	0	0	0	0
1996 Atlanta	4	11/32	1	0	0	1
2000 Sydney	9	16/32	0	0	0	0
2008 Beijing	7	9/34	0	0	0	0
2012 London	13	12/34	0	0	0	0
2016 Rio de Janeiro	10	11/34	0	1	0	1
2020 Tokyo	2	4/37	0	0	0	0
2024 Paris	4	8/37	0	0	0	0
Total	152	193/626	1	2	2	5

==== Water polo ====
Games	waterpolo teams	Events	Gold	Silver	Bronze	Total
1900 Paris	1	1/1	0	1	0	1
1908 London	1	1/1	0	1	0	1
1912 Stockholm	1	1/1	0	0	1	1
1920 Antwerp	1	1/1	0	1	0	1
1924 Paris	1	1/1	0	1	0	1
1928 Amsterdam	1	1/1	0	0	0	0
1936 Berlin	1	1/1	0	0	1	1
1948 London	1	1/1	0	0	0	0
1952 Helsinki	1	1/1	0	0	0	0
1960 Rome	1	1/1	0	0	0	0
1964 Tokyo	1	1/1	0	0	0	0
Total	11	11/36	0	4	2	6

=== Archery ===
Archery was one of the sports in which Belgium competed in the nation's first appearance in 1900. The Belgian archers took the gold medal in 3 of the 7 events in Paris, finishing with 7 medals total.

Games	Archers	Events	Gold	Silver	Bronze	Total
1900 Paris	18	7/7	3	3	1	7
1920 Antwerp	14	10/10	8	4	2	14
1972 München	3	1/2	0	0	0	0
1976 Montreal	2	1/2	0	0	0	0
1980 Montreal	2	1/2	0	0	0	0
1984 Los Angeles	4	2/2	0	0	0	0
1988 Seoul	3	1/4	0	0	0	0
1992 Barcelona	1	1/4	0	0	0	0
1996 Atlanta	1	1/4	0	0	0	0
2000 Sydney	1	1/4	0	0	0	0
2016 Rio de Janeiro	1	1/4	0	0	0	0
2020 Tokyo	1	1/5	0	0	0	0
Total	52	28/76	11	7	3	21

=== Boxing ===
Games	Boxers	Events	Gold	Silver	Bronze	Total
1920 Antwerp	13	7/8	0	0	0	0
1924 Paris	10	7/8	1	0	1	2
1928 Amsterdam	6	6/8	0	0	1	1
1936 Berlin	8	8/8	0	0	0	0
1948 London	8	8/8	0	1	0	1
1952 Helsinki	5	5/10	0	0	0	0
1960 Rome	4	4/10	0	0	0	0
1976 Montreal	1	1/11	0	0	0	0
1992 Barcelona	1	1/12	0	0	0	0
2024 Paris	3	3/13	0	0	0	0
Total	59	50/278	1	1	2	4

=== Cycling ===
Belgium's debut in 1900 included one cyclist.

Games	Cyclists	Events	Gold	Silver	Bronze	Total
1900 Paris	1	1/3	0	0	0	0
1908 London	6	6/7	0	0	1	1
1912 Stockholm	1	1/1	0	0	0	0
1920 Antwerp	15	6/6	1	0	1	2
1924 Paris	9	5/6	0	2	1	3
1928 Amsterdam	8	5/6	0	0	0	0
1936 Berlin	8	6/6	0	0	1	1
1948 London	12	6/6	1	1	1	3
1952 Helsinki	11	6/6	2	1	0	3
1956 Melbourne	7	5/6	0	0	0	0
1960 Rome	13	5/6	0	1	1	2
1964 Tokyo	10	6/7	1	0	1	2
1968 Mexico City	15	7/7	0	0	1	1
1972 München	14	7/7	0	0	0	0
1976 Montreal	7	5/6	0	1	0	1
1980 Moscow	12	5/6	0	0	0	0
1984 Los Angeles	8	5/8	1	0	0	0
1988 Seoul	6	3/9	0	0	0	0
1992 Barcelona	7	6/10	0	0	1	1
1996 Atlanta	9	4/14	0	0	0	1
2000 Sydney	13	4/18	0	2	0	2
2004 Athens	9	6/18	0	0	1	1
2008 Beijing	11	6/18	0	0	0	0
2012 London	16	9/18	0	0	0	0
2016 Rio de Janeiro	14	9/18	1	0	1	2
2020 Tokyo	15	11/22	0	1	0	1
2024 Paris	21	15/22	2	0	3	5
Total	278	160/286	9	9	14	32

=== Equestrian ===
Belgium competed at the first equestrian events in 1900, winning gold medals in three of the five events.

Games	Riders	Events	Gold	Silver	Bronze	Total
1900 Paris	15	5/5	3	1	1	5
1912 Stockholm	4	5/5	0	0	1	1
1920 Antwerp	18	7/7	2	1	2	5
1924 Paris	11	5/5	0	0	0	0
1928 Amsterdam	9	6/6	0	0	0	0
1936 Berlin	3	2/6	0	0	0	0
1956 Melbourne	3	2/6	0	0	0	0
1960 Rome	2	1/6	0	0	0	0
1972 München	4	2/6	0	0	0	0
1976 Montreal	4	2/6	0	0	2	2
1984 Los Angeles	3	2/6	0	0	0	0
1988 Seoul	1	1/6	0	0	0	0
1992 Barcelona	8	4/6	0	0	0	0
1996 Atlanta	5	3/6	0	0	0	0
2000 Sydney	6	3/6	0	0	0	0
2004 Athens	9	4/6	0	0	0	0
2008 Beijing	3	2/6	0	0	0	0
2012 London	10	5/6	0	0	0	0
2016 Rio de Janeiro	5	3/6	0	0	0	0
2020 Tokyo	8	5/6	0	0	1	1
2024 Paris	9	6/6	0	0	0	0
Total	140	75/160	5	2	7	14

=== Fencing ===
Belgium's Olympic debut in 1900 included five fencers, one of whom reached the final pool but who won no medals.

Games	Fencers	Events	Gold	Silver	Bronze	Total
1900 Paris	5	4/7	0	0	0	0
1904 Saint Louis	0	0/5	0	0	0	0
1908 London	18	4/4	0	0	1	1
1912 Stockholm	12	4/5	2	0	1	3
1920 Antwerp	22	6/6	0	1	0	1
1924 Paris	21	6/7	1	2	1	4
1928 Amsterdam	21	7/7	0	0	0	0
1932 Los Angeles	7	5/7	0	0	0	0
1936 Berlin	20	6/7	0	0	0	0
1948 London	18	6/7	0	0	1	1
1952 Helsinki	14	6/7	0	0	0	0
1956 Melbourne	6	5/7	0	0	0	0
1960 Rome	16	7/8	0	0	0	0
1964 Tokyo	2	2/8	0	0	0	0
1968 Mexico City	3	3/8	0	0	0	0
1972 Munich	1	1/8	0	0	0	0
1976 Montreal	4	3/8	0	0	0	0
1980 Moscow	3	3/8	0	0	0	0
1984 Los Angeles	4	3/8	0	0	0	0
1988 Seoul	3	3/8	0	0	0	0
2004 Athens	1	1/10	0	0	0	0
2016 Rio de Janeiro	1	1/10	0	0	0	0
2024 Paris	1	1/12	0	0	0	0
Total	203		3	3	4	10

=== Field hockey ===
Belgium's Olympic debut was in 1920 as the host nation. They won the bronze medal. Their best result was the gold medal in 2020.

Games	Teams	Events	Gold	Silver	Bronze	Total
1920 Antwerp	1	1/1	0	0	1	1
1928 Amsterdam	1	1/1	0	0	0	0
1936 Berlin	1	1/1	0	0	0	0
1948 London	1	1/1	0	0	0	0
1928 Helsinki	1	1/1	0	0	0	0
1956 Melbourne	1	1/1	0	0	0	0
1960 Rome	1	1/1	0	0	0	0
1964 Tokyo	1	1/1	0	0	0	0
1968 Mexico City	1	1/1	0	0	0	0
1972 Munich	1	1/1	0	0	0	0
1976 Montreal	1	1/1	0	0	0	0
2008 Beijing	1	1/2	0	0	0	0
2012 London	2	2/2	0	0	0	0
2016 Rio de Janeiro	1	1/2	0	1	0	1
2020 Tokyo	1	1/2	1	0	0	1
2024 Paris	2	2/2	0	0	0	0
Total	18	18/32	1	1	1	3

=== Football ===
Belgium's Olympic debut in 1900 included a men's football team, which is currently recognized as bronze medalists. The team's next appearance was as the host of the 1920 Games, at which the Belgian men won gold. Belgium competed again at the next two Games (1924 and 1928), but then did not appear again until 2008. That year, Belgium reached the semifinals but then lost twice to finish fourth.

Belgium has not appeared at the Olympics in women's soccer.

Games	Teams	Events	Gold	Silver	Bronze	Total
1900 Paris	1	1/1	0	0	1	1
1920 Antwerp	1	1/1	1	0	0	1
1924 Paris	1	1/1	0	0	0	0
1928 Amsterdam	1	1/1	0	0	0	0
2008 Beijing	1	1/2	0	0	0	0
Total	5	5/36	1	0	1	2

=== Gymnastics ===
==== Artistic ====
Belgium's Olympic debut in 1900 included two gymnasts who competed in the men's individual all-around.

Games	Gymnasts	Events	Gold	Silver	Bronze	Total
1900 Paris	2	1/1	0	0	0	0
1908 London	2	1/2	0	0	0	0
1920 Antwerp	48	3/4	0	1	1	2
1948 London	8	1/9	0	0	0	0
1952 Helsinki	3	7/15	0	0	0	0
1960 Rome	5	12/15	0	0	0	0
1964 Tokyo	1	5/14	0	0	0	0
1968 Mexico City	2	5/14	0	0	0	0
1976 Montreal	2	1/14	0	0	0	0
1988 Seoul	1	1/14	0	0	0	0
1992 Barcelona	1	1/14	0	0	0	0
1996 Atlanta	1	1/14	0	0	0	0
2000 Sydney	1	1/14	0	0	0	0
2004 Athens	1	1/14	0	0	0	0
2008 Beijing	2	2/14	0	0	0	0
2012 London	2	2/14	0	0	0	0
2016 Rio de Janeiro	6	4/14	0	0	0	0
2020 Tokyo	4	3/14	1	0	0	1
2024 Paris	5	4/14	0	0	0	0
Total	97	56/344	1	1	1	3

==== Rhythmic ====
Games	Gymnasts	Events	Gold	Silver	Bronze	Total
1984 Los Angeles	1	1/1	0	0	0	0
1988 Seoul	1	1/1	0	0	0	0
1992 Barcelona	1	1/1	0	0	0	0
Total	3	3/19	0	0	0	0

==== Trampoline ====
Games	Gymnasts	Events	Gold	Silver	Bronze	Total
Total	0	0/4	0	0	0	0

=== Judo ===
Games	No. judokas	Events	Gold	Silver	Bronze	Total	Ranking
1964 Tokyo	0	0/4	0	0	0	0	
1968 Mexico City	Not Scheduled						
1972 Munich	0	0/6	0	0	0	0	
1976 Montreal	2	2/6	0	0	0	0	
1980 Moscow	1	1/8	1	0	0	1	
1984 Los Angeles	3	3/8	0	0	0	0	
1988 Seoul	4	4/7	0	0	1	1	
1992 Barcelona	5	5/14	0	0	1	1	
1996 Atlanta	7	7/14	1	1	2	4	
2000 Sydney	9	9/14	0	0	2	2	
2004 Athens	3	3/14	0	0	1	1	
2008 Beijing	3	3/14	0	0	0	0	
2012 London	5	5/14	0	0	1	1	
2016 Rio	5	5/14	0	0	1	1	
2020 Tokyo	4	4/15	0	0	1	1	
2024 Paris	4	4/15	0	0	1	1	
Total			2	1	11	14	21

=== Rowing ===
Belgium competed at the first Olympic rowing regatta in 1900; the Royal Club Nautique de Gand men's eight took silver.

Games	No. Sailors	Events	Gold	Silver	Bronze	Total	Ranking
1896 Athens	Event wasn't held						
1900 Paris	12	2/5	0	1	0	1	6
1904 St Louis	0	0/5	0	0	0	0	
1908 London	10	2/5	0	1	0	1	2
1912 Stockholm	6	2/4	0	1	0	1	4=
1916	Games Cancelled						
1920 Antwerp	20	5/5	0	0	0	0	
1924 Paris	21	4/7	0	0	0	0	
1928 Amsterdam	22	6/7	0	0	1	1	9=
1932 Los Angeles	0	0/7	0	0	0	0	
1936 Berlin	7	2/7	0	0	0	0	
1940	Games Cancelled						
1944	Games Cancelled						
1948 London	4	2/7	0	0	0	0	
1952 Helsinki	12	5/7	0	1	0	1	9=
1956 Melbourne	7	3/7	0	0	0	0	
1960 Rome	5	2/7	0	0	0	0	
1964 Tokyo	2	1/7	0	0	0	0	
1968 Mexico City	1	1/7	0	0	0	0	
1972 Munich	5	2/7	0	0	0	0	
1976 Montreal	7	3/14	0	0	0	0	
1980	0	0/14	0	0	0	0	
1984 Los Angeles	6	3/14	0	1	1	2	10=
1988	8	4/14	0	0	0	0	
1992 Barcelona	9	4/14	0	1	0	1	8=
1996 Atlanta	5	3/14	0	0	0	0	
2000 Sydney	4	1/14	0	0	0	0	
2004 Athens	3	2/14	0	0	0	0	
2008 Beijing	3	2/14	0	0	0	0	
2012 London	1	1/14	0	0	0	0	
2016 Rio	1	1/14	0	0	0	0	
2020 Tokyo	2	1/14	0	0	0	0	
2024 Paris	3	2/14	0	0	0	0	
Total	186	264	0	6	2	8	35

=== Sailing ===
Games	No. Sailors	Events	Gold	Silver	Bronze	Total	Ranking
1896 Athens	Scheduled but event wasn't held						
1900 Paris	0	0/13	0	0	0	0	
1916 St Louis	Not Scheduled						
1908 London	3	1/4	0	1	0	1	2
1912 Stockholm	0	0/4	0	0	0	0	
1916	Games Cancelled						
1920 Antwerp	14	4/14	1	1	1	3	5
1924 Paris	9	3/3	1	0	0	1	2
1928 Amsterdam	6	2/3	0	0	0	0	
1932 Los Angeles	0	0/4	0	0	0	0	
1936 Berlin	3	2/4	0	0	0	0	
1940	Games Cancelled						
1944	Games Cancelled						
1948 London	12	3/5	0	0	0	0	
1952 Helsinki	4	2/5	0	0	0	0	
1956 Melbourne	1	1/5	0	1	0	1	7=
1960 Rome	3	2/5	0	0	1	1	8=
1964 Tokyo	1	1/5	0	0	0	0	
1968 Mexico City	3	2/5	0	0	0	0	
1972 Munich	4	2/6	0	0	0	0	
1976 Montreal	3	2/6	0	0	0	0	
1980 Moscow	0	0/6	0	0	0	0	
1984 Los Angeles	1	1/7	0	0	0	0	
1988 Seoul	0	0/8	0	0	0	0	
1992 Barcelona	5	4/10	0	0	0	0	
1996 Atlanta	3	3/10	0	1	0	1	12=
2000 Sydney	4	4/11	0	0	0	0	
2004 Athens	4	4/11	0	0	0	0	
2008 Beijing	3	2/11	0	0	0	0	
2012 London	3	3/10	0	0	1	1	12=
2016 Rio	4	3/10	0	0	0	0	
2020 Tokyo	4	3/10	0	0	0	0	
2024 Paris	8	5/10	0	0	0	0	
Total		205	2	4	3	9	18

=== Shooting ===
Belgium debuted in shooting in 1900.

Games	Shooters	Events	Gold	Silver	Bronze	Total
1900 Paris	10	7/9	0	1	2	3
1908 London	10	4/15	1	2	0	3
1920 Antwerp	29	15/21	0	1	0	1
1924 Paris	14	8/10	0	0	0	0
1936 Berlin	3	3/3	0	0	0	0
1948 London	3	2/4	0	0	0	0
1952 Helsinki	4	3/7	0	0	0	0
1956 Melbourne	2	3/7	0	0	0	0
1960 Rome	3	3/6	0	0	0	0
1964 Tokyo	1	2/6	0	0	0	0
1968 Mexico City	3	4/7	0	0	0	0
1972 Munich	6	5/8	0	0	0	0
1976 Montreal	5	5/7	0	0	0	0
1980 Moscow	3	2/7	0	0	0	0
1984 Los Angeles	6	4/11	0	0	0	0
1988 Seoul	6	8/13	0	0	1	1
1992 Barcelona	4	4/13	0	0	0	0
1996 Atlanta	4	4/15	0	0	0	0
2000 Sydney	1	2/17	0	0	0	0
2004 Athens	1	1/17	0	0	0	0
2012 London	1	1/15	0	1	0	1
2016 Rio de Janeiro	1	1/15	0	0	0	0
2020 Tokyo	1	1/15	0	0	0	0
Total	121	92/298	1	5	3	9

=== Sport climbing ===
Games	No. Sport climbers	Events	Gold	Silver	Bronze	Total	Ranking
2024 Paris	1	1/4	0	0	0	0	
Total	1	1/6	0	0	0	0	

=== Taekwando ===
Games	No. Taekwondoin	Events	Gold	Silver	Bronze	Total	Ranking
2004 Athens	1	1/8	0	0	0	0	
2016 Rio	3	3/8	0	0	0	0	
2020 Tokyo	1	1/8	0	0	0	0	
2024 Paris	1	1/8	0	0	1	1	
Total	6	6/48	0	0	1	1	

=== Tennis ===
Games	Tenissers	Events	Gold	Silver	Bronze	Total
1920 Antwerp	16	5/5	0	0	0	0
1924 Paris	8	5/5	0	0	0	0
1996 Atlanta	3	2/4	0	0	0	0
2000 Sydney	3	2/4	0	0	1	1
2004 Athens	3	3/4	1	0	0	0
2008 Beijing	2	2/4	0	0	0	0
2012 London	5	2/5	0	0	0	0
2016 Rio de Janeiro	3	3/5	0	0	0	0
2020 Tokyo	4	3/5	0	0	0	0
2024 Paris	3	2/5	0	0	0	0
Total	50	29/76	1	0	1	2

=== Tug of War ===
Games	Teammembers	Events	Gold	Silver	Bronze	Total	Ranking
1920 Antwerp	8	1/1	0	0	1	1	
Total	8	1/5	0	0	1	1	

=== Weightlifting ===
Games	Weightlifters	Events	Gold	Silver	Bronze	Total
1920 Antwerp	7	4/5	1	1	1	3
1924 Paris	8	5/5	0	0	0	0
1928 Amsterdam	8	5/5	0	0	0	0
1948 London	3	3/6	0	0	0	0
1952 Helsinki	2	2/7	0	0	0	0
1956 Melbourne	1	1/7	0	0	0	0
1960 Rome	2	2/7	0	0	0	0
1964 Tokyo	1	1/7	0	0	0	0
1968 Mexico City	2	2/7	0	1	0	1
1972 München	1	1/9	0	0	0	0
1976 Montreal	1	1/9	0	0	0	0
1980 Montreal	1	1/10	0	0	0	0
2000 Sydney	2	2/15	0	0	0	0
2008 Beijing	1	1/15	0	0	0	0
2012 London	1	1/15	0	0	0	0
2016 Rio de Janeiro	1	1/15	0	0	0	0
2020 Tokyo	2	2/14	0	0	0	0
2024 Paris	1	1/10	0	0	0	0
Total	45	36/237	1	2	1	4

=== Wrestling ===
Games	Wrestlers	Events	Gold	Silver	Bronze	Total
1908 London	4	2/9	0	0	0	0
1912 Stockholm	1	1/5	0	0	0	0
1920 Antwerp	12	8/10	0	0	0	0
1924 Paris	17	12/13	0	1	0	1
1928 Amsterdam	13	13/13	0	1	0	1
1936 Berlin	11	11/14	0	0	0	0
1948 London	9	9/16	0	0	0	0
1952 Helsinki	8	8/16	0	0	0	0
1956 Melbourne	3	3/16	0	1	0	1
1960 Rome	5	5/16	0	0	0	0
1964 Tokyo	3	3/16	0	0	0	0
1968 Mexico City	2	2/16	0	0	0	0
1972 München	2	2/20	0	0	0	0
1976 Montreal	2	2/20	0	0	0	0
1988 Seoul	1	1/20	0	0	0	0
1992 Barcelona	1	1/20	0	0	0	0
1996 Atlanta	1	1/20	0	0	0	0
Total	95	84/446	0	3	0	3

== See also ==
- List of flag bearers for Belgium at the Olympics
- Category:Olympic competitors for Belgium
- Belgium at the Paralympics
