= Archery at the 1920 Summer Olympics – Team moving bird, 28 metres =

Archery at the Olympics

Men's team moving bird at 28 metres at the Games of the VII Olympiad
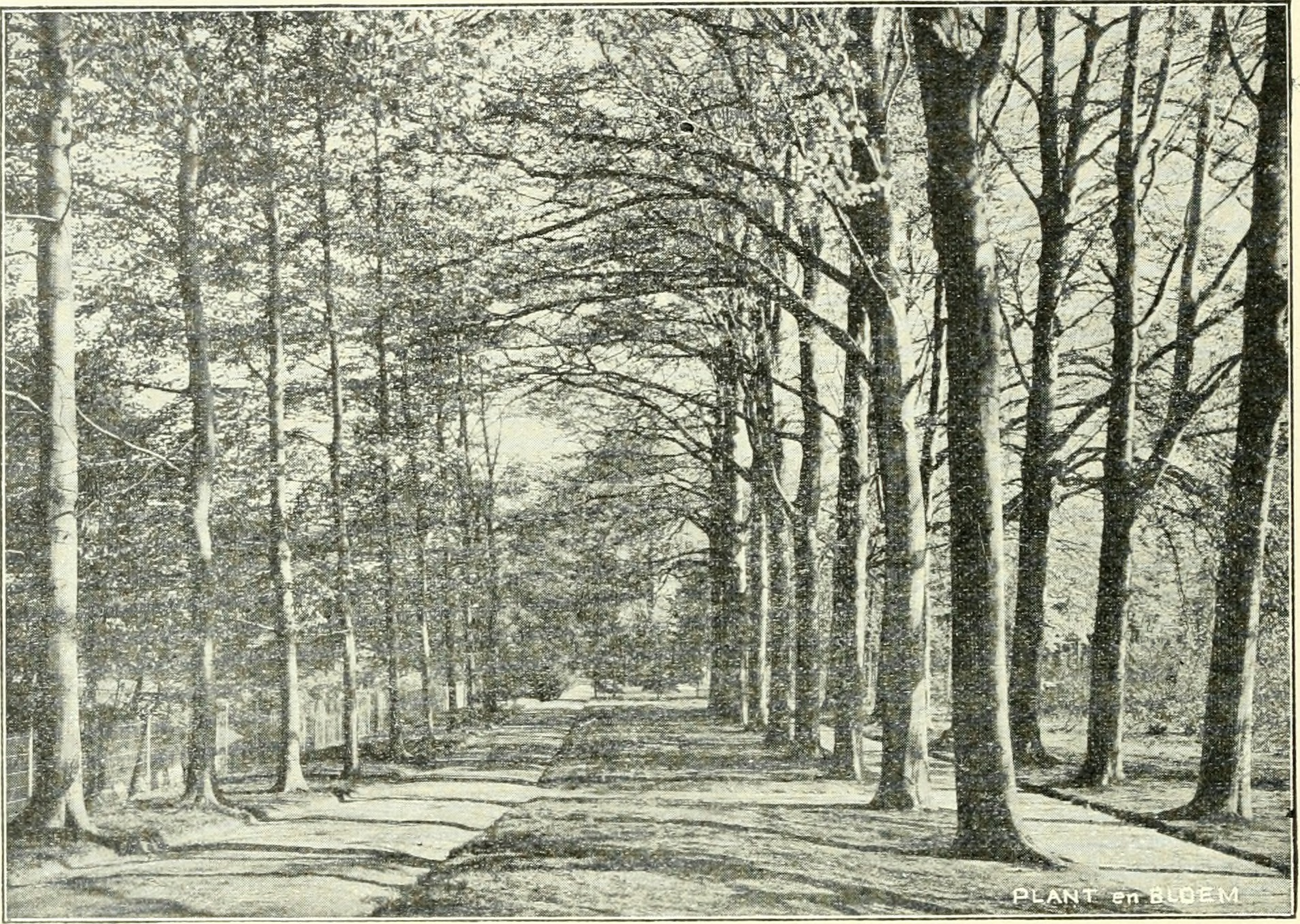
- Contemporary photograph of Nachtegalen Park, where the event took place
- Venue: Nachtegalen Park
- Dates: 4–5 August
- Competitors: 24 from 3 nations

Medalists
1st place, gold medalist(s)		Janus Theeuwes, Driekske van Bussel, Joep Packbiers, Janus van Merrienboer, Jo van Gastel, Theo Willems, Piet de Brouwer, Tiest van Gestel; Netherlands
2nd place, silver medalist(s)		Alphonse Allaert, Hubert Van Innis, Edmond De Knibber, Louis Delcon, Jérome De Maeyer, Pierre Van Thielt, Louis Fierens, Louis Van Beeck; Belgium
3rd place, bronze medalist(s)		Julien Brulé, Léonce Quentin, Pascal Fauvel, Eugène Grisot, Eugène Richez, Artur Mabellon, Léon Epin, Paul Leroy; France

The team moving bird at 28 metres event was part of the archery programme at the 1920 Summer Olympics. The event, like all other archery events in 1920, was open only to men. Three teams of eight archers each competed. Every archer had 60 shots, and every shot could earn a maximum of 9 points.

== Teams ==
Netherlands	Belgium	France
Janus Theeuwes; Driekske van Bussel; Joep Packbiers; Janus van Merrienboer; Jo van Gastel; Theo Willems; Piet de Brouwer; Tiest van Gestel	Alphonse Allaert; Hubert Van Innis; Edmond De Knibber; Louis Delcon; Jérome De Maeyer; Pierre Van Thielt; Louis Fierens; Louis Van Beeck	Julien Brulé; Léonce Quentin; Pascal Fauvel; Eugène Grisot; Eugène Richez; Arthur Mabillon; Léon Epin; Paul Leroy

== Results ==
Place	Team	Scores								
Place	Team	1	2	3	4	5	6	7	8	Total
1st place, gold medalist(s)	Netherlands	443	414	394	388	378	374	364	332	3087
2nd place, silver medalist(s)	Belgium	?								2924
3rd place, bronze medalist(s)	France	?								2328

== Sources ==
- Belgium Olympic Committee (1957). Olympic Games Antwerp 1920: Official Report (in French).
- Wudarski, Pawel (1999). "Wyniki Igrzysk Olimpijskich" (in Polish).
