= Archery at the 1920 Summer Olympics – Team moving bird, 50 metres =

Archery at the Olympics

Men's team moving bird at 50 metres at the Games of the VII Olympiad
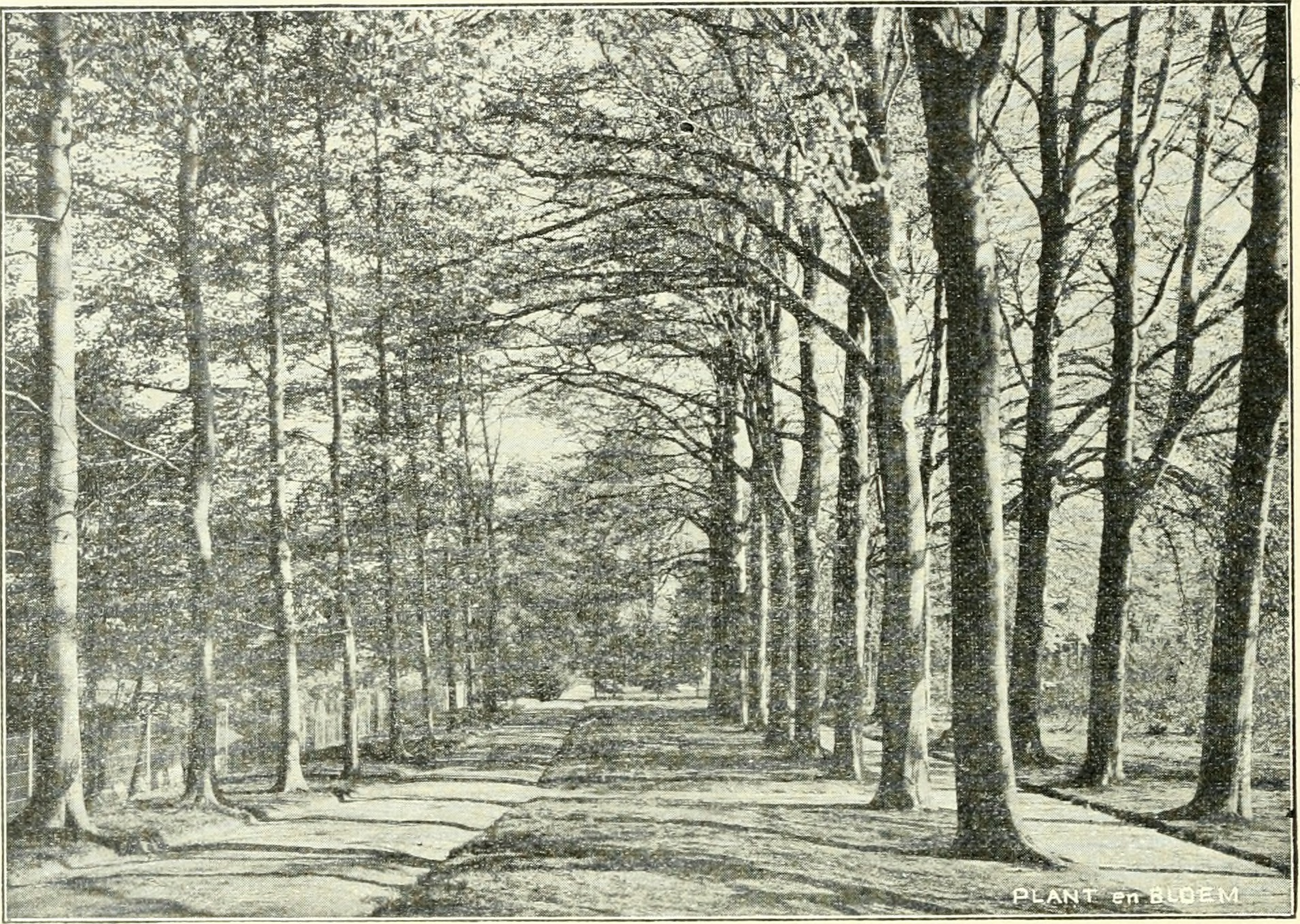
- Contemporary photograph of Nachtegalen Park, where the event took place
- Venue: Nachtegalen Park
- Dates: 4–5 August
- Competitors: 16 from 2 nations

Medalists
1st place, gold medalist(s)		Alphonse Allaert, Hubert Van Innis, Edmond De Knibber, Louis Delcon, Jérome De Maeyer, Pierre Van Thielt, Louis Fierens, Louis Van Beeck; Belgium
2nd place, silver medalist(s)		Julien Brulé, Léonce Quentin, Pascal Fauvel, Eugène Grisot, Eugène Richez, Artur Mabellon, Léon Epin, Paul Leroy; France

The team moving bird at 50 metres event was part of the archery programme at the 1920 Summer Olympics. The event, like all other archery events in 1920, was open only to men. Two teams of eight archers each competed.

== Results ==
Place	Team	Scores								
Place	Team	1	2	3	4	5	6	7	8	Total
1st place, gold medalist(s)	Belgium	404	368	362	361	350	?			2701
2nd place, silver medalist(s)	France	380	365	350	311	?				2493
