= Johannes van Gastel =

Dutch archer (1853–1928)

Johannes van Gastel (10 September 1853 –11 October 1928) was an archer from the Netherlands. He was born in Roosendaal and died in Tilburg.

van Gastel represented his native country at the 1900 Summer Olympics.

He is the father of Jo van Gastel, who competed in the 1920 Summer Olympics, also as an archer.
