= Paul Leroy (disambiguation) =

Paul Leroy (1860–1942) was a French painter.

Paul Leroy may also refer to:

- Paul Leroy (archer), French archer
- Paul Leroy (fencer), French fencer
- Paul LeRoy, the Peter Kay character
