= Archery at the 1920 Summer Olympics =

Archery at the Games of the VII Olympiad
- Venue: Nachtegalen Park
- Dates: 3–5 August 1920
- No. of events: 10 (10 men, 0 women)
- Competitors: 30 from 3 nations

Archery at the 1920 Summer Olympics in Antwerp marked the return of the sport after a 12-year absence following it not being contested in the 1912 Summer Olympics and the cancellation of the 1916 Summer Olympics due to World War I. The only competitors were men, and from only three countries. Belgium sent 14 archers, while France and the Netherlands each sent 8.

== Medal summary ==
| Event | Gold | Silver | Bronze |
|---|---|---|---|
| Individual fixed large bird | Edmond Cloetens; Belgium | Louis Van de Perck; Belgium | Firmin Flamand; Belgium |
| Team fixed large bird | Belgium; Edmond Cloetens; Louis Van de Perck; Firmin Flamand; Edmond Van Moer; Joseph Hermans; Auguste Van de Verre | No further competitors | No further competitors |
| Individual fixed small bird | Edmond Van Moer; Belgium | Louis Van de Perck; Belgium | Joseph Hermans; Belgium |
| Team fixed small bird | Belgium; Edmond Cloetens; Louis Van de Perck; Firmin Flamand; Edmond Van Moer; Joseph Hermans; Auguste Van de Verre | No further competitors | No further competitors |
| Individual moving bird, 50 metres | Julien Brulé; France | Hubert Van Innis; Belgium | No further competitors |
| Team moving bird, 50 metres | Belgium; Alphonse Allaert; Hubert Van Innis; Edmond De Knibber; Louis Delcon; Jérome De Maeyer; Pierre Van Thielt; Louis Fierens; Louis Van Beeck | France; Julien Brulé; Léonce Quentin; Pascal Fauvel; Eugène Grisot; Eugène Richez; Arthur Mabellon; Léon Epin; Paul Leroy | No further competitors |
| Individual moving bird, 33 metres | Hubert Van Innis; Belgium | Julien Brulé; France | No further competitors |
| Team moving bird, 33 metres | Belgium; Alphonse Allaert; Hubert Van Innis; Edmond De Knibber; Louis Delcon; Jérome De Maeyer; Pierre Van Thielt; Louis Fierens; Louis Van Beeck | France; Julien Brulé; Léonce Quentin; Pascal Fauvel; Eugène Grisot; Eugène Richez; Arthur Mabellon; Léon Epin; Paul Leroy | No further competitors |
| Individual moving bird, 28 metres | Hubert Van Innis; Belgium | Léonce Quentin; France | No further competitors |
| Team moving bird, 28 metres | Netherlands; Janus Theeuwes; Driekske van Bussel; Joep Packbiers; Janus van Merrienboer; Jo van Gastel; Theo Willems; Piet de Brouwer; Tiest van Gestel | Belgium; Hubert Van Innis; Alphonse Allaert; Edmond De Knibber; Louis Delcon; Jérome De Maeyer; Pierre Van Thielt; Louis Fierens; Louis Van Beeck | France; Julien Brulé; Léonce Quentin; Pascal Fauvel; Eugène Grisot; Eugène Richez; Arthur Mabellon; Léon Epin; Paul Leroy |

== Participating nations ==
A total of 30 archers from 3 nations competed at the Antwerp Games:

- Belgium (14)
- France (8)
- Netherlands (8)

== Medal table ==
| Rank | Nation | Gold | Silver | Bronze | Total |
|---|---|---|---|---|---|
| 1 | Belgium | 8 | 4 | 2 | 14 |
| 2 | France | 1 | 4 | 1 | 6 |
| 3 | Netherlands | 1 | 0 | 0 | 1 |
| Totals (3 entries) | | 10 | 8 | 3 | 21 |

== Sources ==
- Belgium Olympic Committee (1957). Olympic Games Antwerp 1920: Official Report (in French).
- International Olympic Committee medal database
