= François Dogaer =

Belgian footballer

Personal information
- Date of birth: 6 July 1897
- Date of death: 5 July 1926 (aged 28)

International career
Years	Team	Apps	(Gls)
- Belgium

François Dogaer (6 July 1897 – 5 July 1926) was a Belgian footballer. He played in three matches for the Belgium national football team in 1921.
