= Tiest van Gestel =

Dutch archer (1881–1969)

Medal record

Men's archery

Representing the Netherlands

Olympic Games
Gold medal – first place	1920 Antwerp	Team competition 28 m

Jan Baptist Jozef "Tiest" van Gestel (29 March 1881 – 9 February 1969) was an archer from the Netherlands. He was born in Goirle and died in Goirle.

He represented his native country at the 1920 Summer Olympics in Antwerp, Belgium. There he won the gold medal in the Men's Team Event (28 m), alongside Joep Packbiers, Piet de Brouwer, Driekske van Bussel, Janus van Merrienboer, Jo van Gastel, Janus Theeuwes, and Theo Willems.
