= Driekske van Bussel =

Dutch archer (1868–1951)

Medal record

Men's archery

Representing the Netherlands

Olympic Games
Gold medal – first place	1920 Antwerp	Team competition 28 m

Hendrikus "Driekske" van Bussel (18 November 1868 – 27 April 1951) was an archer from the Netherlands. He was born in Asten, North Brabant and died in Helmond, North Brabant.

He represented his native country at the 1920 Summer Olympics in Antwerp, Belgium. There he won the gold medal in the Men's Team Event (28 m), alongside Joep Packbiers, Janus Theeuwes, Theo Willems, Jo van Gastel, Tiest van Gestel, Janus van Merrienboer, and Piet de Brouwer.
