= Léon Vandermeiren =

Belgian footballer (1896–1955)

Personal information
- Date of birth: 8 January 1896
- Place of birth: Brussels, Belgium
- Date of death: 3 May 1955 (aged 59)
- Place of death: Brussels, Belgium
- Position: Goalkeeper

Senior career*
| Years | Team | Apps | (Gls) |
| 1919–1928 | Daring Club Bruxelles | | |

International career
| 1920-1925 | Belgium | 2 | (0) |
| 1920 | Belgium XI | 1 | (0) |
Medal record
Men's football
Representing Belgium
Olympic Games
| Gold medal – first place | 1920 Antwerp | Team |
- * Club domestic league appearances and goals

Léon Vandermeiren (8 January 1896 – 3 May 1955) was a Belgian footballer who played as a goalkeeper. Born in Brussels, he was part of the Belgian Olympic Games' winning squad in 1920.

Vandermeiren played his entire career for Daring Club Bruxelles, winning the 1921 league title with them.

He played in two official matches and an unofficial one for the Belgium national football team in 1920 and 1925.
