= Atlantic Wall & Air War Bunker Museum Antwerp =

Military war museum in Park den Brandt, Wilrijk (Antwerp) in Belgium

The Atlantic Wall & Air War Bunker Museum Antwerp is a military war museum in Park den Brandt, Wilrijk (now Antwerp), Belgium which preserves fortifications of the Atlantic Wall from the Second World War. The Bunker Village was built in 1943 and is made of up eight bunkers, three of which are accessible to the public. Two bunkers have been repurposed to be the Museum.

The Command Bunker (Führungsbunker) in 2011.

== The Bunkers ==
- 2x Bunker SK1
- 5x Troopsbunker, Type VF52A
- 1x Hospitalbunker, Type VF57A

One of each bunker is open to the public.

== War Museum ==
The museum of the bunker village is located in the Sonderkonstruktion 1 (SK1) bunker and the main command bunker of the Village. The museum has numerous archaeological pieces on display from several fortifications, relating to the Atlantic Wall, aerial warfare, and Antwerp itself during the war. The museum also features a restored engine room, which is functional, as well as preserved German "vengeance weapons"—the V1 flying bomb and the V2 ballistic missile.

== History of the Bunker Village ==
In 1942, houses around the area were requisitioned to host the military personnel of the headquarters of the German 89th Army Corps, led by General Werner Freiherr von und zu Gilsa and his staff. In October 1942, the rest of the Belgian coast would later also be added to the same sector (Küstenverteidigungsabschnitt or KVA) as part of the Altantikwall, with the Antwerp bunker being the command center. This was divided into 3 KVAs, to which a 4th was added until 1944 to defend Antwerp and its port itself. The bunkers were finally built in 1943. Werner von Gilsa, General der Panzertruppen Alfred Ritter von Hubicki, and even Generalfeldmarschall Rommel spent time visiting the Bunkers.

On 29 August 1944, a few days before the liberation of Antwerp, the bunkers were abandoned by General von Gilsa and his staff. After the war, in July 1947, all the furniture and equipment both inside and outside the bunkers were sold through auction. Plans were drawn up to demolish the bunkers soon thereafter, but were called off in March 1948. The command bunkers were controlled by the Belgian Civil Protection. Eventually, the bunker village was made public and recognized as a monument on 11 June 2004.

== Bibliography ==
- Frank Philippart, Dirk Peeters and Alain van Geeteruyen. De Atlantikwall (Lanoo, 2004),
