= Janus van Merrienboer =

Dutch archer (1894–1947)

Medal record

Men's archery

Representing the Netherlands

Olympic Games
Gold medal – first place	1920 Antwerp	Team competition 28 m

Adrianus "Janus" van Merrienboer (8 October 1894 – 12 October 1947) was an archer from the Netherlands. He was born and died in Oud en Nieuw Gastel, North Brabant.

He represented his native country at the 1920 Summer Olympics in Antwerp, Belgium. There he won the gold medal in the Men's Team Event (28 m), alongside Joep Packbiers, Piet de Brouwer, Driekske van Bussel, Jo van Gastel, Tiest van Gestel, Janus Theeuwes, and Theo Willems.
