= Joep Packbiers =

Dutch archer (1875–1957)

- Packbiers and the rest of the Dutch archery team at the 1920 Summer Olympics

Personal information
- Full name: Jan Joseph Packbiers
- Nationality: Dutch
- Born: 19 January 1875 Nuth, Limburg, Netherlands
- Died: 8 December 1957 (aged 82) Maastricht, Limburg, Netherlands

Sport
- Sport: Archery
Medal record
Men's archery
Representing the Netherlands
Olympic Games
Gold medal – first place	1920 Antwerp	Team competition 28 m

Jan Joseph "Joep" Packbiers (19 January 1875 – 8 December 1957) was an archer from the Netherlands. He was born in Nuth, Limburg and died in Maastricht, Limburg.

He represented his native country at the 1920 Summer Olympics in Antwerp, Belgium. There he won the gold medal in the Men's Team Event (28 m), alongside Piet de Brouwer, Janus Theeuwes, Driekske van Bussel, Jo van Gastel, Tiest van Gestel, Janus van Merrienboer, and Theo Willems.
