= Janus Theeuwes =

Dutch archer (1886–1975)

Medal record

Men's archery

Representing the Netherlands

Olympic Games
Gold medal – first place	1920 Antwerp	Team competition 28 m

Adrianus "Janus" Cornelis Theeuwes (4 April 1886 – 7 August 1975) was an archer from the Netherlands. He owned a leather factory (Theeuwes Van de Maade) and was father of seven daughters and one son. His son, Huub, succeeded him. He was born in Gilze en Rijen and died in Tilburg.

He represented his native country at the 1920 Summer Olympics in Antwerp, Belgium. There he won the gold medal in the Men's Team Event (28 m), alongside Joep Packbiers, Piet de Brouwer, Driekske van Bussel, Jo van Gastel, Tiest van Gestel, Janus van Merrienboer, and Theo Willems.
