= Theo Willems =

Dutch archer (1891–1960)

Medal record

Men's archery

Representing the Netherlands

Olympic Games
Gold medal – first place	1920 Antwerp	Team competition 28 m

Theodorus "Theo" Willems (22 February 1891 – 12 April 1960) was an archer from the Netherlands. He was born in Uden, North Brabant and died in Bakel, North Brabant.

He represented his native country at the 1920 Summer Olympics in Antwerp, Belgium. There he won the gold medal in the Men's Team Event (28 m), alongside Joep Packbiers, Janus Theeuwes, Driekske van Bussel, Jo van Gastel, Tiest van Gestel, Janus van Merrienboer, and Piet de Brouwer.
