= Jo van Gastel =

Dutch archer (1887–1969)

Medal record

Men's archery

Representing the Netherlands

Olympic Games
Gold medal – first place	1920 Antwerp	Team competition 28 m

Johannes Jacobus van Gastel (5 January 1887 – 5 March 1969) was an archer from the Netherlands. He was born and died in Tilburg.

He represented his native country at the 1920 Summer Olympics in Antwerp, Belgium. There he won the gold medal in the Men's Team Event (28 m), alongside Joep Packbiers, Piet de Brouwer, Driekske van Bussel, Janus van Merrienboer, Tiest van Gestel, Janus Theeuwes, and Theo Willems.

He is the son of Johannes van Gastel, who competed in the 1900 Summer Olympics, also as an archer.
