= Julien Cnudde =

Belgian footballer

Personal information
- Date of birth: 22 May 1897

International career
Years	Team	Apps	(Gls)
- Belgium

Julien Cnudde (born 22 May 1897, date of death unknown) was a Belgian footballer. He played in one match for the Belgium national football team in 1924.
