= Léopold De Groof =

Belgian footballer (1896-1984)

Personal information
- Date of birth: 2 February 1896
- Place of birth: Lille, France
- Date of death: 26 June 1984 (aged 88)

International career
Years	Team	Apps	(Gls)
- Belgium

Léopold De Groof (2 February 1896 – 26 June 1984) was a Belgian footballer. He played in two matches for the Belgium national football team in 1921.
