= Jérôme de Mayer =

Belgian archer (1875–1958)

Personal information
- Born: 21 July 1875
- Died: 18 August 1958 (aged 83)

Sport
- Country: Belgium
- Sport: Archery
Medal record
Olympic Games
Gold medal – first place	1920 Antwerp	Moving Bird 33 m Team
Gold medal – first place	1920 Antwerp	Moving Bird 50 m Team
Silver medal – second place	1920 Antwerp	Moving Bird 28 m Team

Jérôme de Mayer (21 July 1875 – 18 August 1958) was a Belgian archer who competed in the 1920 Summer Olympics. He won two gold and one silver medal as a member of the Belgian team in three different team events.

He was father-in-law of World Archery president Oscar Kessels.
