= Pierre Van Thielt =

Belgian archer

Personal information
- Nationality: Belgian

Sport
- Country: Belgium
- Sport: Archery
Medal record
Olympic Games
Gold medal – first place	1920 Antwerp	Moving Bird 33 m Team
Gold medal – first place	1920 Antwerp	Moving Bird 50 m Team
Silver medal – second place	1920 Antwerp	Moving Bird 28 m Team

Pierre Van Thielt was a Belgian archer. He competed at the 1920 Summer Olympics, winning three medals, two gold and a silver.
