= Louis Van de Perck =

Belgian archer (1889–1953)

Medal record

Representing Belgium

Men's archery

Olympic Games
| Gold medal – first place | 1920 Antwerp | Fixed bird target (team) |
| Silver medal – second place | 1920 Antwerp | Fixed target (small birds) |
| Silver medal – second place | 1920 Antwerp | Fixed target (large birds) |

Louis Van de Perck (14 October 1889 – 30 November 1953) was a Belgian archer and Olympic champion. He competed at the 1920 Summer Olympics in Antwerp, where he won a gold medal with the Belgian team, and also two individual silver medals.
