= Nachtegalen Park =

Park located in Antwerp, Belgium

Coordinates: 51°11′02″N 4°24′28″E

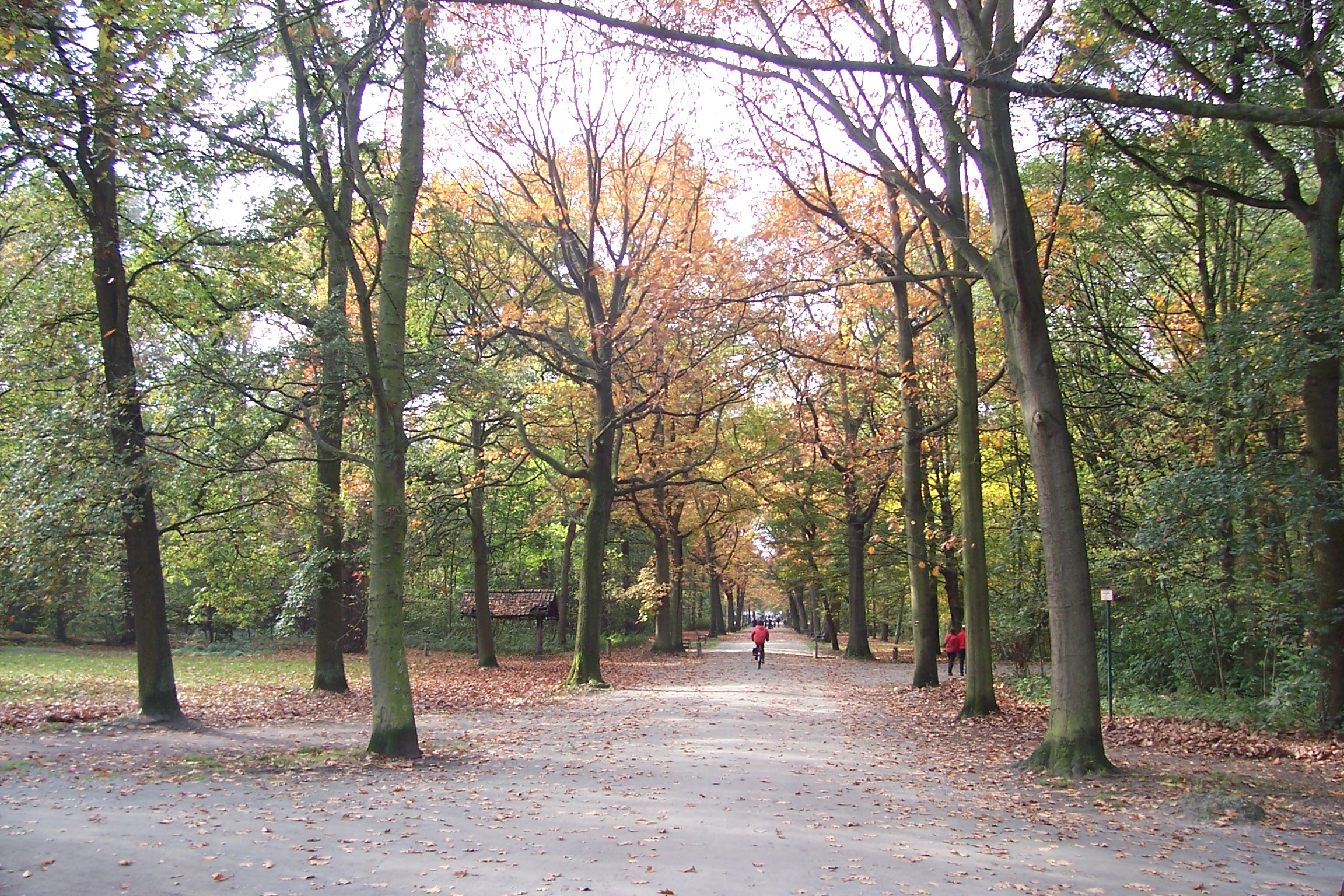
Nachtegalen Park

Nachtegalen Park (Dutch: Nightingale Park) is a park located in the Antwerp, Belgium municipality of Wilrijk. It served as the archery venue for the 1920 Summer Olympics.

During World War II, the park was headquarters for the 89th German Army Corps, then it became command post of the 719th Infantry Division.

The park is home to the Atlantic Wall & Air War Bunker Museum.
