= Eugène Grisot =

French archer (1866–1936)

Olympic medal record

Men's archery

Representing France
Gold medal – first place	1908 London	Continental style
Silver medal – second place	1920 Antwerp	Moving bird 50 m, team
Silver medal – second place	1920 Antwerp	Moving bird 33 m, team
Bronze medal – third place	1920 Antwerp	Moving bird 28 m, team

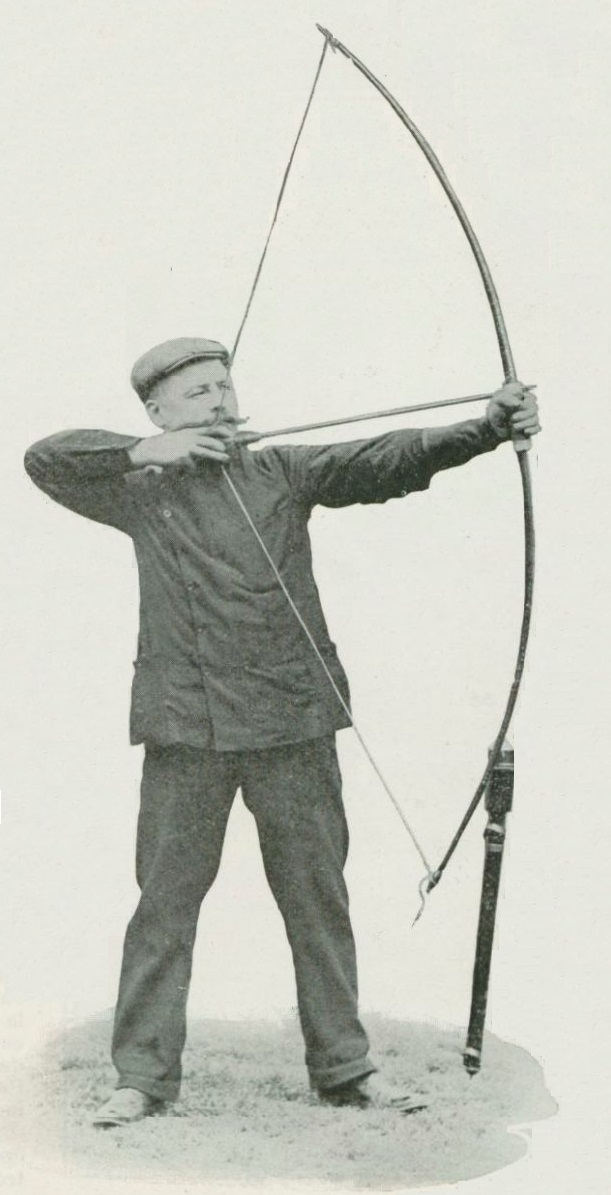

Eugène G. Grisot (French: [øʒɛn ɡʁizo]; 19 December 1866 – 2 May 1936) was a French archer. He won a gold medal at the 1908 Summer Olympics in London. Grisot entered the men's double York round event in 1908, taking 19th place with 410 points.

In the Continental style event, he had considerably more success, scoring 263 points over 40 arrows to take 1st place in the event. Twelve years later, he was able to win three more medals at the 1920 Summer Olympics in Antwerp.

== Sources ==
- Cook, Theodore Andrea (1908). The Fourth Olympiad, Being the Official Report. London: British Olympic Association.
- De Wael, Herman (2001). "Archery 1908". Herman's Full Olympians. Archived from the original on 29 September 2006.
