= Alphonse Allaert =

Belgian archer

Personal information
- Full name: Alphonsius Gustaaf Allaert
- Born: 27 October 1872 Sint-Michiels, Belgium

Sport
- Country: Belgium
- Sport: Archery
Medal record
Olympic Games
| Gold medal – first place | 1920 Antwerp | Moving Bird 33 m Team |
| Gold medal – first place | 1920 Antwerp | Moving Bird 50 m Team |
| Silver medal – second place | 1920 Antwerp | Moving Bird 28 m Team |

Alphonse Allaert (born 27 October 1872, date of death unknown) was a Belgian archer. He competed at the 1920 Summer Olympics, winning three medals, two gold and a silver.
