= Louis Fierens =

Belgian archer (1875–1967)

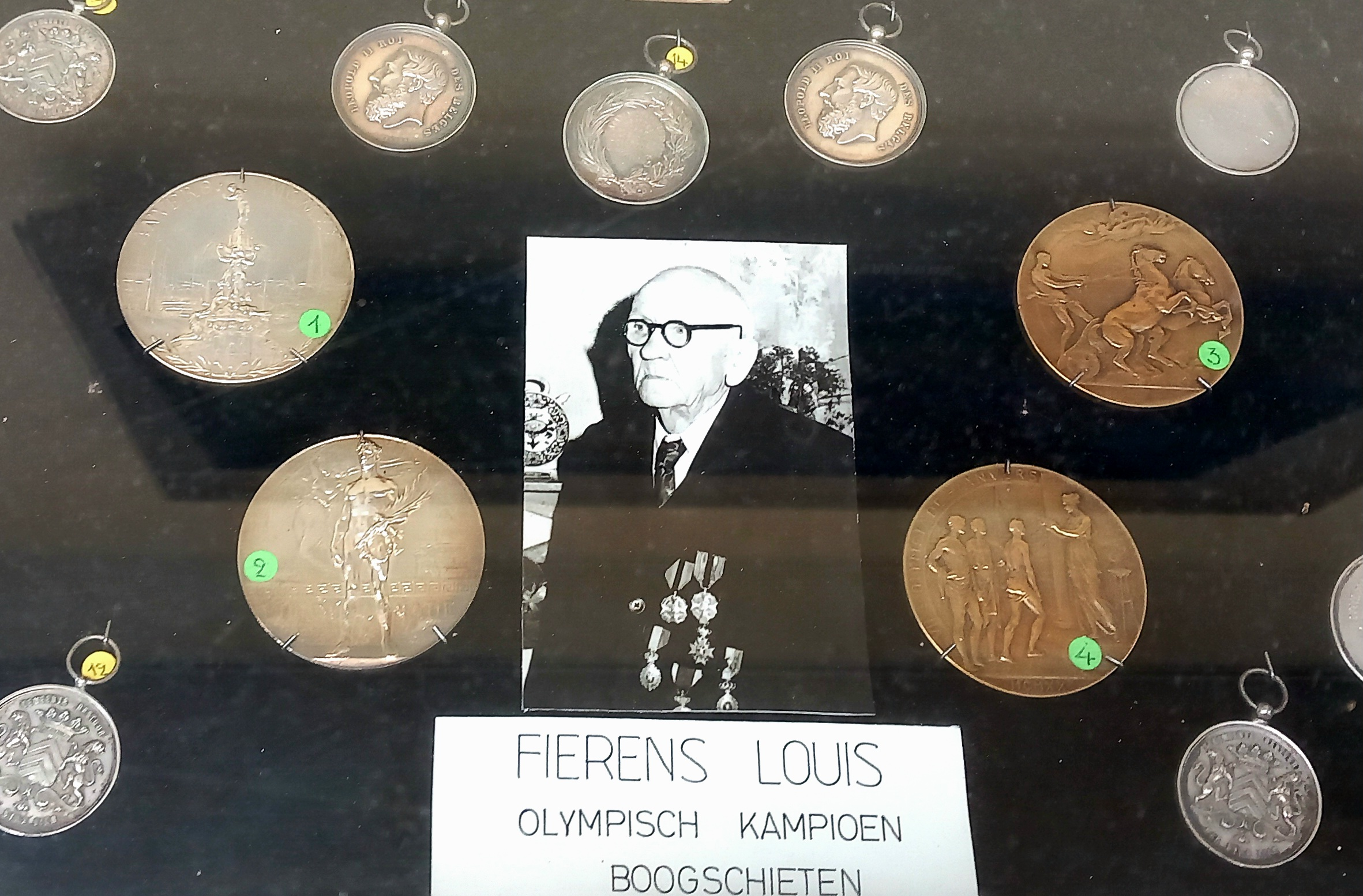

Personal information
- Born: 14 October 1875 Duffel, Belgium
- Died: 1967 (aged 91–92)

Sport
- Country: Belgium
- Sport: Archery
Medal record
Olympic Games
Gold medal – first place	1920 Antwerp	Moving Bird 33 m Team
Gold medal – first place	1920 Antwerp	Moving Bird 50 m Team
Silver medal – second place	1920 Antwerp	Moving Bird 28 m Team

Louis Fierens (14 October 1875 – 1967) was a Belgian archer. He competed at the 1920 Summer Olympics, winning three medals, two gold and a silver.
