= Edmond Cloetens =

Belgian archer

Medal record

Representing Belgium

Men's archery

Olympic Games
Gold medal – first place	1920 Antwerp	Fixed large bird
Gold medal – first place	1920 Antwerp	Fixed large bird (team)
Gold medal – first place	1920 Antwerp	Fixed small bird (team)

Edmond Cloetens was a Belgian archer and Olympic champion. He competed at the 1920 Summer Olympics in Antwerp, where he won an individual gold medal in fixed target (large birds), and also two gold medals with the Belgian team.

== Note ==
Some sources list his name as Emile Cloetens, while most sources have Edmond Cloetens.
