= Julien Brulé =

French archer

Olympic medal record

Men's archery

Representing France
Gold medal – first place	1920 Antwerp	Moving bird 50 m
Silver medal – second place	1920 Antwerp	Moving bird 33 m
Silver medal – second place	1920 Antwerp	Team competition 33 m
Silver medal – second place	1920 Antwerp	Team competition 50 m
Bronze medal – third place	1920 Antwerp	Team competition 28 m

Julien Louis Brulé (30 April 1875 – after 1920) was a French archer who competed in the 1920 Summer Olympics. In 1920 he won five Olympic medals, gold and silver in individual events and two silver and one bronze in team competitions.
