= Léonce Quentin =

French archer (1880–1957)

Olympic medal record

Men's Archery
Silver medal – second place	1920 Antwerp	moving bird 28 m
Silver medal – second place	1920 Antwerp	Team Competition 33 m
Silver medal – second place	1920 Antwerp	Team Competition 50 m
Bronze medal – third place	1920 Antwerp	Team Competition 28 m

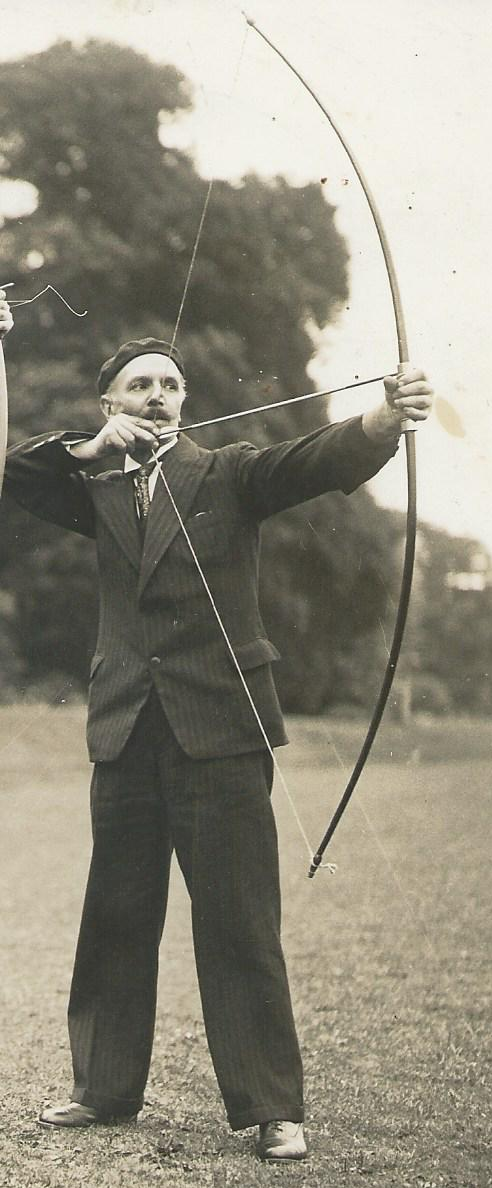
Léonce Quentin

Léonce Gaston Quentin (16 February 1880 – 1 December 1957) was a French archer who competed in the 1920 Summer Olympics. In 1920, he won four Olympic medals, one silver in the individual moving bird 28 metres event and two silver and one bronze in team competitions.
