= Edmond Van Moer =

Belgian archer

Medal record

Representing Belgium

Men's archery

Olympic Games
Gold medal – first place	1920 Antwerp	Fixed small bird
Gold medal – first place	1920 Antwerp	Fixed large bird (team)
Gold medal – first place	1920 Antwerp	Fixed small bird (team)

Edmond Van Moer (born 21 July 1875) was a Belgian archer and Olympic champion. He competed at the 1920 Summer Olympics in Antwerp, where he won an individual gold medal in fixed target (small birds), and also two gold medals with the Belgian team.
