= Pascal Fauvel =

French archer (1882–1942)

Olympic medal record

Men's Archery
Silver medal – second place	1920 Antwerp	Team Competition 33 m
Silver medal – second place	1920 Antwerp	Team Competition 50 m
Bronze medal – third place	1920 Antwerp	Team Competition 28 m

Pascal Fauvel (8 April 1882 – 22 October 1942) was a French archer who competed in the 1920 Summer Olympics. In 1920 he won three Olympic medals, two silver and one bronze in team competitions.
