= Eugène Richez =

French archer (1864–1944)

Olympic medal record

Men's Archery
Silver medal – second place	1920 Antwerp	Moving bird 50m, team
Silver medal – second place	1920 Antwerp	Moving bird 33m, team
Bronze medal – third place	1920 Antwerp	Moving bird 28m, team

Eugène Richez (5 August 1864 – 31 October 1944) was a French archer who competed at the 1908 Summer Olympics in London and at the 1920 Summer Olympics in Antwerp.

Richez entered the men's double York round event in 1908, taking 17th place with 418 points. He then competed in the Continental style contest, placing 9th at 210 points. Twelve years later, he won two silver medals and one bronze medal.
