= Léon Epin =

French archer (1858–1928)

Personal information
- Nationality: French
- Born: 30 October 1858 Ceintrey, France
- Died: 3 July 1928 (aged 69) Montfermeil, France

Sport
- Sport: Archery

Léon Epin (30 October 1858 – 3 July 1928) was a French archer. He competed at the 1920 Summer Olympics, winning three medals, two silver and a bronze.
