= Arthur Mabillon =

French archer (1888–1961)

Personal information
- Nationality: French
- Born: 13 October 1888; Claye-Souilly, France
- Died: 13 October 1961 (aged 73); Claye-Souilly, France

Sport
- Sport: Archery

Arthur Mabillon (13 October 1888 – 13 October 1961) was a French archer. He competed at the 1920 Summer Olympics, winning three medals, two silver and a bronze.
