= Paul Leroy (archer) =

French archer (1884–1949)

Personal information
- Nationality: French
- Born: 13 January 1884 Bellot, France
- Died: 9 April 1949 (aged 65) Melun, France

Sport
- Sport: Archery

Paul Leroy (13 January 1884 – 9 April 1949) was a French archer. He competed at the 1920 Summer Olympics, winning three medals, two silver and a bronze.
