= Denmark at the 1920 Summer Olympics =

- IOC code: DEN
- NOC: Danish Olympic Committee

in Antwerp
- Competitors: 154 (150 men and 4 women) in 14 sports
- Flag bearer: Robert Johnsen
- Medals Ranked 10th: Gold 3 Silver 9 Bronze 1 Total 13

Summer Olympics appearances (overview)
- 1896; 1900; 1904; 1908; 1912; 1920; 1924; 1928; 1932; 1936; 1948; 1952; 1956; 1960; 1964; 1968; 1972; 1976; 1980; 1984; 1988; 1992; 1996; 2000; 2004; 2008; 2012; 2016; 2020; 2024; 2028

Other related appearances
- 1906 Intercalated Games

Denmark competed at the 1920 Summer Olympics in Antwerp, Belgium. 154 competitors, 150 men and 4 women, took part in 66 events in 14 sports.

== Medalists ==
=== Gold ===
- Stefani Fryland Clausen — Diving, Women's 10m Platform
- Men's Team (Free system) — Gymnastics
- Lars Madsen, Niels Larsen, Anders Petersen, Erik Sætter-Lassen and Anders Peter Nielsen — Shooting, Men's Team 300m military rifle, standing

=== Silver ===
- Henry Petersen — Athletics, Pole vault
- Sören Petersen — Boxing, Heavyweight
- Anders Petersen — Boxing, Flyweight
- Gotfred Johansen — Boxing, Lightweight
- Men's Team (Swedish system) — Gymnastics
- Men's Team — Field Hockey
- Niels Larsen — Shooting, Men's 300m free rifle, 3 positions
- Lars Madsen — Shooting, Men's 300m military rifle, standing
- Poul Hansen — Wrestling, Greco-Roman heavyweight

=== Bronze ===
- Johannes Eriksen — Wrestling, Greco-Roman light heavyweight

== Athletics ==
18 athletes represented Denmark in 1920. It was the nation's fifth appearance in athletics, a sport in which Denmark had competed each time the country appeared at the Olympics. Henry Petersen took the country's only medal, a silver in the pole vault. This was Denmark's best ever result in athletics at the time, topping Ernst Schulz's bronze from 1900, and remains tied for best result through the 2008 Games.

Ranks given are within the heat.

Athlete	Event	Heats		Quarterfinals		Semifinals		Final	
Athlete	Event	Result	Rank	Result	Rank	Result	Rank	Result	Rank
Albert Andersen	10000 m	N/A				32:58.4	3 Q	did not finish	
Albert Andersen	Cross country	N/A						Unknown	20
Fritiof Andersen	100 m	Unknown	4	did not advance					
Julius Ebert	10000 m	N/A				did not finish		did not advance	
Julius Ebert	Cross country	N/A						Unknown	35
Rudolf Hansen	Marathon	N/A						2:41:39.4	8
Axel Jensen	Marathon	N/A						did not finish	
Jón Jónsen	5000 m	N/A				Unknown	7	did not advance	
Jón Jónsen	Cross country	N/A						Unknown	28
Artur Nielsen	5000 m	N/A				did not finish		did not advance	
Artur Nielsen	Cross country	N/A						did not finish	
Niels Pedersen	3 km walk	N/A				14:06.3	5 Q	13:36.8	11
Niels Pedersen	10 km walk	N/A				Disqualified		did not advance	
Gunnar Rasmussen	3 km walk	N/A				Disqualified		did not advance	
Gunnar Rasmussen	10 km walk	N/A				Disqualified		did not advance	
Sofus Rose	Marathon	N/A						2:41:18.0	5
August Sørensen	100 m	11.3	2 Q	Unknown	4	did not advance			
August Sørensen	200 m	23.8	2 Q	Unknown	4	did not advance			
Henrik Sørensen	Cross country	N/A						Unknown	27
Marinus Sørensen	100 m	11.2	2 Q	Unknown	4	did not advance			
Henri Thorsen	110 m hurdles	N/A		16.8	1 Q	Unknown	4	did not finish	
Fritiof Andersen; August Sørensen; Marinus Sørensen; Henri Thorsen	4 × 100 m relay	N/A				43.8	2 Q	43.3	5
Albert Andersen; Julius Ebert; Jón Jónsen; Artur Nielsen; Henrik Sørensen	Team cross country	N/A						53	7

Athlete	Event	Qualifying		Final	
Athlete	Event	Result	Rank	Result	Rank
Valther Jensen	Discus throw	38.23	7	did not advance	
Laurits Jørgensen	Pole vault	3.60	1 Q	3.60	6
Frederik Petersen	Shot put	12.525	11	did not advance	
Frederik Petersen	Javelin throw	42.13	19	did not advance	
Henry Petersen	Pole vault	3.60	1 Q	3.70	2nd place, silver medalist(s)

== Boxing ==
12 boxers represented Denmark at the 1920 Games. It was the nation's second appearance in boxing. Three boxers advanced to the finals in their weight classes, but none was able to win a gold medal. The three silvers were Denmark's first Olympic boxing medals, and placed the nation in sixth for the boxing medal count in 1920.

Boxer	Weight class	Round of 32	Round of 16	Quarterfinals	Semifinals	Final / Bronze match	
Boxer	Weight class	Opposition Score	Opposition Score	Opposition Score	Opposition Score	Opposition Score	Rank
Emil Andreasen	Light heavyweight	N/A	Bye	White (GBR); L	did not advance		5
Nick Clausen	Featherweight	Bye	Newton (CAN); W	Zivic (USA); L	did not advance		5
Einer Jensen	Flyweight	N/A	Cuthbertson (GBR); L	did not advance			9
Johan Jensen	Lightweight	N/A	Newton (CAN); L	did not advance			9
Gotfred Johansen	Lightweight	N/A	Neys (BEL); W	Cassidy (USA); W	Newton (CAN); W	Mosberg (USA); L	2nd place, silver medalist(s)
Georg Kruse	Middleweight	Bye	Rey-Golliet (FRA); L	did not advance			9
Hans Jacob Nielsen	Featherweight	Bye	Cater (GBR); L	did not advance			9
Martin Olsen	Middleweight	Bye	White (GBR); W	Strømme (NOR); L	did not advance		5
Anders Pedersen	Flyweight	N/A	van Dijk (NED); W	Zivic (USA); W	Cuthbertson (GBR); W	Genaro (USA); L	2nd place, silver medalist(s)
Søren Petersen	Heavyweight	N/A	Bye	Dove (GBR); W	Spengler (USA); W	Rawson (GBR); L	2nd place, silver medalist(s)
Ivan Schannong	Welterweight	Heuckelbach (NED); W	Colberg (USA); L	did not advance			9
August Suhr	Welterweight	Bye	Smet (BEL); W	Ireland (GBR); L	did not advance		5

Opponent nation	Wins	Losses	Percent
Belgium	2	0	1.000
Canada	2	1	.667
France	0	1	.000
Great Britain	3	5	.375
Netherlands	2	0	1.000
Norway	0	1	.000
United States	3	4	.429
Total	12	12	.500

Round	Wins	Losses	Percent
Round of 32	1	0	1.000
Round of 16	5	5	.500
Quarterfinals	3	4	.429
Semifinals	3	0	1.000
Final	0	3	.000
Bronze match	0	0	–
Total	12	12	.500

== Cycling ==
Six cyclists represented Denmark in 1920. It was the nation's second appearance in the sport. The road cycling team came in fourth in the team time trial, the closest the Danish cyclists had come to a medal in either Games to that point.

=== Road cycling ===
Cyclist	Event	Final	
Cyclist	Event	Result	Rank
Georg Claussen	Time trial	5:02:12.2	20
Kristian Frisch	Time trial	5:01:18.8	19
Johan Johansen	Time trial	4:52:00.2	11
Johan Lundgren	Time trial	4:58:01.0	17
Georg Claussen; Kristian Frisch; Johan Johansen; Johan Lundgren	Team time trial	19:52:32.2	4

=== Track cycling ===
Ranks given are within the heat.

Cyclist	Event	Heats		Quarterfinals		Repechage semis		Repechage final		Semifinals		Final	
Cyclist	Event	Result	Rank	Result	Rank	Result	Rank	Result	Rank	Result	Rank	Result	Rank
Henri Andersen	Sprint	13.6	1 Q	Unknown	2 R	Unknown	2	did not advance					
Axel Hansen	Sprint	Unknown	3	did not advance									
Henri Andersen; Axel Hansen	Tandem	N/A		Unknown	2	N/A				did not advance			

== Diving ==
Five divers, three men and two women, represented Denmark in 1920. It was the nation's debut appearance in the sport. Clausen took the nation's only diving medal of the Games, winning the gold in the women's 10 metre platform event.

Men

Ranks given are within the semifinal group.

Diver	Event	Semifinals			Final		
Diver	Event	Points	Score	Rank	Points	Score	Rank
Herold Jansson	Plain high dive	13	152.0	2 Q	27	159.0	6
Paul Køhler	10 m platform	23	387.40	5	did not advance		
Svend Sørensen	10 m platform	21	414.80	5	did not advance		
Svend Sørensen	Plain high dive	27	1370	5	did not advance		

Women

Ranks given are within the semifinal group.

Diver	Event	Semifinals			Final		
Diver	Event	Points	Score	Rank	Points	Score	Rank
Stefanie Clausen	10 m platform	15	153.0	3 Q	6	173.0	1st place, gold medalist(s)
Louise Petersen	10 m platform	34	130.0	8	did not advance		

== Fencing ==
Eight fencers represented Denmark in 1920. It was the nation's fifth appearance in the sport—the most of any nation in 1920. The country's best individual result was Osiier's eighth-place finish in the foil, with the best team finish also coming in the foil with a fourth-place showing.

Ranks given are within the group.

Fencer	Event	First round		Quarterfinals		Semifinals		Final	
Fencer	Event	Result	Rank	Result	Rank	Result	Rank	Result	Rank
Otto Bærentzen	Épée	4–4	5	did not advance					
Aage Berntsen	Épée	3–4	4 Q	4–7	10	did not advance			
Aage Berntsen	Foil	N/A		0–5	6	did not advance			
Aage Berntsen	Sabre	N/A		5–2	4 Q	0–6	7	did not advance	
Verner Bonde	Foil	N/A		0–4	5	did not advance			
Georg Hegner	Épée	1–7	8	did not advance					
Georg Hegner	Foil	N/A		4–4	4	did not advance			
Einar Levison	Épée	4–2	3 Q	4–4	3 Q	0–11	12	did not advance	
Einar Levison	Foil	N/A		4–2	3 Q	1–4	5	did not advance	
Ivan Osiier	Épée	3–6	7	did not advance					
Ivan Osiier	Foil	N/A		4–2	2 Q	3–2	3 Q	4–7	8
Poul Rasmussen	Épée	6–3	2 Q	4–6	9	did not advance			
Kay Schrøder	Épée	3–4	6	did not advance					
Kay Schrøder	Foil	N/A		0–8	9	did not advance			
Aage Berntsen; Verner Bonde; Einar Levison; Ivan Osiier; Poul Rasmussen	Team sabre	N/A						2–5	6
Georg Hegner; Einar Levison; Ivan Osiier; Poul Rasmussen; Kay Schrøder	Team foil	N/A				3–1	2 Q	1–3	4
Otto Bærentzen; Aage Berntsen; Georg Hegner; Einar Levison; Ivan Osiier; Poul Rasmussen	Team épée	N/A				1–4	5	did not advance	

== Field hockey ==
Denmark competed in field hockey for the first time. The team took second place in the four-team round robin, losing to Great Britain but defeating Belgium and France.

Team	Event	Final	
Team	Event	Result	Rank
Denmark men's national field hockey team	Field hockey	2–1	2nd place, silver medalist(s)

== Football ==
- First round
  - Lost to Spain (0-1)
- → Did not advance
- Team roster
  - Sophus Hansen, BK Frem (goalkeeper)
  - Steen Steensen Blicher, KB
  - Christian Grøthan, B 93
  - Ivar Lykke, KB
  - Nils Middelboe, KB
  - Gunnar Aaby, AB
  - Bernhard V. Andersen, BK Frem
  - Leo Dannin, KB
  - Viggo Jørgensen, B 1903
  - Alf Olsen, KB
  - Michael Rohde, B 93
  - Reserve: Paul Berth, AB
  - Reserve: Poul Graae, KB
  - Reserve: Carl Hansen, B 1903
  - Reserve: Jens Jensen, B 1903
  - Reserve: Vilhelm Jørgensen, B 1903
  - Reserve: Poul Nielsen, ØB
  - Reserve: Svend Ringsted, AB
  - Reserve: Fritz Tarp, B 93
  - Reserve: Samuel Thorsteinsson, AB

Head coach: Jack Carr

== Gymnastics ==
Forty-five gymnasts represented Denmark in 1920. It was the nation's fourth appearance in the sport. Denmark sent teams in two out of the three team events, but no individual all-around competitors. The Danish gymnasts took the gold medal in the free system and the silver medal in the Swedish system.

=== Artistic gymnastics ===
Gymnast	Event	Final	
Gymnast	Event	Result	Rank
Georg Albertsen; Rudolf Andersen; Viggo Dibbern; Fritz Eisenøe; Aage Frandsen; Hans Hansen; Hugo Helsteen; Harry Holm; Herold Jansson; Robert Johnsen; Christian Juhl; Vilhelm Lange; Svend Madsen; Peder Marcussen; Peder Møller; Lukas Nielsen; Niels Turin Nielsen; Oluf Olsson; Steen Olsen; Hans Rønne; Harry Sørensen; Christian Thomas; Knud Vermehren	Team, free system	51.35	1st place, gold medalist(s)
Johannes Birk; Frede Hansen; Frederik Hansen; Kristian Hansen; Hans Hovgaard; Aage Jørgensen; Alfred Frøkjær Jørgensen; Alfred Ollerup Jørgensen; Arne Jørgensen; Knud Kirkeløkke; Jens Lambæk; Kristian Larsen; Kristian Madsen; Niels Kristian Nielsen; Niels Erik Nielsen; Hans Pedersen; Johannes Pedersen; Peter Dorf Pedersen; Rasmus Rasmussen; Dynes Pedersen; Hans Christian Sørensen; Hans Laurids Sørensen; Søren Sørensen; Aage Walther; Georg West	Team, Swedish system	1324.833	2nd place, silver medalist(s)

== Modern pentathlon ==
Four pentathletes represented Denmark in 1920. It was the nation's second appearance in the sport, having competed at both instances of the Olympic modern pentathlon.

A point-for-place system was used, with the lowest total score winning.

Pentathlete	Final						
Pentathlete	Riding	Fencing	Shooting	Swimming	Running	Total	Rank
Ejner Augsburg	14	4	14	8	17	57	9
Harry Bjørnholm	8	20	18	3	15	61	12
Marius Christensen	12	7	3	7	18	47	5
Johan Skjoldager	7	17	22	20	14	77	20

== Rowing ==
A single rower represented Denmark in 1920. It was the nation's second appearance in the sport. Denmark's lone sculler placed second in his quarterfinal heat, not advancing to the semifinals.

Ranks given are within the heat.

Rower	Cox	Event	Quarterfinals		Semifinals		Final	
Rower	Cox	Event	Result	Rank	Result	Rank	Result	Rank
Theodor Eyrich	N/A	Single sculls	8:11.0	2	did not advance			

== Shooting ==
Fifteen shooters represented Denmark in 1920. It was the nation's fifth appearance in the sport as well as the Olympics; Denmark was one of three nations (along with France and Great Britain) to have competed in each edition of the Olympic shooting events to that point. With a victory in the standing military rifle, Denmark took its first gold in shooting since 1900. Larsen and Madsen (both among the members of that five-man team) also added a silver medal each.

Shooter	Event	Final	
Shooter	Event	Result	Rank
Anton Andersen	300 m free rifle, 3 pos.	878	Unknown
Anton Andersen	300 m military rifle, prone	Unknown	
Christian Andersen	50 m free pistol	407	Unknown
Povl Gerlow	600 m military rifle, prone	57	8
Laurits Larsen	50 m free pistol	475	4
Niels Larsen	50 m free pistol	470	5
Niels Larsen	300 m free rifle, 3 pos.	989	2nd place, silver medalist(s)
Niels Larsen	300 m military rifle, prone	Unknown	
Niels Larsen	300 m military rifle, standing	51	Unknown
Niels Larsen	600 m military rifle, prone	55	Unknown
Niels Laursen	300 m free rifle, 3 pos.	903	Unknown
Lars Jørgen Madsen	50 m free pistol	450	Unknown
Lars Jørgen Madsen	50 m small-bore rifle	378	Unknown
Lars Jørgen Madsen	300 m free rifle, 3 pos.	951	Unknown
Lars Jørgen Madsen	300 m military rifle, prone	57	Unknown
Lars Jørgen Madsen	300 m military rifle, standing	55	2nd place, silver medalist(s)
Lars Jørgen Madsen	600 m military rifle, prone	55	Unknown
Christen Møller	50 m small-bore rifle	359	Unknown
Christen Møller	300 m military rifle, prone	Unknown	
Christen Møller	600 m military rifle, prone	55	Unknown
Anders Peter Nielsen	50 m small-bore rifle	374	Unknown
Anders Peter Nielsen	300 m military rifle, standing	53	7
Carl Pedersen	50 m free pistol	413	Unknown
Anders Petersen	300 m military rifle, standing	53	7
Peter Petersen	300 m free rifle, 3 pos.	923	Unknown
Otto Plantener	50 m free pistol	419	Unknown
Erik Sætter-Lassen	50 m small-bore rifle	378	Unknown
Erik Sætter-Lassen	300 m military rifle, prone	Unknown	
Erik Sætter-Lassen	300 m military rifle, standing	54	4
Otto Wegener	50 m small-bore rifle	373	Unknown
Otto Wegener	600 m military rifle, prone	56	Unknown
Anton Andersen; Niels Larsen; Niels Laursen; Lars Jørgen Madsen; Peter Petersen	Team free rifle	4644	5
Anton Andersen; Niels Larsen; Lars Jørgen Madsen; Peter Petersen; Otto Plantener	300 m team military rifle, prone	268	13
Christian Andersen; Niels Larsen; Lars Jørgen Madsen; Carl Pedersen; Otto Plantener	50 m team free pistol	2159	8
Niels Larsen; Lars Jørgen Madsen; Anders Peter Nielsen; Anders Petersen; Erik Sætter-Lassen	300 m team military rifle, standing	266	1st place, gold medalist(s)
Lars Jørgen Madsen; Christen Møller; Anders Peter Nielsen; Erik Sætter-Lassen; Otto Wegener	50 m team small-bore rifle	1862	4

== Tennis ==
Three tennis players, one man and two women, competed for Denmark in 1920. It was the nation's second appearance in the sport. The team won no medals, but the mixed pair of Hansen and Tegner took fourth place after winning two matches to advance to the semifinals before losing there and in the bronze medal match.

Player	Event	Round of 64	Round of 32	Round of 16	Quarterfinals	Semifinals	Finals	Rank
Player	Event	Opposition Score	Opposition Score	Opposition Score	Opposition Score	Opposition Score	Opposition Score	Rank
Elsebeth Brehm	Women's singles	N/A	Dupont (BEL); W 6–3, 6–4	Strömberg (SWE); L 7–5, 6–3	did not advance			9
Amory Hansen	Women's singles	N/A	Bye	D'Ayen (FRA); L 6–2, 6–3	did not advance			9
Erik Tegner	Men's singles	Bye	Kashio (JPN); L 6–3, 6–1, 6–2	did not advance				17
Elsebeth Brehm; Amory Hansen	Women's doubles	N/A	N/A	Bye	Arendt & Storms (BEL); L 6–1, 6–1	did not advance		5
Amory Hansen; Erik Tegner	Mixed doubles	N/A	Bye	de Borman & Washer (BEL); W 4–6, 8–6, 6–3	Malström & Strömberg (SWE); W 0–6, 6–1, 6–2	Décugis & Lenglen (FRA); L 6–0, 6–1	Skrbková & Žemla-Rázný (TCH); L 8–6, 6–4	4

Opponent nation	Wins	Losses	Percent
Belgium	2	1	.667
Czechoslovakia	0	1	.000
France	0	2	.000
Japan	0	1	.000
Sweden	1	1	.500
Total	3	6	.333

Round	Wins	Losses	Percent
Round of 64	0	0	–
Round of 32	1	1	.500
Round of 16	1	2	.667
Quarterfinals	1	1	.500
Semifinals	0	1	.000
Final	0	0	–
Bronze match	0	1	.000
Total	3	6	.333

== Weightlifting ==
Five weightlifters, one in each weight class, represented Denmark in 1920. It was the nation's second appearance in the sport, having competed in 1896 but not in 1900. Ejnar Jensen had the best result, placing fourth in the unlimited heavyweight class.

Weightlifter	Weight class	Final	
Weightlifter	Weight class	Result	Rank
Niels Florin	60 kg	180.0	10
Thorvald Hansen	67.5 kg	202.5	11
Christian Jensen	75 kg	215.0	6
Ejnar Jensen	+82.5 kg	250.0	4
Søren Petersen	82.5 kg	217.5	10

== Wrestling ==
Ten wrestlers competed for Denmark in 1920. It was the nation's third appearance in the sport. All of the Danish wrestlers competed in Greco-Roman wrestling, with none participating in the freestyle competitions. Hansen was the only Dane to win a medal match, taking the heavyweight silver. Eriksen also won a bronze medal, after losing the silver medal match in the only weight class in which no bronze tournament was held. Frisenfeldt reached a silver medal final, while Torgensen reached a bronze match; both lost those matches.

=== Greco-Roman ===
Wrestler	Event	Round of 32	Round of 16	Quarterfinals	Semifinals	Finals	Rank
Wrestler	Event	Round of 32	Round of 16	Silver quarters	Silver semis	Silver match	Rank
Wrestler	Event	Round of 32	Round of 16	Bronze quarters	Bronze semis	Bronze match	Rank
Emil Christensen	Middleweight	Lindfors (FIN) (L)	Did not advance	did not advance			5
Emil Christensen	Middleweight	Lindfors (FIN) (L)	Did not advance	did not advance			5
Emil Christensen	Middleweight	Lindfors (FIN) (L)	Did not advance	Bye	Johnsen (NOR) (L)	Did not advance	5
Fritz Christiansen	Lightweight	Väre (FIN) (L)	Did not advance	did not advance			9
Fritz Christiansen	Lightweight	Väre (FIN) (L)	Did not advance	Janssens (BEL) (L)	did not advance		9
Fritz Christiansen	Lightweight	Väre (FIN) (L)	Did not advance	did not advance			9
Johannes Eriksen	Light heavyweight	Bye	Pendleton (USA) (W)	Johansson (SWE) (L)	did not advance		3rd place, bronze medalist(s)
Johannes Eriksen	Light heavyweight	Bye	Pendleton (USA) (W)	N/A	Sint (NED) (W)	Rosenqvist (FIN) (L)	3rd place, bronze medalist(s)
Johannes Eriksen	Light heavyweight	Bye	Pendleton (USA) (W)	N/A			3rd place, bronze medalist(s)
Frants Frisenfeldt	Lightweight	Pavlidis (GRE) (W)	Savonet (BEL) (W)	Metropoulos (USA) (W)	Väre (FIN) (L)	Did not advance	7
Frants Frisenfeldt	Lightweight	Pavlidis (GRE) (W)	Savonet (BEL) (W)	Bye	Rohon (FRA) (W)	Tamminen (FIN) (L)	7
Frants Frisenfeldt	Lightweight	Pavlidis (GRE) (W)	Savonet (BEL) (W)	Andersen (NOR) (L)	did not advance		7
Poul Hansen	Heavyweight	Bye	Weyand (USA) (W)	Nieminen (FIN) (W)	Lindfors (FIN) (L)	Did not advance	2nd place, silver medalist(s)
Poul Hansen	Heavyweight	Bye	Weyand (USA) (W)	Dame (FRA) (W)	Gasiglia (FRA) (W)	Willkie (USA) (W)	2nd place, silver medalist(s)
Poul Hansen	Heavyweight	Bye	Weyand (USA) (W)	Won silver			2nd place, silver medalist(s)
Svend Jensen	Featherweight	Bye	Svensson (SWE) (L)	did not advance			11
Svend Jensen	Featherweight	Bye	Svensson (SWE) (L)	N/A	did not advance		11
Svend Jensen	Featherweight	Bye	Svensson (SWE) (L)	did not advance			11
Emil Larsen	Heavyweight	Bye	Nieminen (FIN) (L)	did not advance			12
Emil Larsen	Heavyweight	Bye	Nieminen (FIN) (L)	did not advance			12
Emil Larsen	Heavyweight	Bye	Nieminen (FIN) (L)	did not advance			12
Svend Nielsen	Middleweight	Leloux (NED) (W)	Perttilä (FIN) (L)	did not advance			12
Svend Nielsen	Middleweight	Leloux (NED) (W)	Perttilä (FIN) (L)	did not advance			12
Svend Nielsen	Middleweight	Leloux (NED) (W)	Perttilä (FIN) (L)	did not advance			12
Axel Tetens	Light heavyweight	Bye	Kruusenberg (EST) (W)	Maichle (USA) (W)	Johansson (SWE) (L)	Did not advance	4
Axel Tetens	Light heavyweight	Bye	Kruusenberg (EST) (W)	N/A	Rosenqvist (FIN) (L)	Did not advance	4
Axel Tetens	Light heavyweight	Bye	Kruusenberg (EST) (W)	N/A			4
Rasmus Torgensen	Featherweight	Řezáč (TCH) (W)	Bovis (FRA) (W)	Kähkönen (FIN) (L)	did not advance		4
Rasmus Torgensen	Featherweight	Řezáč (TCH) (W)	Bovis (FRA) (W)	N/A	did not advance		4
Rasmus Torgensen	Featherweight	Řezáč (TCH) (W)	Bovis (FRA) (W)	Brian (USA) (W)	Pütsep (EST) (W)	Svensson (SWE) (L)	4

Opponent nation	Wins	Losses	Percent
Belgium	1	1	.500
Czechoslovakia	1	0	1.000
Estonia	2	0	1.000
Finland	1	10	.091
France	4	0	1.000
Greece	1	0	1.000
Netherlands	2	0	1.000
Norway	0	2	.000
Sweden	0	4	.000
United States	6	0	1.000
Total	18	17	.514

Round	Wins	Losses	Percent
Round of 32	3	2	.600
Round of 16	5	3	.625
Quarterfinals	3	2	.600
Semifinals	0	3	.000
Final	0	0	–
Silver quarterfinals	1	1	.500
Silver semifinals	3	1	.750
Silver match	1	2	.333
Bronze quarterfinals	1	1	.500
Bronze semifinals	1	1	.500
Bronze match	0	1	.000
Total	18	17	.514
