= Cycling at the 1920 Summer Olympics – Men's individual time trial =

Cycling at the Olympics

Men's individual time trial at the Games of the VII Olympiad
- Venue: Antwerp
- Date: 13 August
- Competitors: 46 from 12 nations

Medalists
1st place, gold medalist(s)		Harry Stenqvist	Sweden
2nd place, silver medalist(s)		Henry Kaltenbrunn	South Africa
3rd place, bronze medalist(s)		Fernand Canteloube	France

The men's individual time trial event was part of the road cycling programme at the 1920 Summer Olympics. The results of individual cyclists were summed to give team results in the team time trial event.

== Results ==
Place	Cyclist	Time
1	Harry Stenqvist (SWE)	4:40:01.8
2	Henry Kaltenbrunn (RSA)	4:41:26.6
3	Fernand Canteloube (FRA)	4:42:54.4
4	Bernard Janssens (BEL)	4:44:20.6
5	Albert De Bunné (BEL)	4:45:23.4
6	Georges Detreille (FRA)	4:46:13.4
7	Ragnar Malm (SWE)	4:46:22.0
8	Piet Ikelaar (NED)	4:46:54.0
9	William Genders (GBR)	4:50:23.6
10	Achille Souchard (FRA)	4:51:56.0
11	Johan Johansen (DEN)	4:52:00.2
12	Axel Persson (SWE)	4:53:43.6
13	Ernest Kockler (USA)	4:55:12.2
14	Marcel Gobillot (FRA)	4:55:39.6
15	André Vercruysse (BEL)	4:55:41.4
16	Federico Gay (ITA)	4:57:21.8
17	Johan Lundgren (DEN)	4:58:01.0
18	Leonard Meredith (GBR)	4:58:55.6
19	Kristian Frisch (DEN)	5:01:18.8
20	Georg Claussen (DEN)	5:02:12.2
21	Pietro Bestetti (ITA)	5:02:15.0
22	Sigfrid Lundberg (SWE)	5:03:02.6
23	Albert Wyckmans (BEL)	5:03:19.0
24	Camillo Arduino (ITA)	5:05:26.8
25	Nicolaas de Jong (NED)	5:06:46.6
26	David Marsh (GBR)	5:09:23.6
27	Arie van der Stel (NED)	5:12:42.6
28	Helge Flatby (NOR)	5:12:50.2
29	Paul Henrichsen (NOR)	5:13:23.2
30	August Nogara (USA)	5:20:08.0
31	Herbert McDonald (CAN)	5:20:34.6
32	Dante Ghindani (ITA)	5:21:50.4
33	Pieter Kloppenburg (NED)	5:22:16.0
34	Josef Procházka (TCH)	5:23:31.4
35	Olaf Nygaard (NOR)	5:24:56.6
36	Ladislav Janoušek (TCH)	5:29:23.4
37	James Freeman (USA)	5:29:26.2
38	Harry Martin (CAN)	5:30:16.2
39	František Kundert (TCH)	5:38:07.0
40	Bohumil Rameš (TCH)	5:40:00.0
41	Thorstein Stryken (NOR)	5:44:01.8
42	John Otto (USA)	5:47:50.2
—	James Walker (RSA)	DNF
—	Norman Webster (CAN)	DNF
—	Harold Bounsall (CAN)	DNF
—	Edward Newell (GBR)	DNF

== Notes ==
- Belgium Olympic Committee (1957). Olympic Games Antwerp 1920: Official Report (in French).
- Wudarski, Pawel (1999). "Wyniki Igrzysk Olimpijskich" (in Polish). Archived from the original on 16 February 2009.
