= Cycling at the 1920 Summer Olympics – Men's team time trial =

Cycling at the Olympics

Men's team time trial at the Games of the VII Olympiad
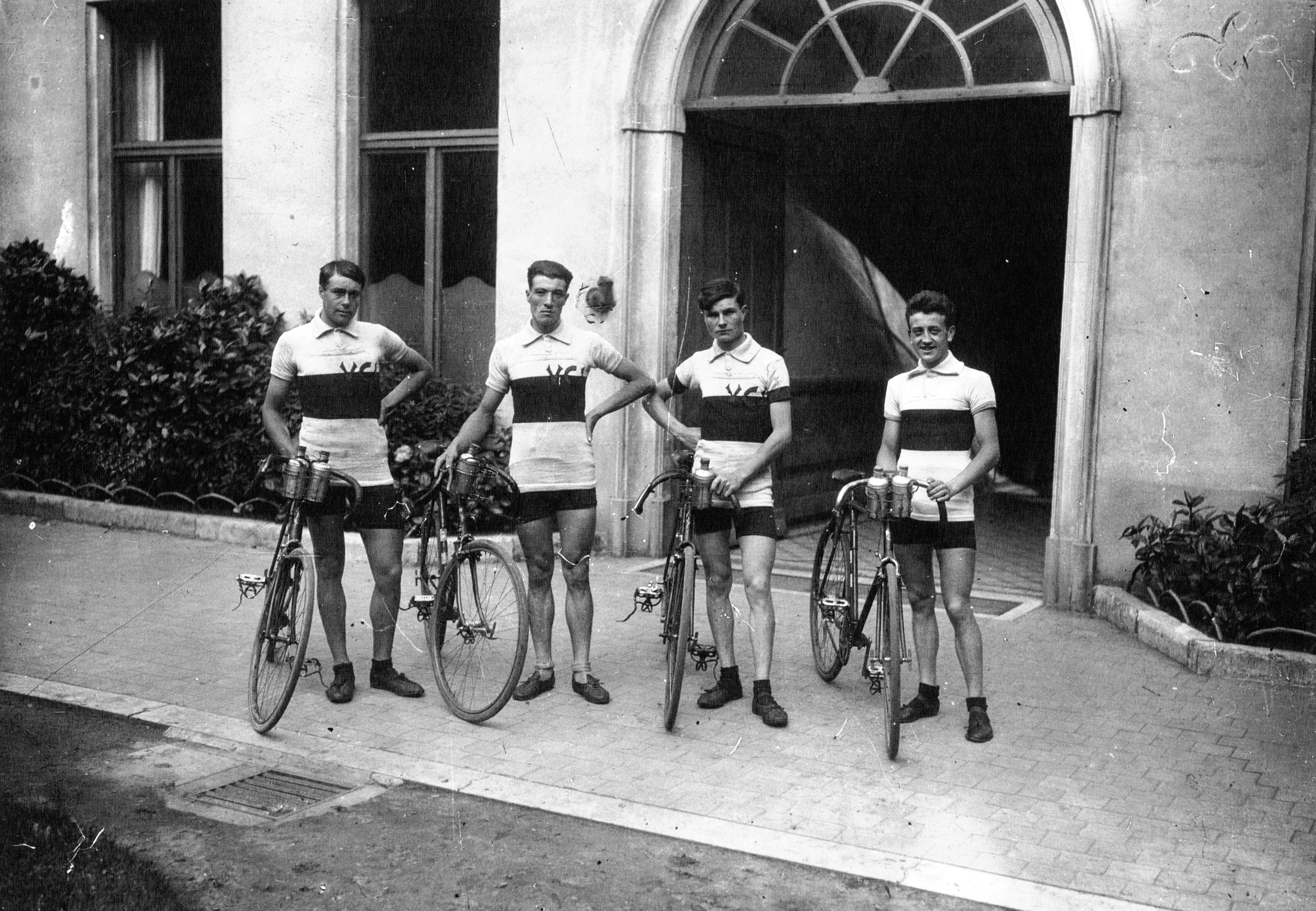
- The winning team from France
- Venue: Antwerp
- Date: 13 August 1920
- Competitors: 44 from 11 nations

Medalists
1st place, gold medalist(s)		Fernand Canteloube, Georges Detreille, Marcel Gobillot, Achille Souchard; France
2nd place, silver medalist(s)		Sigfrid Lundberg, Ragnar Malm, Axel Persson, Harry Stenqvist; Sweden
3rd place, bronze medalist(s)		Albert De Bunné, Bernard Janssens, André Vercruysse, Albert Wyckmans; Belgium

The men's team time trial event was part of the road cycling programme at the 1920 Summer Olympics. The results of individual cyclists in the individual time trial event were summed to give team results.

== Results ==
Place	Team	Cyclists	Time
1	France	Fernand Canteloube, Georges Detreille, Marcel Gobillot, Achille Souchard	19:16:43.4
2	Sweden	Sigfrid Lundberg, Ragnar Malm, Axel Persson, Harry Stenqvist	19:23:10.0
3	Belgium	Albert De Bunné, Bernard Janssens, André Vercruysse, Albert Wyckmans	19:28:44.4
4	Denmark	Johan Johansen, Johan Lundgren, Kristian Frisch, Georg Claussen	19:53:32.2
5	Italy	Federico Gay, Pietro Bestetti, Camillo Arduino, Dante Ghindani	20:24:44.0
6	Netherlands	Piet Ikelaar, Nicolaas de Jong, Arie van der Stel, Pieter Kloppenburg	20:28:39.2
7	United States	Ernest Kockler, August Nogara, James Freeman, John Otto	21:32:36.6
8	Norway	Helge Flatby, Paul Henrichsen, Olaf Nygaard, Thorstein Stryken	21:35:11.8
9	Czechoslovakia	Josef Procházka, Ladislav Janoušek, František Kundert, Bohumil Rameš	22:10:01.8
10	Great Britain	William Genders, Leonard Meredith, David Marsh, Edward Newell	DNF
11	Canada	Herbert McDonald, Harry Martin, Norman Webster, Harold Bounsall	DNF

== Notes ==
- Belgium Olympic Committee (1957). Olympic Games Antwerp 1920: Official Report (in French).
- Wudarski, Pawel (1999). "Wyniki Igrzysk Olimpijskich" (in Polish). Archived from the original on 16 February 2009.
