= Time trial at the Olympics =

The time trial is one of two road bicycle racing events held at the Summer Olympics, the other being the road race. The time trial has individual starts in intervals. The men's time trials was first held at the 1912, and then again in 1996 Summer Olympics after professional and amateur cycling made a resurgence in popularity. The women's event was first contested at the 1996 Summer Olympics. The women's individual time trial was introduced in 1996, and has been run ever since.

== Medalists ==
=== Men ===
Games	Gold	Silver	Bronze
1912 Stockholm	Rudolph Lewis; South Africa	Frederick Grubb; Great Britain	Carl Schutte; United States
1920 Antwerp	Harry Stenqvist; Sweden	Henry Kaltenbrunn; South Africa	Fernand Canteloube; France
1924 Paris	Armand Blanchonnet; France	Henri Hoevenaers; Belgium	René Hamel; France
1928 Amsterdam	Henry Hansen; Denmark	Frank Southall; Great Britain	Gösta Carlsson; Sweden
1932 Los Angeles	Attilio Pavesi; Italy	Guglielmo Segato; Italy	Bernhard Britz; Sweden
1936–1992	not included in the Olympic program		
1996 Atlanta	Miguel Indurain; Spain	Abraham Olano; Spain	Chris Boardman; Great Britain
2000 Sydney	Viacheslav Ekimov; Russia	Jan Ullrich; Germany	None awarded
2004 Athens	Viatcheslav Ekimov; Russia	Bobby Julich; United States	Michael Rogers; Australia
2008 Beijing	Fabian Cancellara; Switzerland	Gustav Larsson; Sweden	Levi Leipheimer; United States
2012 London	Bradley Wiggins; Great Britain	Tony Martin; Germany	Chris Froome; Great Britain
2016 Rio de Janeiro	Fabian Cancellara; Switzerland	Tom Dumoulin; Netherlands	Chris Froome; Great Britain
2020 Tokyo	Primož Roglič; Slovenia	Tom Dumoulin; Netherlands	Rohan Dennis; Australia
2024 Paris	Remco Evenepoel; Belgium	Filippo Ganna; Italy	Wout van Aert; Belgium
2028 Los Angeles			

Medalists by country after Summer Olympic Paris 2024

Rank	Nation	Gold	Silver	Bronze	Total
1	Russia	2	0	0	2
1	Switzerland	2	0	0	2
3	Great Britain	1	2	3	6
4	Italy	1	2	0	3
5	Sweden	1	1	2	4
6	Belgium	1	1	1	3
7	South Africa	1	1	0	2
7	Spain	1	1	0	2
9	France	1	0	2	3
10	Denmark	1	0	0	1
10	Slovenia	1	0	0	1
12	Germany	0	2	0	2
12	Netherlands	0	2	0	2
14	United States	0	1	2	3
15	Australia	0	0	2	2
Totals (15 entries)		13	13	12	38

=== Women ===
Games	Gold	Silver	Bronze
1996 Atlanta	Zulfiya Zabirova; Russia	Jeannie Longo-Ciprelli; France	Clara Hughes; Canada
2000 Sydney	Leontien Zijlaard; Netherlands	Mari Holden; United States	Jeannie Longo-Ciprelli; France
2004 Athens	Leontien van Moorsel; Netherlands	Dede Barry; United States	Karin Thürig; Switzerland
2008 Beijing	Kristin Armstrong; United States	Emma Pooley; Great Britain	Karin Thürig; Switzerland
2012 London	Kristin Armstrong; United States	Judith Arndt; Germany	Olga Zabelinskaya; Russia
2016 Rio de Janeiro	Kristin Armstrong; United States	Olga Zabelinskaya; Russia	Anna van der Breggen; Netherlands
2020 Tokyo	Annemiek van Vleuten; Netherlands	Marlen Reusser; Switzerland	Anna van der Breggen; Netherlands
2024 Paris	Grace Brown; Australia	Anna Henderson; Great Britain	Chloé Dygert; United States
2028 Los Angeles			

==== Multiple medallists ====
Rank	Athlete	Nation	Olympics	Gold	Silver	Bronze	Total
1	Kristin Armstrong	United States	2008–2016	3	0	0	3
2	Leontien van Moorsel	Netherlands	2000–2004	2	0	0	2
3	Jeannie Longo	France	1996–2000	0	1	1	2
4	Olga Zabelinskaya	Russia	2012-2016	0	1	1	2
5	Karin Thürig	Switzerland	2004–2008	0	0	2	2
6	Anna van der Breggen	Netherlands	2016-2020	0	0	2	2

==== Medallists by country ====
Medalists by country after Summer Olympic Paris 2024

Rank	Nation	Gold	Silver	Bronze	Total
1	United States	3	2	1	8
2	Netherlands	3	0	2	5
3	Russia	1	1	1	3
4	Australia	1	0	0	1
5	Great Britain	0	2	0	2
6	Switzerland	0	1	2	3
7	France	0	1	1	2
8	Germany	0	1	0	1
9	Canada	0	0	1	1
