= Leo Giunchi =

Italian boxer

Leonard Giunchi (17 January 1896 – 18 March 1967) was an Italian boxer who competed in the 1920 Summer Olympics. He was born in Rome. In 1920 he was eliminated in the first round of the lightweight class after losing his fight to Julien Van Muysen.
