= Johan Sæterhaug =

Norwegian boxer and speed skater

Johan Sæterhaug (27 March 1893 – 6 July 1968) was a Norwegian boxer who competed in the 1920 Summer Olympics.

In 1920, he was eliminated in the second round of the lightweight class after losing his fight to the upcoming bronze medalist Clarence Newton.

He represented the club SK Brage. He was a brother of Olympic cyclist Martin Sæterhaug.
