= John Otto =

John Otto may refer to:

- John Otto (drummer) (born 1977), original member of the band Limp Bizkit
- John E. Otto (1938–2020), acting director of the FBI in 1987
- John Otto (park ranger) (1870–1952), first superintendent at Colorado National Monument
- John Otto (radio personality) (1929–1999), American radio talk show host
- John Otto (cyclist) (1900–1966), American Olympic cyclist
- John Otto (politician) (1948–2020), American politician
- John Conrad Otto (1774–1844), American physician
