= Christian Juhl =

Christian Juhl may refer to:

- Christian Juhl (gymnast)
- Christian Juhl (politician)
