= Joseph Solvinto =

French boxer

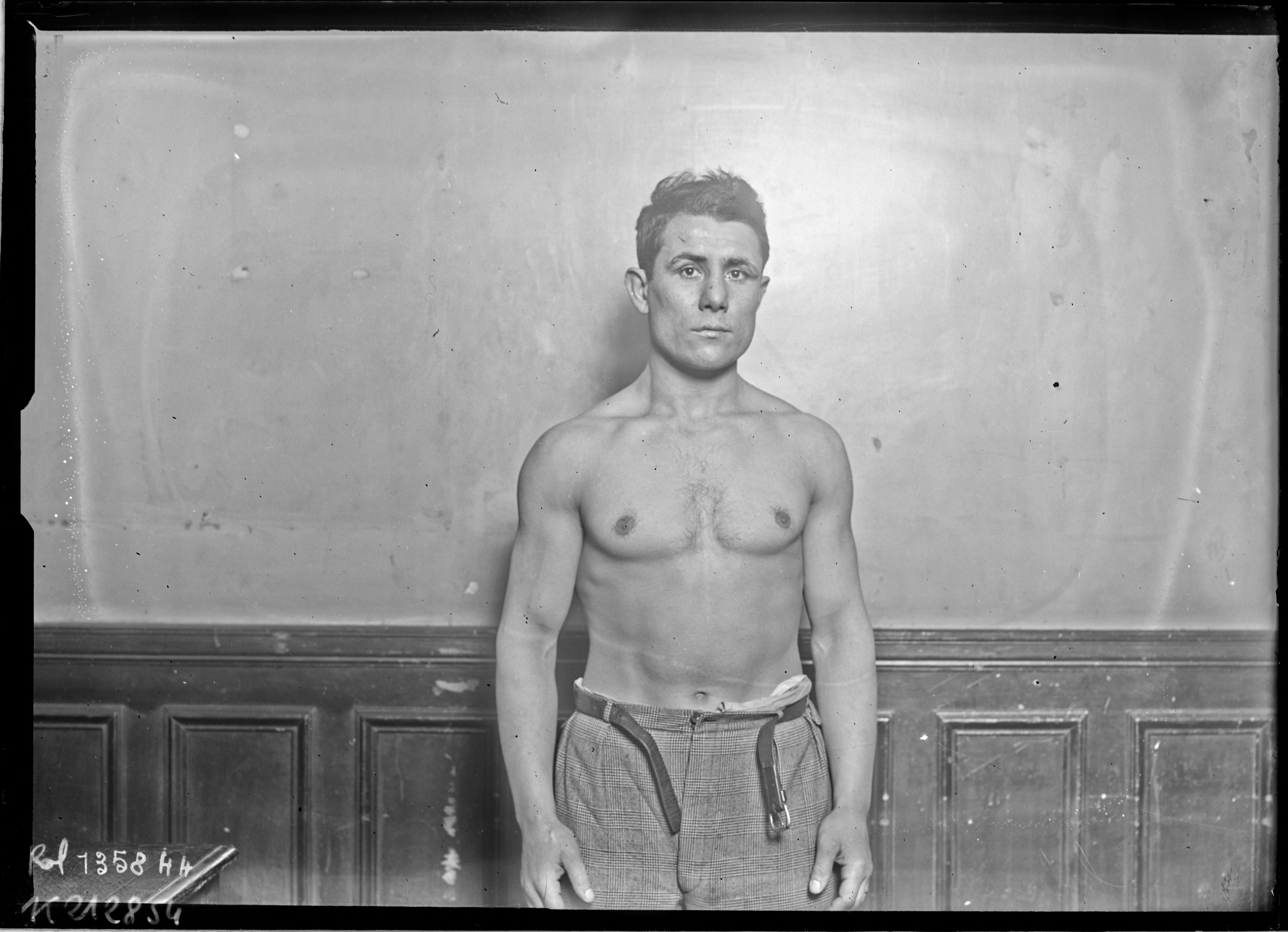

Joseph Solvinto (13 April 1902 – 13 September 1979) was a French boxer who competed in the 1920 Summer Olympics. In 1920, he was eliminated in the first round of the lightweight class after losing his fight to the upcoming gold medalist Samuel Mosberg.
