= Harry Holm =

Danish artistic gymnast

- Born: 14 September 1902 Kristrup, Denmark
- Died: 25 December 1987 (aged 85) Esbjerg, Denmark

Gymnastics career
- Discipline: Men's artistic gymnastics
- Country represented: Denmark
Medal record
Men's artistic gymnastics
Representing Denmark
Olympic Games
Gold medal – first place	1920 Antwerp	Team, free system

Harry Holm (14 September 1902 – 25 December 1987) was a Danish gymnast who competed in the 1920 Summer Olympics. He was part of the Danish team, which was able to win the gold medal in the gymnastics men's team, free system event in 1920.
