= Boxing at the 1920 Summer Olympics – Lightweight =

Boxing competitions

Men's lightweight boxing at the Games of the VII Olympiad
- Venue: Antwerp Zoo auditorium
- Dates: August 21–24, 1920
- Competitors: 16 from 10 nations

Medalists
1st place, gold medalist(s)		Samuel Mosberg	United States
2nd place, silver medalist(s)		Gotfred Johansen	Denmark
3rd place, bronze medalist(s)		Clarence Newton	Canada

The men's lightweight event was part of the boxing programme at the 1920 Summer Olympics. The weight class was the fourth-lightest contested, and allowed boxers of up to 135.5 pounds (61.2 kilograms). The competition was held from August 21, 1920 to August 24, 1920. 16 boxers from ten nations competed.

== Results ==
Round of 16; August 21
Samuel Mosberg (USA)	W
Joseph Solvinto (FRA)	L
Frederick Grace (GBR)	W
Herman Nak (NED)	L
Richard Beland (RSA)	W
Jacques Grégoire (FRA)	L
Julien Van Muysen (BEL)	W
Leo Giunchi (ITA)	L
Gotfred Johansen (DEN)	W
Jean Neys (BEL)	L
Frank Cassidy (USA)	W
Ko Janssens (NED)	L
Johan Sæterhaug (NOR)	W
Jim Gilmour (GBR)	L
Clarence Newton (CAN)	W
Johan Jensen (DEN)	L

Quarterfinals; August 22
Mosberg (USA)	W
Grace (GBR)	L
Beland (RSA)	W
Van Muysen (BEL)	L
Johansen (DEN)	W
Cassidy (USA)	L
Sæterhaug (NOR)	L
Newton (CAN)	W

Semifinals; August 23
Mosberg (USA)	W
Beland (RSA)	L
Johansen (DEN)	W
Newton (CAN)	L

Final; August 24
Mosberg (USA)	W
Johansen (DEN)	L
Bronze medal bout
Newton (CAN)	W
Beland (RSA)	L

== Sources ==
- Belgium Olympic Committee (1957). Olympic Games Antwerp 1920: Official Report (in French).
- Wudarski, Pawel (1999). "Wyniki Igrzysk Olimpijskich" (in Polish).
