= Jacques Grégoire =

French boxer

Personal information
- Nationality: French
- Born: 22 August 1901 Paris, France
- Died: 14 March 1946 (aged 44) Le Kremlin-Bicêtre, France

Sport
- Sport: Boxing

Jacques Grégoire (22 August 1901 – 14 March 1946) was a French boxer. He competed in the men's lightweight event at the 1920 Summer Olympics.
