= Niels Turin Nielsen =

Danish artistic gymnast

- Full name: Niels Christian Congo Turin Nielsen
- Born: 22 January 1887 Frederiksberg, Denmark
- Died: 9 June 1964 (aged 77) Frederiksberg, Denmark

Gymnastics career
- Discipline: Men's artistic gymnastics
- Country represented: Denmark
Medal record
Men's artistic gymnastics
Representing Denmark
Olympic Games
| Gold medal – first place | 1920 Antwerp | Team, free system |

Niels Christian Congo Turin Nielsen (22 January 1887 – 9 June 1964) was a Danish gymnast who competed in the 1908 Summer Olympics and in the 1920 Summer Olympics.

In 1908, he finished fourth with the Danish team in the team event. Twelve years later, he was part of the Danish team, which won the gold medal in the gymnastics men's team free system event.
