= Vilhelm Lange =

Danish gymnast

- Full name: Kristian Vilhelm Lange
- Born: 20 December 1893 Ringkøbing, Denmark
- Died: 17 November 1950 (aged 56) Frederiksberg, Denmark

Gymnastics career
- Discipline: Men's artistic gymnastics
- Country represented: Denmark
Medal record
Men's artistic gymnastics
Representing Denmark
Olympic Games
Gold medal – first place	1920 Antwerp	Team, free system

Kristian Vilhelm Lange (20 December 1893 in Ringkøbing, Denmark – 17 November 1950 in Frederiksberg, Denmark), was a Danish gymnast who competed in the 1920 Summer Olympics. He was a member of the Danish team, which was able to win the gold medal in the gymnastics men's team, free system event in 1920.
