= Jim Gilmour (boxer) =

British boxer

Personal information
- Nationality: British (Scottish)
- Born: 30 April 1891 Glasgow, Scotland
- Died: 1 October 1963 (aged 72) Bridgeton, Scotland

Sport
- Sport: Boxing

Jim Gilmour (30 April 1891 – 1 October 1963) was a British boxer. He competed in the men's lightweight event at the 1920 Summer Olympics.
