= Rudolf Andersen =

Danish gymnast (1899–1983)

- Full name: Karl Rudolf Svend Andersen
- Born: 11 August 1899 Copenhagen, Denmark
- Died: 7 July 1983 (aged 83) Copenhagen, Denmark

Gymnastics career
- Discipline: Men's artistic gymnastics
- Country represented: Denmark
Medal record
Men's artistic gymnastics
Representing Denmark
Olympic Games
Gold medal – first place	1920 Antwerp	Team, free system

Karl Rudolf Svend Andersen (11 August 1899 – 7 July 1983) was a Danish gymnast who competed in the 1920 Summer Olympics. He was part of the Danish team, which was able to win the gold medal in the gymnastics men's team, free system event in 1920.
