= Harry Sørensen (gymnast) =

Danish artistic gymnast

- Full name: Rino Harry Charles Sørensen
- Born: 19 April 1892 Flensburg, German Empire
- Died: 14 September 1963 (aged 71) Aarhus, Denmark

Gymnastics career
- Discipline: Men's artistic gymnastics
- Country represented: Denmark
Medal record
Men's artistic gymnastics
Representing Denmark
Olympic Games
Gold medal – first place	1920 Antwerp	Team, free system

Rino Harry Charles Sørensen (19 April 1892 – 14 September 1963) was a Danish gymnast who competed in the 1920 Summer Olympics. He was part of the Danish team, which won the gold medal in the gymnastics men's team, free system event in 1920.
