= Aage Frandsen =

Danish gymnast

- Full name: Aage Valdemar Harald Frandsen
- Born: 18 October 1890 Copenhagen, Denmark
- Died: 24 March 1968 (aged 77) Copenhagen, Denmark

Gymnastics career
- Discipline: Men's artistic gymnastics
- Country represented: Denmark
Medal record
Men's artistic gymnastics
Representing Denmark
Olympic Games
| Gold medal – first place | 1920 Antwerp | Team, free system |

Aage Valdemar Harald Frandsen (18 October 1890 – 24 March 1968) was a Danish gymnast who competed in the 1920 Summer Olympics. He was part of the Danish team, which won the gold medal in the gymnastics men's team, free system event in 1920.

He also acted in a single movie with a minor role in the Danish movie Bag Filmens Kulisser (1923)
