= Sigfrid Lundberg =

Swedish cyclist

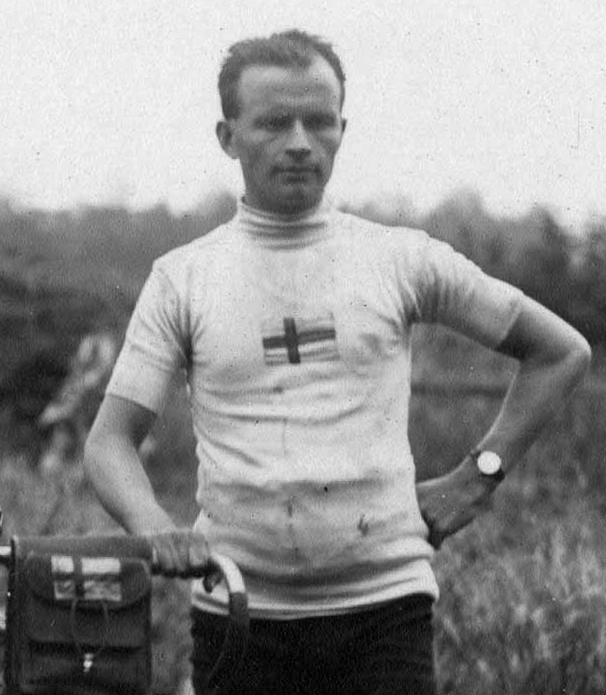
- Lundberg at the 1920 Summer Olympics

Personal information
- Full name: Sigfrid Lundberg
- Born: 15 February 1895 Uppsala, Sweden
- Died: 19 May 1979 (aged 84) Uppsala, Sweden

Sport
- Sport: Cycling
- Event: Road
- Club: Uppsalaklubbar CK Uni (1913–17); IF Thor (1917–28); SK Fyrishof (1929–)
Medal record
Representing Sweden
Men's road bicycle racing
Olympic Games
Silver medal – second place	1920 Antwerp	Team road race
- Updated on 7 September 2008

Ernst Sigfrid Lundberg (15 February 1895 – 19 May 1979) was a Swedish cyclist who competed at the 1920 Summer Olympics. He won a silver medal as part of the Swedish road cycling team, after finishing 22nd in the individual road race.

Lundberg was a welder by trade. He took part in 10 national championships and won at least 5 team titles.
