= Hugo Helsten =

Danish gymnast (1894–1978)

- Full name: Hugo Alexander Helsten
- Born: 15 September 1894 Frederikshavn, Denmark
- Died: 25 May 1978 (aged 83) Esbjerg, Denmark

Gymnastics career
- Discipline: Men's artistic gymnastics
- Country represented: Denmark
Medal record
Men's artistic gymnastics
Representing Denmark
Olympic Games
Gold medal – first place	1920 Antwerp	Team, free system

Hugo Alexander Helsten (15 September 1894 in Frederikshavn, Denmark – 25 May 1978 in Esbjerg, Denmark) was a Danish gymnast who competed in the 1920 Summer Olympics. He was part of the Danish team, which was able to win the gold medal in the gymnastics men's team, free system event in 1920.

At club level he was part of Hermod Esbjerg.
