= Stig Rønne =

Danish gymnast

- Full name: Hans Stig Trappaud Rønne
- Born: 30 December 1887 Herstedvester, Denmark
- Died: 15 September 1951 (aged 63) Copenhagen, Denmark

Gymnastics career
- Discipline: Men's artistic gymnastics
- Country represented: Denmark
Medal record
Men's artistic gymnastics
Representing Denmark
Olympic Games
Gold medal – first place	1920 Antwerp	Team, free system

Hans Stig Trappaud Rønne (30 December 1887 – 15 September 1951) was a Danish gymnast who competed in the 1920 Summer Olympics. He was part of the Danish team, which won the gold medal in the gymnastics men's team, free system event in 1920.
