= Christian Thomas (Danish gymnast) =

Danish artistic gymnast

- Full name: Christian Richard Thomas
- Born: 7 February 1896 Copenhagen, Denmark
- Died: 4 October 1970 (aged 74) Gentofte, Denmark

Gymnastics career
- Discipline: Men's artistic gymnastics
- Country represented: Denmark
Medal record
Men's artistic gymnastics
Representing Denmark
Olympic Games
Gold medal – first place	1920 Antwerp	Team, free system

Christian Richard Thomas (7 February 1896 in Copenhagen, Denmark – 4 October 1970 in Gentofte, Denmark) was a Danish gymnast who competed in the 1920 Summer Olympics. He was part of the Danish team, which won the gold medal in the gymnastics men's team, free system event in 1920.
