= Ko Janssens =

Dutch boxer

Jacobus Cornelius "Ko" Janssens (20 December 1889, Rotterdam - 21 August 1970, Epe) was a Dutch boxer who competed in the 1920 Summer Olympics. In 1920 he was eliminated in the first round of the lightweight class after losing his fight to Frank Cassidy.
