= Georg Albertsen =

Danish gymnast (1889–1961)

- Full name: Georg Albert Christian Albertsen
- Born: 12 July 1889 Fredriksberg, Denmark
- Died: 28 April 1961 (aged 71) Gentofte, Denmark

Gymnastics career
- Discipline: Men's artistic gymnastics
- Country represented: Denmark
Medal record
Men's artistic gymnastics
Representing Denmark
Olympic Games
Gold medal – first place	1920 Antwerp	Team, free system

Georg Albert Christian Albertsen (12 July 1889 – 28 April 1961) was a Danish gymnast who competed in the 1920 Summer Olympics. He was part of the Danish team, which was able to win the gold medal in the gymnastics men's team, free system event in 1920.
