= Frank Cassidy (boxer) =

American boxer

Personal information
- Born: December 7, 1895 New York, New York, United States
- Died: February 28, 1924 (aged 28)

Sport
- Sport: Boxing

Frank Cassidy (November 7, 1895 – February 28, 1924) was an American boxer. He competed in the men's lightweight event at the 1920 Summer Olympics. At the 1920 Summer Olympics, he defeated Ko Janssens of the Netherlands in his first fight, before being eliminated by Gotfred Johansen of Denmark in the quarterfinals.
