= Peter Møller (gymnast) =

Danish gymnast (1891–1972)

- Born: 28 February 1897 Copenhagen, Denmark
- Died: 17 October 1984 (aged 87) Copenhagen, Denmark

Gymnastics career
- Discipline: Men's artistic gymnastics
- Country represented: Denmark
Medal record
Men's artistic gymnastics
Representing Denmark
Olympic Games
Gold medal – first place	1920 Antwerp	Team, free system

Peter Møller (7 August 1891 – 16 December 1972) was a Danish gymnast who competed in the 1920 Summer Olympics. He was part of the Danish team, which was able to win the gold medal in the gymnastics men's team, free system event in 1920.
