= Viggo Dibbern =

Danish gymnast (1900–1982)

- Full name: Viggo Valdemar Dibbern
- Born: 10 July 1900 Frederiksberg, Denmark
- Died: 30 January 1982 (aged 81) Herlev, Denmark

Gymnastics career
- Discipline: Men's artistic gymnastics
- Country represented: Denmark
Medal record
Men's artistic gymnastics
Representing Denmark
Olympic Games
| Gold medal – first place | 1920 Antwerp | Team, free system |

Viggo Valdemar Dibbern (10 July 1900 – 30 January 1981) was a Danish gymnast who competed in the 1920 Summer Olympics. He was part of the Danish team, which was able to win the gold medal in the gymnastics men's team, free system event in 1920.
