= Knud Vermehren =

Danish artistic gymnast

- Full name: Knud Frederik Rasmus Vermehren
- Born: 19 December 1890 Copenhagen, Denmark
- Died: 1 January 1985 (aged 94) Gentofte, Denmark
- Relatives: Frederik Vermehren (grandfather)

Gymnastics career
- Discipline: Men's artistic gymnastics
- Country represented: Denmark
Medal record
Men's artistic gymnastics
Representing Denmark
Olympic Games
Gold medal – first place	1920 Antwerp	Team, free system

Knud Frederik Rasmus Vermehren (19 December 1890 – 1 January 1985) was a Danish gymnast who competed in the 1920 Summer Olympics. He was part of the Danish team, which won the gold medal in the gymnastics men's team, free system event in 1920.

He was the grandson of the Danish painter Frederik Vermehren.
