= Herman Nak =

Dutch boxer

Hermanus "Herman" Nak (6 September 1895, Amsterdam – 31 August 1972, Amsterdam) was a Dutch boxer who competed in the 1920 Summer Olympics. In 1920 he was eliminated in the first round of the lightweight class after losing his fight to Frederick Grace.
