= Robert Johnsen =

Danish artistic gymnast

- Full name: Robert Jacob Johnsen
- Born: 23 June 1896 Copenhagen, Denmark
- Died: 31 August 1975 (aged 79) Gentofte, Denmark

Gymnastics career
- Discipline: Men's artistic gymnastics
- Country represented: Denmark
Medal record
Men's artistic gymnastics
Representing Denmark
Olympic Games
| Gold medal – first place | 1920 Antwerp | Team, free system |

Robert Jacob Johnsen (23 June 1896 – 31 August 1975) was a Danish gymnast who competed in the 1920 Summer Olympics. He was part of the Danish team, which was able to win the gold medal in the gymnastics men's team, free system event in 1920.
