= Georges Detreille =

French cyclist

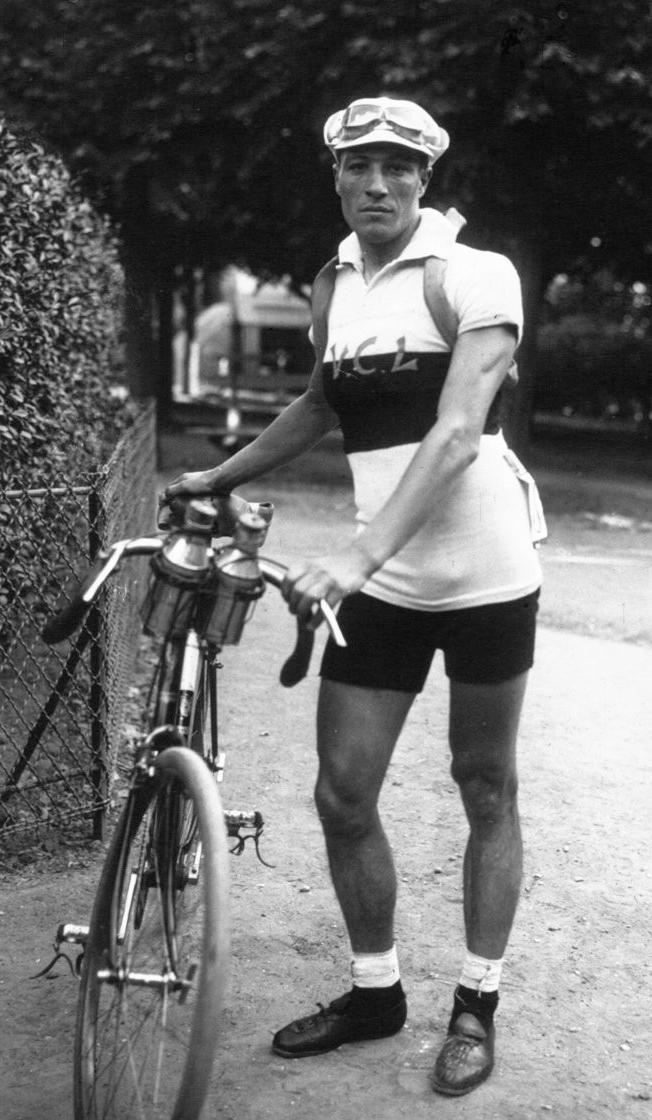
- Detreille in 1921

Personal information
- Born: 9 September 1893 Bourg-en-Bresse, France
- Died: 13 May 1957 (aged 63) Nice, France

Sport
- Sport: Cycling
- Event: Road race
Medal record
Representing France
Olympic Games
Gold medal – first place	1920 Antwerp	Team time trial

Georges Detreille (9 September 1893 – 13 May 1957) was a French cyclist who competed in the road race at the 1920 Summer Olympics. He finished sixth individually and won a gold medal as member of the French time trial team. In 1921 he turned professional and rode the 1926 Tour de France.
