= Sovizzo =

- Comune
- Comune di Sovizzo
- Location within Italy Location within Veneto
- Coordinates: 45°32′N 11°27′E
- Country: Italy
- Region: Veneto
- Province: Vicenza (VI)
- Frazioni: Montemezzo, Peschiera dei Muzzi, San Daniele, Sovizzo Colle, Tavernelle, Vigo

Government
  - Mayor: Paolo Garbin (Lista civica)

Area
  - Total: 15 km^{2} (5.8 sq mi)
- Elevation: 44 m (144 ft)

Population (31 December 2014)
  - Total: 7,388
  - Density: 490/km^{2} (1,300/sq mi)
- Demonym: Sovizzesi
- Time zone: UTC+1 (CET)
  - Summer (DST): UTC+2 (CEST)
- Postal code: 36050
- Dialing code: 0444
- ISTAT code: 024103
- Patron saint: Santa Maria Assunta
- Saint day: 15 August
- Website: Official website

Sovizzo is an Italian comune of 7,388 inhabitants in the province of Vicenza, Veneto, Italy. It is north of SR11 and located approximately 10.5 km from the regional capital of Vicenza.

== History ==
The first settlements in the area that is now the comune of Sovizzo date back to Neolithic times. Later, the Lombards inhabited the area, of which traces can still be seen today in archeological sites throughout the area.

During the Middle Ages, the area belonged to the Bishop of Vicenza, and was ceded to the local cathedral chapter in the 13th century. Throughout history, the comune has followed the fortunes of nearby Vicenza.

== Monuments and places of interest ==
In the comune and in its vicinity there are buildings of historical interest, such as Villa Bissari Curti, dating back to the 16th century, the Villa Marzotto Schiavo and the Villa Civena-Vencato, as well as the ancient chapel of the Madonna of Carmine in the frazione of San Daniele, as well as the chapel of Saint Raparata in the frazione of Vigo.

== Music ==
There are two local musical bands: the G. Rossini band and the instrumental A. Pedrollo Band di Sovizzo Colle; the latter is also noted for its concerts. The band Radio Sboro is also originally from Sovizzo.

== Sport ==
The main football team in the city is A.S.D. Sovizzo Calcio, which plays in the First Category of Veneto Group C.

== Administration ==
The current mayor of the comune is Marilisa Munari.

== People linked to Sovizzo ==
- Diego Fortuna, discus thrower for the Italian national team
- Vincenza Pasini (Sovizzo, 1356 – Vicenza, 1431), prophet
- Tom Perry (Sovizzo, 1960), alpine skier

== Sources ==
- (Google Maps)
