= Julien Van Muysen =

Belgian boxer

Personal information
- Nationality: Belgian
- Born: 9 May 1890 Anderlecht, Belgium
- Died: Unknown

Sport
- Sport: Boxing

Julien Van Muysen (born 9 May 1890, date of death unknown) was a Belgian boxer. He competed in the men's lightweight event at the 1920 Summer Olympics.
