= Marcel Gobillot =

French cyclist

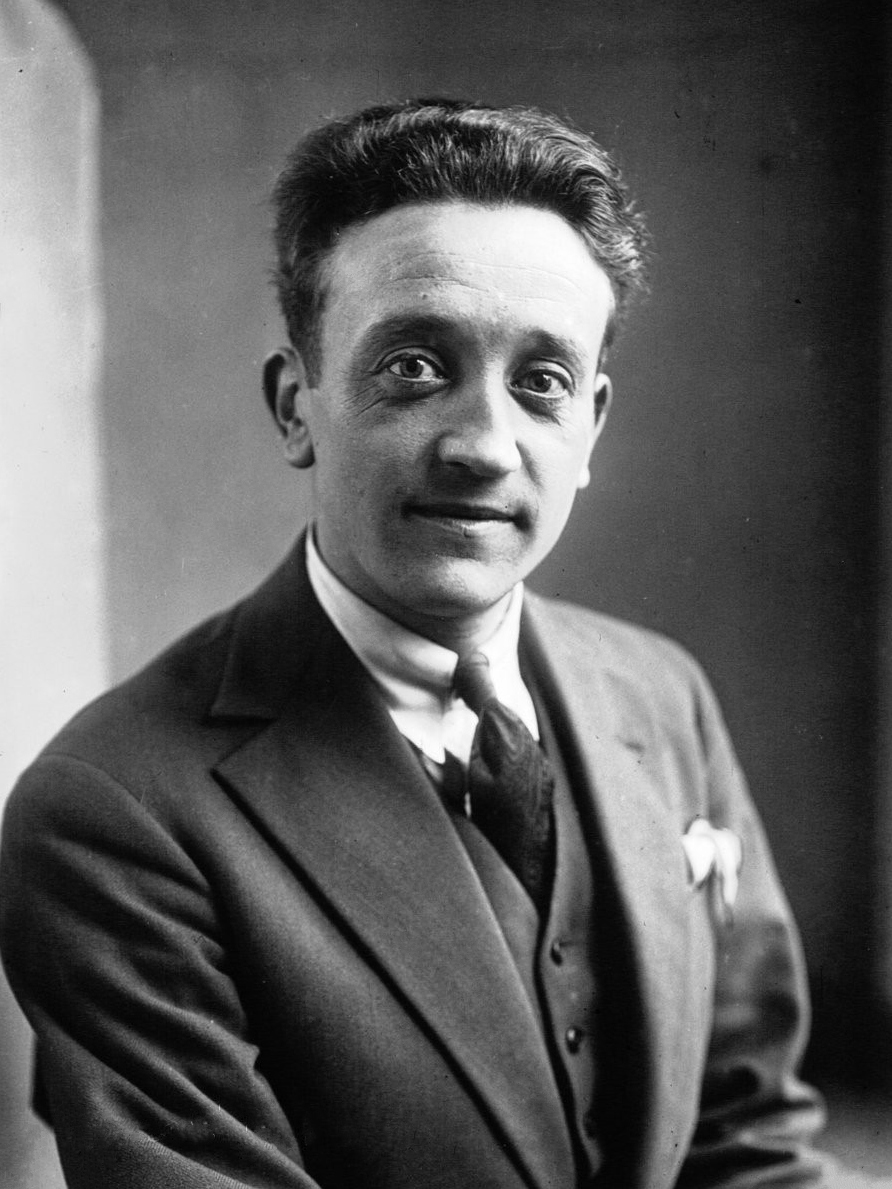
- Marcel Gobillot in 1926

Personal information
- Born: 3 January 1900 Paris, France
- Died: 12 January 1981 (aged 81) Montreuil, Seine-Saint-Denis, France

Sport
- Sport: Cycling
Medal record
Representing France
Olympic Games
Gold medal – first place	1920 Antwerp	Team time trial

Marcel Gobillot (French: [maʁsɛl ɡobijo]; 3 January 1900 – 12 January 1981) was a French cyclist who competed in the road race at the 1920 Summer Olympics. He finished 14th individually and won a gold medal with the French time trial team. He placed ninth at the 1921 UCI Road World Championships.

In 1922, he turned professional and rode the 1926 Tour de France. He retired in 1931.
