= Verner Bonde =

Danish fencer

Personal information
- Born: 8 May 1887 Syddanmark, Denmark
- Died: 28 June 1976 (aged 89) Syddanmark, Denmark

Sport
- Sport: Fencing

Verner Bonde (8 May 1887 – 28 June 1976) was a Danish fencer. He competed in the individual foil and team sabre events at the 1920 Summer Olympics.
