= Achille Souchard =

French cyclist

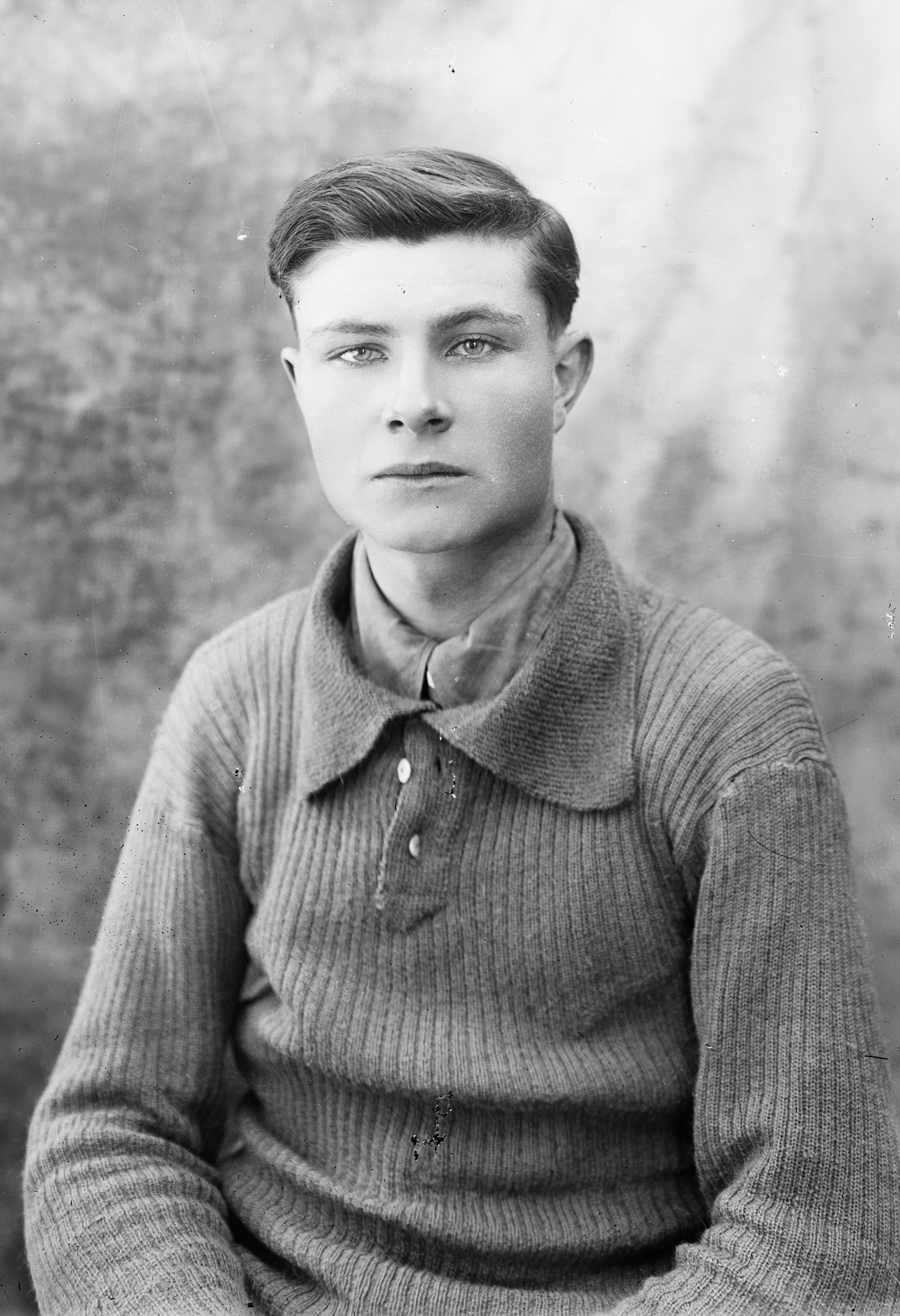
- Achille Souchard in 1920

Personal information
- Born: 17 May 1900 Le Mans, France
- Died: 20 September 1976 (aged 76) Paris, France

Sport
- Sport: Cycling
Medal record
Representing France
Olympic Games
Gold medal – first place	1920 Antwerp	Team time trial

Alphonse Achille Souchard (17 May 1900 – 20 September 1976) was a French cyclist who competed in the road race at the 1920 Summer Olympics. He finished tenth individually and won a gold medal in the team time trial.

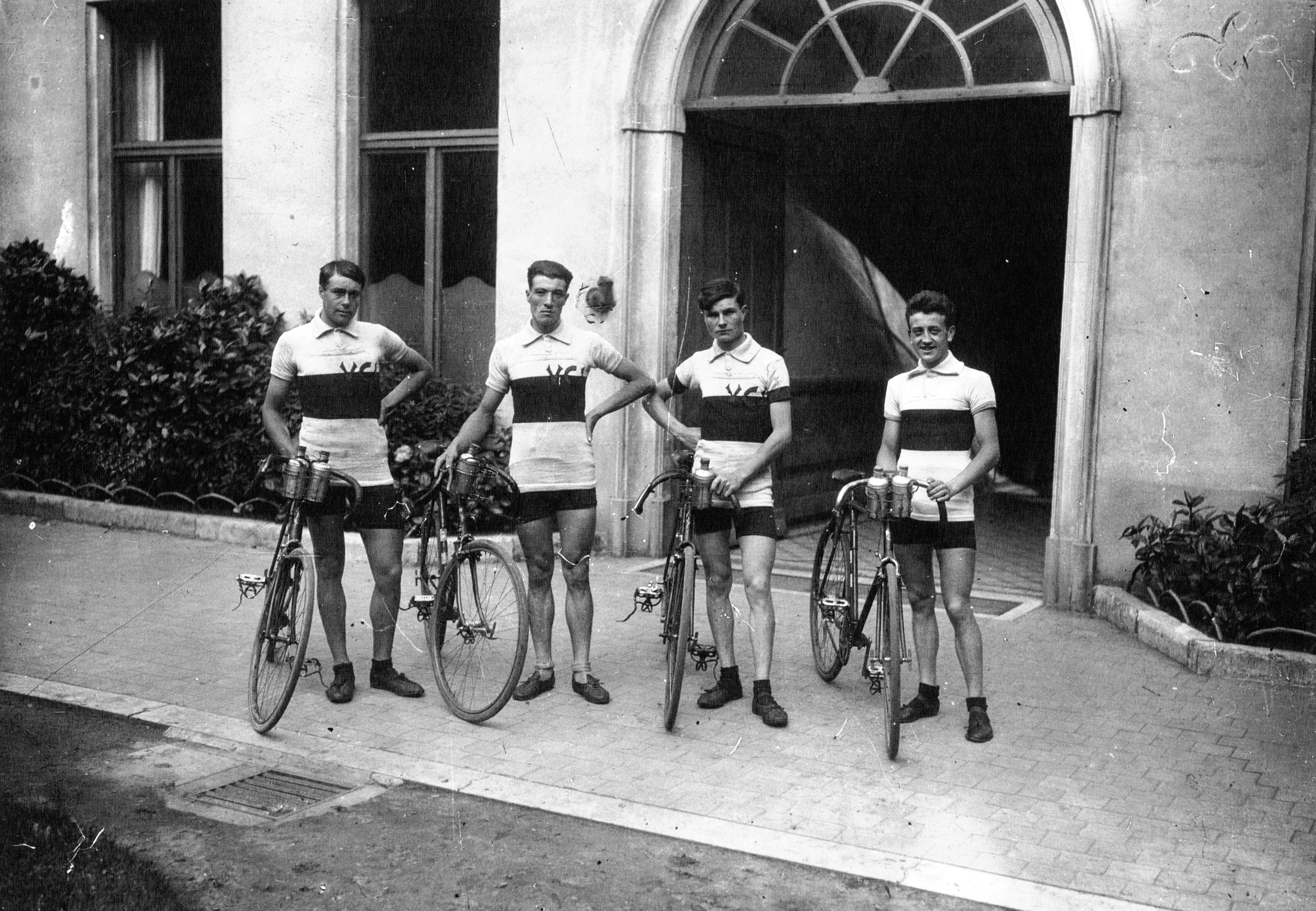
1920 Olympic Games – Road Cycling

After winning several amateur races in 1922–23, including the French Road Championships, he turned professional, and won the national again title in 1925 and 1926. He rode the 1924 Tour de France, but did not finish.
