= Johan Skjoldager =

Modern pentathlete

Personal information
- Born: 26 August 1894 Aalborg, Denmark
- Died: 15 November 1969 (aged 75) Copenhagen, Denmark

Sport
- Sport: Modern pentathlon

Johan Skjoldager (26 August 1894 – 15 November 1969) was a Danish modern pentathlete. He competed at the 1920 Summer Olympics.
