= Gotfred Johansen =

Danish boxer (1895–1978)

Olympic medal record

Men's Boxing
Silver medal – second place	1920 Antwerp	Lightweight

Gotfred Svend Kristian Johansen (4 May 1895 – 2 February 1978) was a Danish lightweight professional boxer who competed in the 1920s. He was born in Copenhagen and died in Egebæksvang, Helsingør Municipality. He was the father of Eigil Johansen. Johansen won a silver medal in lightweight boxing at the 1920 Summer Olympics, losing to Samuel Mosberg in the final.

He represented the club IF Sparta and won the Danish amateur championship in lightweight 4 times, in 1916, 1918, 1919, and 1910.

His son Eigil Johansen competed in wrestling at the 1952 Olympics. Gotfred Johansen worked as a store clerk.

== 1920 Olympic results ==
Below is the record of Gotfred Johansen, a Danish lightweight boxer who competed at the 1920 Antwerp Olympics:

- Round of 16: defeated Jean Nays (Belgium)
- Quarterfinal: defeated Frank Cassidy (United States)
- Semifinal: defeated Clarence Newton (Canada)
- Final: lost to Samuel Mosberg (United States); was awarded silver medal
