= Ejner Augsburg =

Danish modern pentathlete (1892–1971)

Personal information
- Born: 26 April 1892 Roskilde, Denmark
- Died: 26 October 1971 (aged 79) Copenhagen, Denmark

Sport
- Sport: Modern pentathlon

Ejner Augsburg (26 April 1892 – 26 October 1971) was a Danish modern pentathlete. He competed at the 1920 Summer Olympics.
