= Vilhelm Jørgensen =

Danish footballer (1897–1967

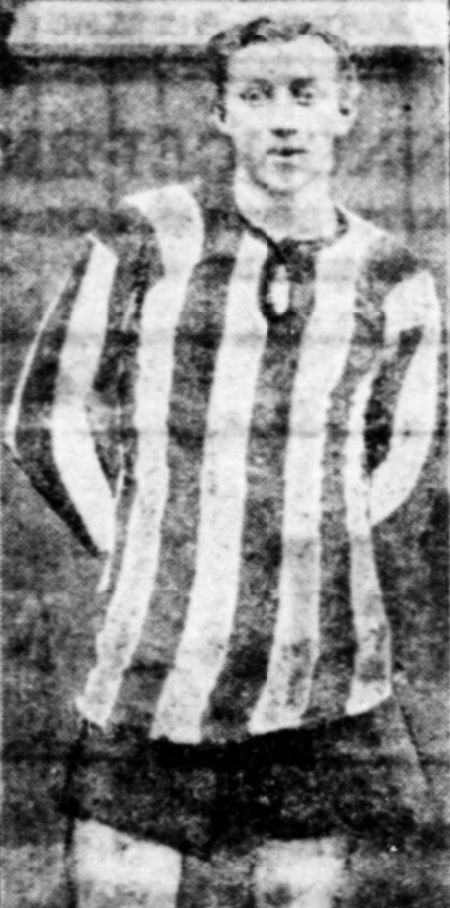
- Jørgensen with B1903 in 1916

Personal information
- Date of birth: 27 May 1897
- Date of death: 3 October 1967 (aged 70)
- Position: Defender

Youth career
- 1911–1913: Boldklubben 1903

Senior career*
Years	Team	Apps	(Gls)
1913–1930	Boldklubben 1903		

International career
1917–1923	Denmark	15	(0)
- * Club domestic league appearances and goals

Vilhelm Jørgensen (27 May 1897 – 3 October 1967) was a Danish footballer who played as a defender for Boldklubben 1903 and the Danish national football team. He was the older brother of B1903 teammate Viggo Jørgensen, who worked with him for piano manufacturer Søren Jensen off the pitch.

== Club career ==
Jørgensen made his senior debut for B1903 in 1913, after playing for the club's youth teams. He won Danish football championships in 1920, 1914, and 1926.

== International career ==
Jørgensen made his international debut on 3 June 1917 against Sweden. He was named to the Danish squad for the 1920 Olympic Football Tournament, but did not play in Denmark's only match, a first-round defeat to Spain. Jørgensen would go on to make 15 appearances for Denmark, only appearing in friendly games. His final match for his country came on 17 June 1923 against Switzerland.
