= Christian Juhl (gymnast) =

Danish artistic gymnast

- Full name: Christian Willumsen Juhl
- Born: 29 April 1898 Esbjerg, Denmark
- Died: 27 September 1962 (aged 64) Esbjerg, Denmark

Gymnastics career
- Discipline: Men's artistic gymnastics
- Country represented: Denmark
Medal record
Men's artistic gymnastics
Representing Denmark
Olympic Games
Gold medal – first place	1920 Antwerp	Team, free system

Christian Willumsen Juhl (29 April 1898 in Esbjerg, Denmark – 27 September 1962 in Esbjerg, Denmark) was a Danish gymnast who competed in the 1920 Summer Olympics. He was part of the Danish team, which was able to win the gold medal in the gymnastics men's team, free system event in 1920.
