= August Nogara =

American cyclist

Personal information
- Born: February 28, 1896 Sovizzo, Italy
- Died: June 28, 1984 (aged 88) Broad Brook, Connecticut, United States

Cycling career
- Sport: Cycling

August Nogara (February 28, 1896 – June 28, 1984) was an American cyclist. He competed in two events at the 1920 Summer Olympics. In the road race, he crashed after hitting a rooster, but managed to finish. Earlier, he fought in World War I.
