= Harry Stenqvist =

Swedish cyclist

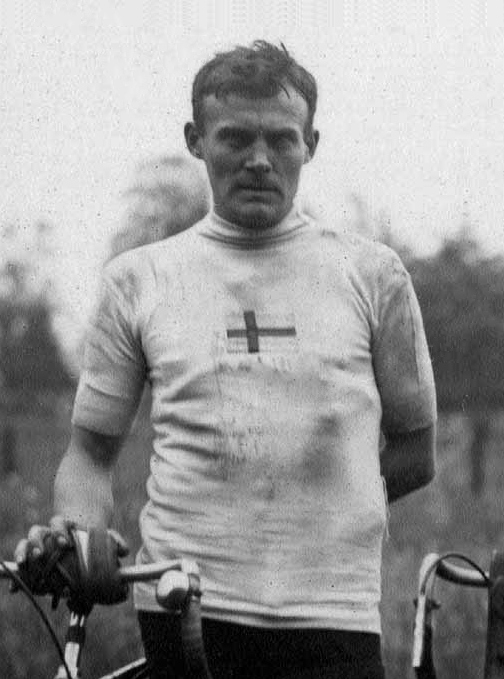
- Stenqvist at the 1920 Olympics

Personal information
- Born: 25 December 1893 Chicago, United States
- Died: 9 December 1968 (aged 74) Örebro, Sweden

Sport
- Sport: Cycling
- Event: Road
- Club: CK Uni, Storvreta, Uppsala
Medal record
Representing Sweden
Olympic Games
Gold medal – first place	1920 Antwerp	Individual time trial
Silver medal – second place	1920 Antwerp	Team time trial

Erik Harry Stenqvist (25 December 1893 – 9 December 1968) was a Swedish road racing cyclist. Stenqvist competed in the 175 km road race at the 1920 Summer Olympics and won an individual gold and team silver medals.

Stenqvist was born in the United States to Swedish parents and later moved to Sweden, where he won national titles in the team (1912–1915) and individual events (10 km in 1915 and 1920 and 100 km in 1920). He was selected for the 1912 Stockholm Olympics, but only as a substitute. In 1916, his amateur status was revoked by the Swedish Cycling Federation, but later restored after a successful appeal. At the 1920 Olympics, Stenqvist was initially declared a bronze medalist, but then promoted to first place after subtracting the 4 minutes he had to wait at a railroad crossing.
