= Jens Jensen (footballer) =

Danish footballer (1890-1957)

Personal information
- Date of birth: 15 November 1890
- Place of birth: Veksø, Denmark
- Date of death: 16 November 1957 (aged 67)
- Place of death: Copenhagen, Denmark

International career
Years	Team	Apps	(Gls)
- Denmark

Jens Jensen (15 November 1890 – 16 November 1957) was a Danish footballer. He played in one match for the Denmark national football team in 1920.
