= Jean Neys =

Belgian boxer

Alphonse Neys
Personal information
- Nationality: Belgian
- Born: 15 March 1899 Leuven, Belgium
- Died: 1973 (aged 73–74)

Sport
- Sport: Boxing

Alphonse Neys (15 March 1899 – 1973) was a Belgian boxer. He competed in the men's lightweight event at the 1920 Summer Olympics.
