= Viggo Jørgensen =

Danish footballer (1899–1986)

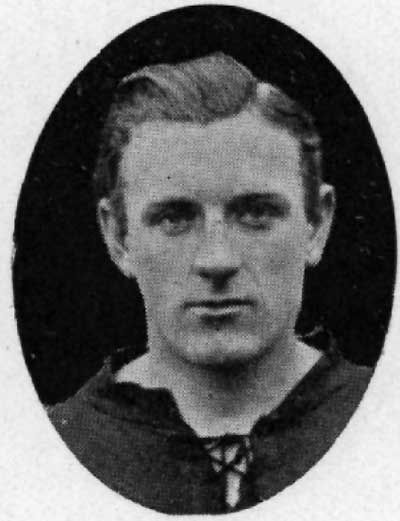
- Jørgensen circa 1920

Personal information
- Date of birth: 8 August 1899
- Date of death: 21 May 1986 (aged 86)
- Position: Inside forward

Senior career*
Years	Team	Apps	(Gls)
1916–1932	Boldklubben 1903	42	(17)

International career
1920–1926	Denmark	13	(6)
Medal record
Men's Football
Representing Denmark
Nordic Football Championship
Winner	1924–28
- * Club domestic league appearances and goals as of 15 July 1920

Viggo Jørgensen (8 August 1899 – 21 May 1986) was a Danish footballer who played as an inside forward for Boldklubben 1903 and the Danish national football team. He represented Denmark in the men's football tournament at the 1920 Summer Olympics. He was the brother of fellow 1903 player Vilhelm Jørgensen. Playing at a time when Danish domestic football was entirely amateur, Jørgensen was employed by piano manufacturer Søren Jensen off the pitch.

== Club career ==
Jørgensen played club football for Boldklubben 1903 in Copenhagen from 1916 to 1932. During his career with the team, he won three Danish championships.

=== 1916/17: Rookie campaign ===
In his rookie season, Jørgensen scored his first-ever senior goal on 17 September 1916 in a 4–2 victory over B93. He scored again the following week in a 5–0 rout of Østerbros in the KBU Cup. Jørgensen recorded his first career brace against Akademisk on 19 November as part of a 6–1 victory, with his second goal coming from the penalty spot. Jørgensen was one of five 1903 players to represent the city in a match against Sweden, scoring a goal as the combination side defeated the Swedes 3–0. Boldklubben 1903 finished the 1916/17 season fourth in the Copenhagen section, failing to qualify for the final round. (Note: At the time, the winners and runners up of the Copenhagen league qualified to play the winner of the provincial tournament, with the Copenhagen winners receiving a first-round bye.) However, Jørgensen recorded another brace on the final day of the season, as 1903 ended their campaign with a 5–2 victory against B93.

=== 1917 to 1919: Establishing himself ===
The 1917/18 season opened strongly in preseason, as Jørgensen scored nine goals in four games against Østerbros (two) and Boldklubben Velo (three) in a preseason tournament; 1903 placed first after defeating Østerbros 4–0 and Velo 10–1. The third preseason game was a 2–1 victory against a combination side from Malmö, composed of players from Enighet, Sparta, and Malmö FF, in which Jørgensen scored both of 1903's goals. He recorded his fourth game in a row with two goals or better in 1903's final preseason game, leading his side to a 3–2 victory over KB.

The regular season came with an auspicious start as well. Jørgensen was on target for the fifth game in a row, scoring once in 1903's season opener on 9 September, a 4–2 KBU Cup win over KFUM. He did not open his league account until 21 October, scoring in another 4–2 victory against Akademisk. Jørgensen registered his second cup goal of the season from the penalty spot the following week against B93 as 1903 won 4–0. In December, Jørgensen won his first career silverware, as 1903 defeated Østerbros 3–2 after extra time to win the 1917 KBU Cup. Jørgensen scored twice against Velo on 15 April, (Note: Danish football at the time took an extended winter break, from December to March.) once from the spot, and then picked up another brace in an exhibition match on 23 June against Odense. 1903 once again finished the season in fourth place, but Jørgensen had established himself as a quickly emerging talent.

1918/19 was quieter, although a decent amount of his season was lost due to injury. Jørgensen's first goal of the season came in a 3–1 league win over Østerbros on 8 September. He would have to wait until 16 May for his second, as part of a 2–0 win representing the city of Copenhagen against a similar team from Gothenburg. 1903 would finish fifth, well off the pace of champions Akademisk.

=== 1919/20: First Danish championship ===
The season began with Jørgensen scoring twice in another summer tournament victory as 1903 defeated Østerbros 7–0 in the final. He scored his first league goal on 7 September, with 1903 drawing B93 1–1. His next goal came when he scored the fourth and final 1903 goal in a 4–2 win to secure his second career KBU Cup. No additional league goals were to come before the winter break, however.

The second half of the season featured many more goals. Jørgensen's second league goal of the season came on 11 April against KB. The goal was part of 1903 inflicting KB's first defeat of the season by a score of 2–1. He scored again the following week in a defeat to Akademisk. A couple of weeks after that, Jørgensen scored as part of a 6–2 victory over Østerbros followed by the opener in a 5–0 win against KFUM. The win against KFUM secured 1903 the Copenhagen Series title for the first time, and Jørgensen's side qualified to play for the season's Danish championship. This also meant that, as 1903 were also the season's KBU Cup champions, Jørgensen was part of the fourth team in Copenhagen history to win a double, and the first not named Kjøbenhavns Boldklub.

Although he did not score in the game, Jørgensen played in B1903's 2–0 victory over Nykøbing to seal the 1920 national title.

== International career ==
Jørgensen made his first appearance for Denmark on 28 August 1920, in a 1–0 first round loss to eventual runners-up Spain at the 1920 Summer Olympics in Belgium. He would go on to make 12 more appearances for his country, including at the 1924–28 Nordic Football Championship, which was won by Denmark. Jørgensen's first international goal came on 30 September 1923 in an international friendly against Norway, scoring the winning goal in a 2–1 victory following Norwegian goalkeeper Hugo Hofstad's poor clearance. He scored again on 14 October in a friendly against Sweden, opening the scoring on 20 minutes before providing an assist to Karl Wilhelmsen in the 87th minute of a 3–1 victory. Jørgensen scored his first and only international hat-trick in a 4–1 friendly victory over Netherlands in June 1926.
