= Pieter Kloppenburg =

Dutch cyclist

Personal information
- Born: 18 September 1896 Amsterdam, Netherlands
- Died: 21 January 1972 (aged 75) Amsterdam, Netherlands

Cycling career
- Sport: Cycling

Pieter Kloppenburg (18 September 1896 – 21 January 1972) was a Dutch cyclist. He competed in two events at the 1920 Summer Olympics.

== See also ==
- List of Dutch Olympic cyclists
