= Herbert McDonald (cyclist) =

Canadian cyclist

Herbert Macdonald
Personal information
- Born: 9 November 1885 Collingwood, Ontario, Canada
- Died: 16 March 1962 (aged 77) Toronto, Ontario, Canada

Cycling career
- Sport: Cycling

Herbert Macdonald (9 November 1885 – 16 March 1962) was a Canadian cyclist who competed in five events at the 1920 Summer Olympics.
