= Paul Henrichsen =

Norwegian cyclist

Personal information
- Born: 2 September 1893 Glemmen, Norway
- Died: 5 August 1962 (aged 68) Frogn, Norway

Cycling career
- Sport: Cycling

Paul Henrichsen (2 September 1893 – 5 August 1962) was a Norwegian cyclist. He competed in two events at the 1912 Summer Olympics and two events at the 1920 Summer Olympics.
