= James Freeman (cyclist) =

American cyclist

Personal information
- Born: February 20, 1891 Little Rock, Arkansas, United States
- Died: July 16, 1951 (aged 60) St. Louis, Missouri, United States

Cycling career
- Sport: Cycling

James Freeman (February 20, 1891 – July 16, 1951) was an American cyclist. He competed in two events at the 1920 Summer Olympics.
