= William Genders =

British cyclist

Personal information
- Born: 5 January 1890 Sutton Coldfield, England
- Died: 7 February 1971 (aged 81) Christies Beach, South Australia, Australia

Cycling career
- Sport: Cycling

William Genders (5 January 1890 – 7 February 1971) was a British cyclist. He competed in two events at the 1920 Summer Olympics. Genders served in Belgium with the Royal Army Service Corps during the First World War.
