= Nicolaas de Jong =

Dutch cyclist

Personal information
- Born: 10 June 1887 Sloten, Netherlands
- Died: 14 July 1966 (aged 79) Apeldoorn, Netherlands

Cycling career
- Sport: Cycling

Nicolaas de Jong (10 June 1887 – 14 July 1966) was a Dutch cyclist. He competed in two events at the 1920 Summer Olympics.

== See also ==
- List of Dutch Olympic cyclists
