= Harry Martin (cyclist) =

Canadian cyclist

Personal information
- Born: 1889 Vienna, Austria
- Died: 22 July 1922 (aged 32–33) Toronto, Canada

Cycling career
- Sport: Cycling

Harry Percy Martin (1889 – 22 July 1922) was a Canadian cyclist. He competed in two events at the 1920 Summer Olympics.
