= Clarence Newton =

Canadian boxer

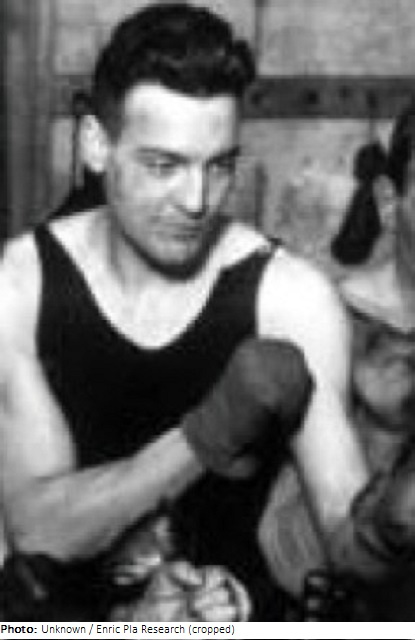
Olympic medal record

Men's Boxing

Representing Canada
Bronze medal – third place	1920 Antwerp	Lightweight

Clarence "Chris" Newton (February 3, 1899 in Toronto – October 23, 1979) was a Canadian lightweight boxer who was active during the 1920s. He was affiliated with Riverside Athletic Club in Toronto. He won the bronze medal at the 1920 Summer Olympics in Antwerp, Belgium.

== 1920 Olympic results ==
Below are the results of Clarence Newton, a Canadian lightweight boxer who competed at the 1920 Antwerp Olympics:

- Round of 16: defeated Johan Jensen (Denmark)
- Quarterfinal: defeated Johan Saeterhaug (Norway)
- Semifinal: lost to Gotfred Johansen (Denmark)
- Bronze Medal Bout: defeated Richard Beland (South Africa)

== Professional career ==
From 1920 to 1929, Newton fought professionally in Canada and the United States 66 times, earning the alias "Old Warrior". A highlight of his professional career came on February 21, 1927, when he defeated Chris Graham by way of knockout to become the Canadian lightweight champion.
