= Albert Wyckmans =

Belgian cyclist

Personal information
- Born: 12 September 1897 Antwerp, Belgium
- Died: 20 June 1995 (aged 97) Antwerp, Belgium

Cycling career
- Sport: Cycling
Medal record
Men's road bicycle racing
Representing Belgium
Olympic Games
Bronze medal – third place	1920 Antwerp	Team road race

Albert Wyckmans (12 September 1897 – 20 June 1995) was a Belgian cyclist. He won the bronze medal in the Team road race in the 1920 Summer Olympics.
