= Dante Guindani =

Italian cyclist

Personal information
- Born: 11 June 1899 Cremona, Italy
- Died: 1 February 1929 (aged 29)

Cycling career
- Sport: Cycling

Dante Guindani (11 June 1899 – 1 February 1929) was an Italian cyclist. He competed in two events at the 1920 Summer Olympics.
