= Helge Flatby =

Norwegian cyclist

Personal information
- Born: 8 December 1894 Oslo, Norway
- Died: 18 July 1971 (aged 76) Oslo, Norway

Cycling career
- Sport: Cycling

Helge Flatby (8 December 1894 – 18 July 1971) was a Norwegian cyclist. He competed in two events at the 1920 Summer Olympics.

Helge was 25 when he competed in the 1920 summer Olympics which was held at Antwerpian, he competed as a cyclist. He had trained hard and got ranked 28th in the men's individual road race and he ranked 8th in the men's team road race.
