= František Kundert =

Czech cyclist

Personal information
- Born: 28 July 1891 Žižkov, Austria-Hungary
- Died: 27 February 1957 (aged 65)

Cycling career
- Sport: Cycling

František Kundert (28 July 1891 – 27 February 1957) was a cyclist. He competed for Bohemia at the 1912 Summer Olympics and for Czechoslovakia at the 1920 and 1924 Summer Olympics.
