= Thorstein Stryken =

Norwegian cyclist

Personal information
- Born: 3 December 1900 Jessheim, Norway
- Died: 21 September 1965 (aged 64) Oslo, Norway

Cycling career
- Sport: Cycling

Thorstein Stryken (3 December 1900 – 21 September 1965) was a Norwegian cyclist. He competed in two events at the 1920 Summer Olympics.
