= Olaf Nygaard =

Norwegian cyclist

Personal information
- Born: 5 September 1894 Oslo, Norway
- Died: 1 April 1978 (aged 83) Oslo, Norway

Cycling career
- Sport: Cycling

Olaf Nygaard (5 September 1894 – 1 April 1978) was a Norwegian cyclist. He competed in two events at the 1920 Summer Olympics.
