= Bohumil Rameš =

Czech cyclist

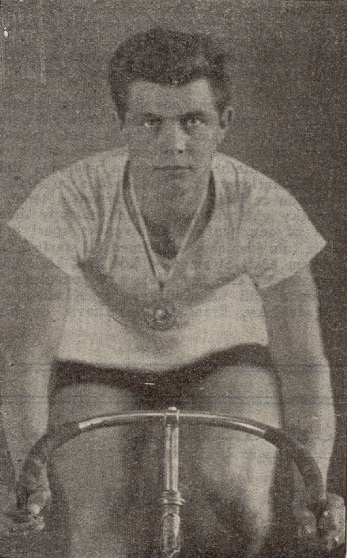
- Rameš in 1922

Personal information
- Born: 4 March 1895 Mělník, Austria-Hungary
- Died: 26 November 1974 (aged 79) Mělník, Czechoslovakia

Cycling career
- Sport: Cycling

Bohumil Rameš (4 March 1895 – 26 November 1974) was a Czech cyclist. He competed for Bohemia at the 1912 Summer Olympics and for Czechoslovakia at the 1920 Summer Olympics.
