= Arie van der Stel =

Dutch cyclist

Personal information
- Born: 24 April 1894 The Hague, Netherlands
- Died: 31 January 1986 (aged 91) The Hague, Netherlands

Cycling career
- Sport: Cycling

Arie Gerrit van der Stel (24 April 1894 – 31 January 1986) was a Dutch cyclist. He competed in three events at the 1920 Summer Olympics.

Additional results from his three events at the 1920 Antwerp Games are listed on the Olympedia profile (see https://www.olympedia.org/athletes/16984).

== See also ==
- List of Dutch Olympic cyclists
