= Camillo Arduino =

Italian cyclist

Personal information
- Born: 22 March 1896 Turin, Italy
- Died: 23 July 1988 (aged 92) Turin, Italy

Cycling career
- Sport: Cycling

Camillo Arduino (22 March 1896 – 23 July 1988) was an Italian cyclist. He competed in two events at the 1920 Summer Olympics.
