= Fernand Canteloube =

French cyclist (1900–1976)

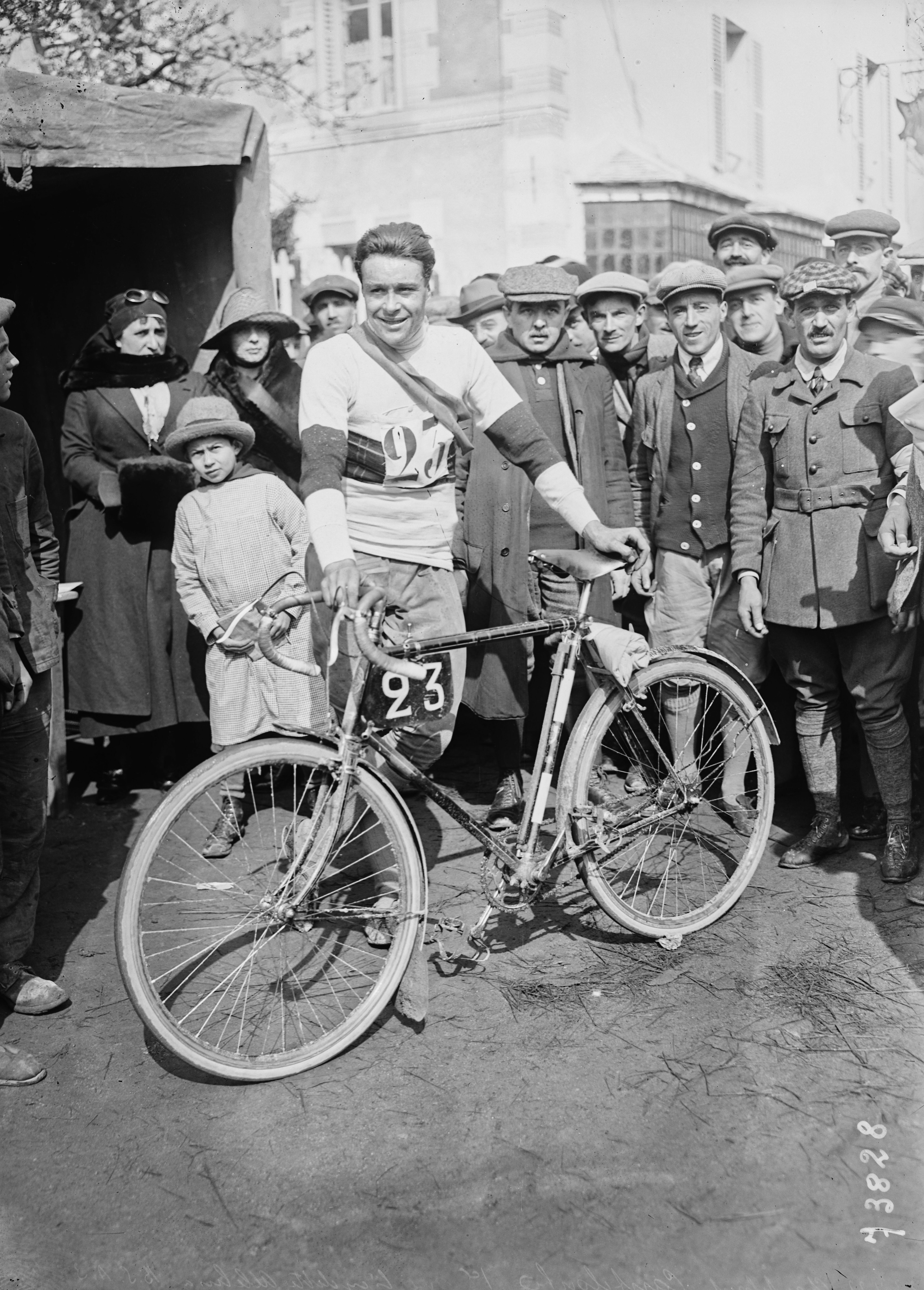
- Fernand Canteloube in 1922

Personal information
- Born: 3 August 1900 Aubervilliers, France
- Died: 16 July 1976 (aged 75) Créteil, France

Sport
- Sport: Cycling
Medal record
Representing France
Olympic Games
Gold medal – first place	1920 Antwerp	Road race team
Bronze medal – third place	1920 Antwerp	Road race individual

Fernand Canteloube (3 August 1900 – 16 July 1976) was a French cyclist who competed in the road race at the 1920 Summer Olympics. He won a team gold and an individual bronze medal. He finished fourth at the 1921 UCI Road World Championships.
