= Christian Johansen =

Danish cyclist

Personal information
- Full name: Christian Johansen

Cycling career
- Sport: Cycling

Christian Johansen was a Danish cyclist. He competed in two events at the 1920 Summer Olympics.
