= Ahrensborg Clausen =

Danish cyclist

Ahrensborg Claussen
Personal information
- Full name: Georg Frederik Ahrensborg Clausen
- Born: 20 June 1895 Frederiksberg, Denmark
- Died: 4 July 1967 (aged 72) Frederiksberg, Denmark

Cycling career
- Sport: Cycling

Ahrensborg Claussen (20 June 1895 – 4 July 1967) was a Danish cyclist. He competed at the 1920 and the 1924 Summer Olympics.
