= Kristian Frisch =

Danish cyclist

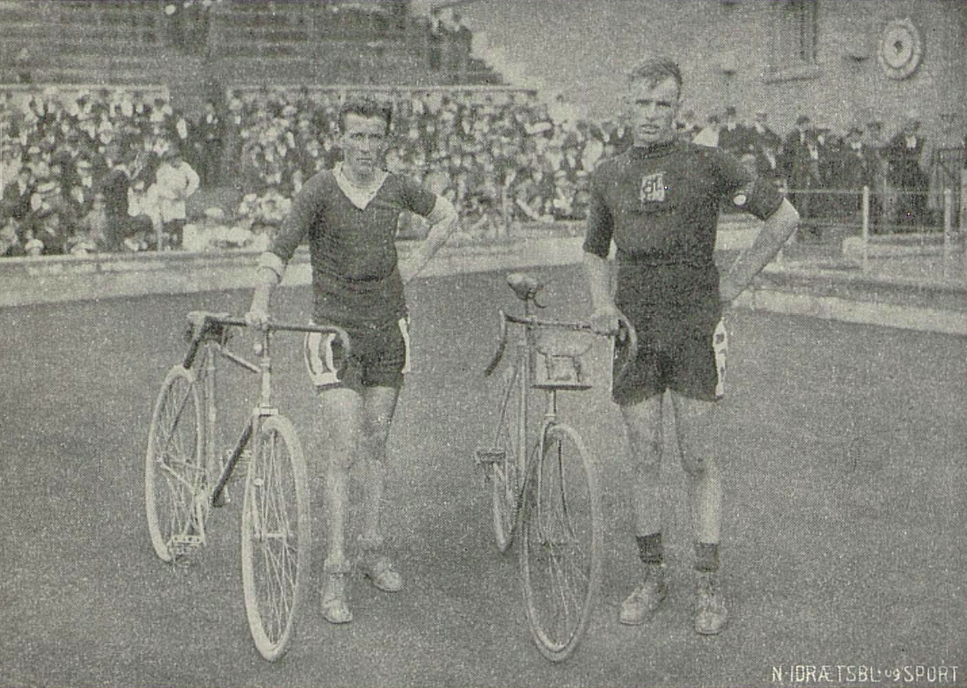
- Frisch (left) wins Mälaren runt in 1917

Personal information
- Born: 8 July 1891 Copenhagen, Denmark
- Died: 7 December 1954 (aged 63) Copenhagen, Denmark

Cycling career
- Sport: Cycling

Kristian Frisch (8 July 1891 – 7 December 1954) was a Danish cyclist. He competed in two events at the 1920 Summer Olympics.
