= John Otto (cyclist) =

American cyclist

Personal information
- Born: November 4, 1900 Newark, New Jersey, United States
- Died: April 1966 Irvington, New Jersey, United States

Cycling career
- Sport: Cycling

John Otto (November 4, 1900 – April 1966) was an American cyclist. He competed in two events at the 1920 Summer Olympics.
