= Arnold Lundgren =

Danish cyclist (1899–1979)

Personal information
- Full name: Johan Oscar Arnold Lundgren
- Born: 5 January 1899 Copenhagen, Denmark
- Died: 21 June 1979 (aged 80) Copenhagen, Denmark

Cycling career
- Sport: Cycling

Arnold Lundgren (5 January 1899 – 21 June 1979) was a Danish cyclist. He competed in two events at the 1920 Summer Olympics.
