= Samuel Mosberg =

American boxer (1896–1967)

Sam Mosberg or Mossberg
- Mosberg in early career

Personal information
- Nationality: American
- Born: Samuel A. Mosberg (Note: Mossberg in 1920's newspapers); June 14, 1896 Cisleithania, Austro-Hungarian Empire (nowadays Austria) (Note: Grew up on New York City's East side)
- Died: August 30, 1967 (aged 71) Brooklyn, New York
- Height: 5 ft 6 in (1.68 m)
- Weight: Lightweight

Boxing career
- Stance: Orthodox

Boxing record
- Total fights: 29; Partial record from BoxRec
- Wins: 16; Includes newspaper wins
- Win by KO: 3
- Losses: 9
- Draws: 4
Medal record
Men's boxing
Representing the United States
Olympic Games
Gold medal – first place	1920 Antwerp	Lightweight

Samuel A. Mossberg or Mosberg (June 14, 1896 – August 30, 1967) was an American lightweight professional boxer who competed in the early 1920s. He was managed by Billy Gibson and Jack Bulger for most of his professional career.

== Amateur career ==
Mosberg was born in Cisleithania (nowadays Austria) on June 14, 1896, but grew up on New York City's East side, a largely Jewish section. He began his prolific amateur boxing career in 1912 at age 16 with New York's Pastime Athletic Club and gained vast experience, eventually fighting an impressive 250 amateur fights.

=== WWI Navy boxer ===
Boxing for the navy in World War I, Mosberg won the lightweight championship for his base, the Newport Naval Station at Newport, Rhode, Island, where he continued his amateur boxing career against navy fighters. He simultaneously worked as a navy boxing instructor, as did his friend boxer Mel Coogan, before he was discharged and returned to his civilian amateur career. His patriotic service in World War I and subsequent training and participation in the Olympics delayed his entry into boxing's professional ranks until he reached the age of twenty four.

=== Olympic gold medalist, 1920 ===
Mosberg did not perform well enough in the Olympic trials in Boston to be placed on the two-person American lightweight boxing team, but was picked as an alternate and sailed to the Olympics in Antwerp, Belgium in August 1920. He was selected for the team when he defeated a higher-ranking team member, black boxer Ben Pontieu, in a match on the boat ride. Mosberg also claimed to have beaten Pontieu earlier that year in an Eastern elimination tournament prior to the trials, and admired his skills and technique. In 1952, he claimed Pontieu was a better boxer than those he would later meet in the Olympics. The New York Age told a different version of Pontieu's Olympic trials experience, but omitted that Mosberg had beaten Pontieu prior to the Olympics.

With an exceptional performance in his Olympic showing on August 23, 1920, Mosberg knocked out his Semi-Final competitor, rugged South African, Richard Beland, only seconds into the first round, establishing what might have been an Olympic record at the time for fastest knockout. Not long after the opening bell, Mosberg feinted, and connected with a powerful hook to Beland's chin that sent his opponent to the canvas for the count and ended the bout. In his Olympic Finals match on August 24, he defeated Danish boxer Gottfred Johansen, and claimed the gold medal. In one of his proudest moments, he was presented with his medal by King Albert of Belgium in an Olympic ceremony.

His Olympic coach, Spike Webb, the long serving boxing coach for the US Olympics, and Naval Academy's teams, commented once that Mosberg was the greatest Olympic champion he had ever coached.

== Professional career ==
He turned professional after the Olympics, competing in 57 professional fights. Mosberg was outpointed by the skilled, and highly rated lightweights Mel Coogan, and Frankie Conifrey. He lost to powerful Philadelphia Jewish lightweight Harry (Kid) Brown, though may have beaten him in their first bout. He was later knocked out by the powerful southpaw and World lightweight contender, Eddie Fitzsimmons.

In his first professional match, on December 7, 1920, Mosberg defeated Frank Cassidy, in a close ten-round newspaper decision of the Philadelphia Record at the Fourth Regiment Armory in New Jersey. Other newspapers wrote that Mosberg had clearly won on points scoring, but admitted the bout was close. Cassidy had the stronger punching in the bout, but Mosberg was credited with greater speed, and started off with a points lead in the first two rounds. In the closing round, Cassidy bore in to Mosberg with strong body blows, leading at least one reporter to write that the bout was a draw. Mosberg was happy to face Cassidy, who had decisioned him in the Olympic finals in Boston earlier that year. Cassidy had been a great amateur boxer who was an AAU Champion in 1918 and New York State Amateur boxing champion in 1919. But Mosberg knew Cassidy's fighting style and was willing to prove he could defeat his former Olympic rival in a final meeting. Dave Driscoll had promoted the bout, and got Mosberg $1,500 for the well-attended match. The boxing card included Mosberg's friend and future lightweight contender Mel Coogan against Jewish boxer Eddie Wallace. It also featured future light heavyweight champion Gene Tunney, the "fighting Marine". Mosberg was praised for his aggressive boxing, and claimed to have been particularly skilled in infighting in his early career. In his second bout, on the afternoon of December 25, 1920, Mosberg defeated Paul Edwards, a more experienced and proven opponent than Cassidy, in a decisive ten-round unanimous decision at the Commonwealth Sporting Club in New York. Both boxers were from New York's East Side, and the fighting was fast and furious, with Mosberg landing more blows and more telling ones than his opponent. Mosberg "made a chopping block" out of his more experienced opponent, but though he tried desperately, was unable to put him away in the later rounds, as Edwards assimilated the blows and sailed in for more. Edwards, a quality journeyman featherweight, had met Patsy Cline, Johnny Clinton, and Joe Tiplitz, but he was on the downside of his career, and had not amassed an impressive record against the contenders he had faced.

Frankie Connifrey, 1917

Facing even stiffer competition on February 5, 1921, Mosberg knocked out top lightweight contender Frankie Conifrey in the second of twelve rounds. Conifrey had dislocated his shoulder in the second after aiming a left at Mosberg that missed, and the referee had to call the bout off to allow a doctor to treat the injury. As a result, Mosberg won by technical knockout. Mosberg was matched by manager Billy Gibson, who had previously worked with lightweight champion Benny Leonard. Leonard had beaten Conifrey five years earlier. Earlier in January, 1921, Conifrey had defeated Mosberg at Madison Square Garden, the shrine of East coast boxing, in a six-round split decision.

Mosberg defeated Bostonian Frankie McManus in a fifth-round technical knockout on March 14, 1921, at the Olympia Athletic Club in Philadelphia. Had the bout been allowed to continue by the referee, Mosberg would likely have dropped McManus for the count. He had previously defeated McManus on February 28, at the Olympia in a six-round newspaper decision of the Philadelphia Inquirer, in a fast fight where he boxed before a Philadelphia audience for the first time. McManus was a prolific boxer who had met New York Jewish featherweight Eddie Wallace, lightweight contender Patsy Cline, and New York Jewish lightweight contender Lew Tendler, but had not fared well against them. Capable of power, he had knocked out at least three of his early opponents, but had fared poorly in his late career.

On June 6, 1921, Mosberg defeated Bert Spencer at the Federal League Baseball Park in Harrison, Pennsylvania, in an eight-round newspaper decision of the Pittsburgh Post and a majority of local newspapers. It was a decisive win against a well-rated contender for Mosberg. A crowd of 30,000 watched the preliminary bout at the Newark Baseball Park and would later see Benny Leonard beat Rocky Kansas. Spencer was a competent feather and lightweight who would fight top talent in his career, including world jr. lightweight champion Jack Bernstein, top rated feather and lightweight contender Benny Valgar, and world featherweight champion Johnny Dundee.

Mosberg lost to his friend, highly rated lightweight contender, Mel Coogan on August 13, 1921, before a large crowd at Long Island's Queensboro Stadium in a twelve-round points decision. Coogan, who had risen in the ranks to a well-rated lightweight contender, beat his old friend easily, though he knew his style and technique from their years of coaching navy boxers together in World War I.

In another close bout, Mosberg drew with Ray Pryel in Newark, New Jersey, on September 22, 1921, in a twelve-round newspaper decision of the Philadelphia Record in Newark, New Jersey. Pryel would fight several highly rated lightweights in his later career including Ever Hammer and Jewish boxer Joe Tiplitz, but have a spotty record against them.

In an easy win, Mosberg defeated Charley Egan on October 19, 1921, in an eight-round points decision at Brooklyn's Coney Island. On October 31, 1921, Mosberg fought a close bout with Gus Franchetti at the Olympia Athletic Club in Philadelphia, that was called a draw by the Philadelphia Public Ledger. In a rough bout, Mosberg displayed better ringcraft and scored with stronger punches, but Franchetti attacked on his own each time Mosberg built a margin on points, and managed to even the scoring by the close of the bout.

=== Bouts with Harry "Kid" Brown, 1921–1922 ===
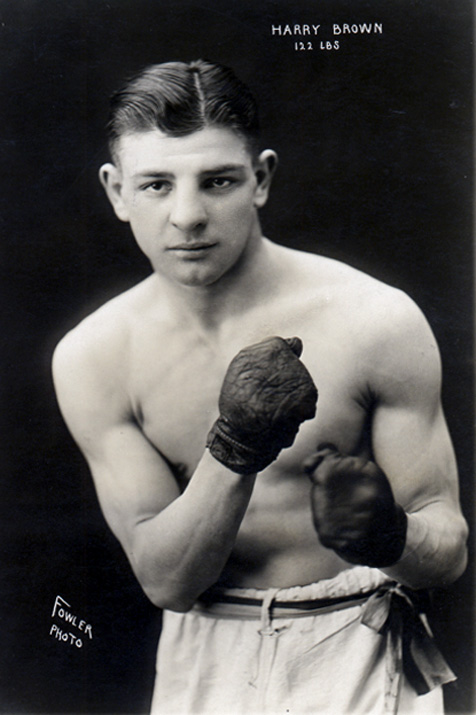
Powerful Harry Brown

On December 26, 1921, Mosberg lost to fellow Jewish boxer Harry "Kid" Brown in a close eight-round newspaper decision of three Philadelphia newspapers before a partisan crowd at the Olympic Athletic Club in Philadelphia. Brown, a native Philadelphian, was a formidable opponent with a powerful punch, an enviable record, and a deadly 30% knockout rate in his winning matches. Their bout was considered the fastest of the day, and Mosberg had to use his best defensive skills to avoid the power of his opponent. The respected New York Evening World, Mosberg's hometown newspaper, believed Mosberg had won the close bout, taking five of the eight rounds, and had skillfully dropped Brown to the canvas in the fourth. The World further noted that he had weakened Brown throughout the bout with strong body punches and deserved the decision.

In their second and last match together, Mosberg lost to Harry Brown in February 1922 in a close eight-round points decision at Madison Square Garden. Mosberg later claimed he was out of shape for the bout, as he had been called at the last minute to substitute for another boxer. Their semi-final match was fought before a large audience who would later see Benny Leonard fight Rocky Kansas in the final match. The fast and close contest featured a great deal of clinching, that kept the referee busy separating the wary combatants who knew the skills of their opponent from their previous fight. Mosberg's lack of conditioning may have explained his need to clinch so frequently.

Mosberg was in a rough and close twelve-round fight on April 22, 1922, with Mickey Donley at the Clermont Avenue Rink in Brooklyn. Mossberg knocked Donley to the canvas in the opening round, but the majority of the bout was even, though the boxers mixed it up throughout.

=== Eddie Fitzsimmons, June 1922 ===
On June 26, 1922, Mosberg was knocked out a few seconds into the first round by southpaw Eddie Fitzsimmons in an important twelve-round, semi-final match before a huge crowd of 20,000 at New York's Bronx Velodrome. Fitzsimmons was an unusually powerful lightweight, with over 50% of his wins by knockout and a good record against most of the better lightweights of the 1920s. Mosberg, in an interview in 1948, claimed Fitzsimmons had hit him with his powerful left when he went to shake hands shortly after the opening bell. The large crowd had come to see Benny Leonard meet welterweight champion Jack Britton in the final match but first watched the Mosberg bout. The powerful Fitzsimmons had beaten future world Junior Welterweight champion Pinky Mitchell and had fared well against the great lightweights Johnny Dundee, Pal Moran, and New York Jewish battler Lou Tendler. He had also won decisive victories over Chicagoan Jewish lightweight Charley White, New York Jewish lightweight Phil Bloom and 1920 Connecticut state welterweight champion Lou Bogash. Mosberg felt badly about the loss and was hoping for a rematch when he was called to fight in Australia.

=== Loss to Australian light champ, Hughie Dwyer, 1922 ===
Mosberg boxed in Australia in 1922, losing a decision to new Australian national lightweight champion Hughie Dwyer in a long and grueling twenty-round non-title fight in Brisbane on November 25, but defeating 5-foot-3-inch Filipino Silvino Jamito on December 9, who lacked his reach and power, in another twenty-round bout. In the Dwyer bout, Mosberg received a hard bash in the second that rocked him, but dropped Dwyer briefly in the sixteenth, using an effective defense to remain on his feet throughout the historic match. Mosberg later claimed Dwyer was not a hard puncher, and typical of his English style, favored long-range boxing and retreating to the close-range infighting that was characteristic of American boxing in the era.

In a late-career match on May 11, 1923, Mosberg defeated New Jersey boxer Willie Shaw in Hoboken, New Jersey, in a twelve-round newspaper decision. Near the end of his career on August 14, 1923, Mosberg had a close ten-round fight with Jack Rappaport at the open air arena of Broad Athletic Club in Newark, New Jersey. Mosberg suffered from a six-inch disadvantage in height, greatly limiting his reach against Rappaport but won the bout in the decision of the New York Evening Telegraph, who wrote "Sammy had a clear lead over his opponent all the way".

In his last reported bout, on October 8, 1923, Mosberg lost to local boxer Jack McFarland in a close eight-round points decision at Dreamland Park in Newark, New Jersey. McFarland had the stronger punch, and was able to dominate the infighting, a skill the more experienced, but battle-weary Mosberg had excelled in his earlier boxing career. McFarland was a respectable welterweight who would meet exceptional boxer Lew Tendler twice, and Benny Valgar once, but would not fare well against them. Having lost to a rival of lesser talent, Mosberg considered retirement after the bout.

He retired from professional boxing at age 27 after his loss to McFarland. He knew that the recent death of his manager Jack Bulger would impede his chance to find future matches, and he was drawn to the opportunity to go into the furniture business with his father.

== Life after boxing, 1923–1967 ==
He owned and ran two large and successful furniture salesrooms in the Borough Hall neighborhood of Brooklyn for most of his life after boxing and later had success as a real estate broker.

Mosberg, who was Jewish, coached the United States boxing team at the 1953 Maccabiah Games. Mosberg assisted and coached a benefit for the American team headed for the Maccabiah Games in Jamaica, New York, on August 30, 1953, and coached, raised money, and acted as a speaker for amateur boxing on many occasions during his retirement.

He died on August 30, 1967, in Brooklyn, New York, of a heart attack. He was inducted into the International Jewish Sports Hall of Fame in 1985.

== Selected fights ==
7 Wins, 6 Losses
Result	Opponent(s)	Date	Location	Duration	Notes
Win	Richard Beland	Aug 23, 1920	Antwerp, Bel.	1st Round KO	Semi-Final Olympic bout
Win	Gottfred Johansen	Aug 24, 1920	Antwerp, Bel.		Lightwt. Gold Medal
Win	Frank Cassidy	Dec 7, 1920	Jersey City	10 Rounds	Likely Pro debut
Win	Paul Edwards	Dec 25, 1920	New York City	10 Round Unan. Dec.	Decisive win
Win	Frankie Connifrey	Feb 5, 1921	New York City	2nd Round TKO	
Win	Bert Spencer	June 6, 1921	Harrison, PA	8 Round NWS	Audience 30,000
Loss	Mel Coogan	Aug 13, 1921	Long Island City, Queens	12 Rounds	
Loss	Harry Brown	Dec 26, 1921	Philadelphia	8 Rounds, NWS	
Loss	Harry Brown	Feb 10, 1922	New York City	8 Rounds	At Madison Sq. Gard.
Loss	Eddie Fitzsimmons	Jun 26, 1922	Bronx, NY	1st Round KO	
Loss	Hughie Dwyer	Nov 25, 1922	Sydney	20 Rounds	Dwyer, Aus. Light. Champ.
Win	Silvito Jamino	Dec 9, 1922	Brisbane	20 Rounds	

== See also ==
- List of select Jewish boxers
