= Gymnastics at the 1920 Summer Olympics – Men's team, free system =

Gymnastics at the Olympics

Men's free system team gymnastics at the Games of the VII Olympiad
- Venue: Olympisch Stadion
- Date: August 27, 1920
- Competitors: 46 from 2 nations

Medalists
1st place, gold medalist(s)		Denmark
2nd place, silver medalist(s)		Norway

The men's free system team was an artistic gymnastics event held as part of the 1920 Summer Olympics gymnastics programme. It was the second and final appearance of the event, which was one of three team gymnastics events held in 1920 (along with the all-around team event and the Swedish system team event). Two teams competed, for a total of 46 gymnasts. Denmark won the gold medal in this event.

== Results ==
Final
Place	Team	Score
Gold	Denmark	51.35
Silver	Norway	48.55
Bronze	None	—

== Sources ==
- Belgium Olympic Committee (1957). Olympic Games Antwerp 1920: Official Report (in French).
- Wudarski, Pawel (1999). "Wyniki Igrzysk Olimpijskich" (in Polish).
