= Team all-around artistic gymnastics at the Olympics =

Artistic team all-around at the Olympic Games
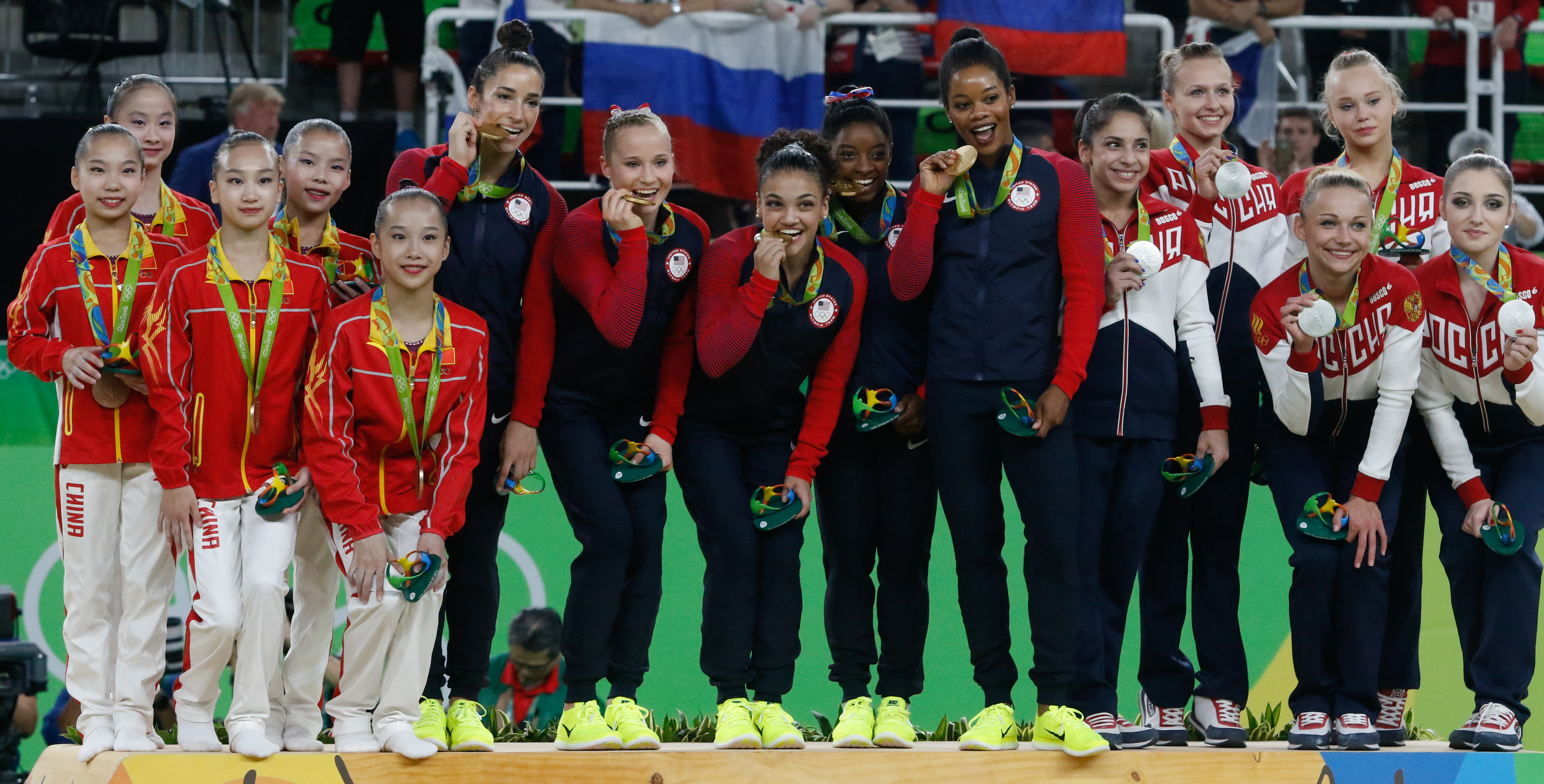
- Women's team final medal podium at the 2016 Olympic Games

Overview
- Sport: Artistic gymnastics
- Gender: Men and women
- Years held: Men: 1908–2024; Women: 1928, 1936–2024

Reigning champion
- Men: Japan; Daiki Hashimoto; Kazuma Kaya; Shinnosuke Oka; Takaaki Sugino; Wataru Tanigawa
- Women: United States; Simone Biles; Jade Carey; Jordan Chiles; Sunisa Lee; Hezly Rivera

The team all-around is an artistic gymnastics event held at the Summer Olympics. The event was first held for men at the third modern Olympics in 1904 but was only contested by teams from the United States. In 1908 and onwards it was contested by multiple different nations. The women's competition was added in 1928, skipped in 1932, and was re-added in 1936. It has been contested at every Olympic Games since.

== Medalists ==
=== Men ===
Games	Gold	Silver	Bronze
1908 London	Sweden; Gösta Åsbrink; Carl Bertilsson; Hjalmar Cedercrona; Andreas Cervin; Rudolf Degermark; Carl Folcker; Sven Forssman; Erik Granfelt; Carl Hårleman; Nils Hellsten; Gunnar Höjer; Arvid Holmberg; Carl Holmberg; Oswald Holmberg; Hugo Jahnke; Johan Jarlén; Gustaf Johnsson; Rolf Johnsson; Nils von Kantzow; Sven Landberg; Olle Lanner; Axel Ljung; Osvald Moberg; Carl Martin Norberg; Erik Norberg; Tor Norberg; Axel Norling; Daniel Norling; Gösta Olson; Leonard Peterson; Sven Rosén; Gustaf Rosenquist; Axel Sjöblom; Birger Sörvik; Haakon Sörvik; Karl Johan Svensson; Karl-Gustaf Vingqvist; Nils Widforss	Norway; Arthur Amundsen; Carl Albert Andersen; Otto Authén; Hermann Bohne; Trygve Bøyesen; Oskar Bye; Conrad Carlsrud; Sverre Grøner; Harald Halvorsen; Harald Hansen; Petter Hol; Eugen Ingebretsen; Ole Iversen; Per Mathias Jespersen; Sigge Johannessen; Nicolai Kiær; Carl Klæth; Thor Larsen; Rolf Lefdahl; Hans Lem; Anders Moen; Frithjof Olsen; Carl Alfred Pedersen; Paul Pedersen; Sigvard Sivertsen; John Skrataas; Harald Smedvik; Andreas Strand; Olaf Syvertsen; Thomas Thorstensen	Finland; Eino Forsström; Otto Granström; Johan Kemp; Iivari Kyykoski; Heikki Lehmusto; John Lindroth; Yrjö Linko; Edvard Linna; Matti Markkanen; Kalle Mikkolainen; Veli Nieminen; Kalle Kustaa Paasia; Arvi Pohjanpää; Aarne Pohjonen; Eino Railio; Ale Riipinen; Arno Saarinen; Einar Sahlstein; Aarne Salovaara; Torsten Sandelin; Elis Sipilä; Viktor Smeds; Kaarlo Soinio; Kurt Stenberg; Väinö Tiiri; Magnus Wegelius
1912 Stockholm	Italy; Pietro Bianchi; Guido Boni; Alberto Braglia; Giuseppe Domenichelli; Carlo Fregosi; Alfredo Gollini; Francesco Loi; Luigi Maiocco; Giovanni Mangiante; Lorenzo Mangiante; Serafino Mazzarochi; Guido Romano; Paolo Salvi; Luciano Savorini; Adolfo Tunesi; Giorgio Zampori; Umberto Zanolini; Angelo Zorzi	Hungary; József Bittenbinder; Imre Erdődy; Samu Fóti; Imre Gellért; Győző Haberfeld; Ottó Hellmich; István Herczeg; József Keresztessy; Lajos Kmetykó; János Krizmanich; Elemér Pászti; Árpád Pédery; Jenõ Rittich; Ferenc Szüts; Ödön Téry; Géza Tuli	Great Britain; Albert Betts; William Cowhig; Sidney Cross; Harold Dickason; Herbert Drury; Bernard Franklin; Leonard Hanson; Samuel Hodgetts; Charles Luck; William MacKune; Ronald McLean; Alfred Messenger; Henry Oberholzer; Edward Pepper; Edward Potts; Reginald Potts; George Ross; Charles Simmons; Arthur Southern; William Titt; Charles Vigurs; Samuel Walker; John Whitaker
1920 Antwerp	Italy; Arnaldo Andreoli; Ettore Bellotto; Pietro Bianchi; Fernando Bonatti; Luigi Cambiaso; Luigi Contessi; Carlo Costigliolo; Luigi Costigliolo; Giuseppe Domenichelli; Roberto Ferrari; Carlo Fregosi; Romualdo Ghiglione; Ambrogio Levati; Francesco Loi; Vittorio Lucchetti; Luigi Maiocco; Ferdinando Mandrini; Lorenzo Mangiante; Antonio Marovelli; Michele Mastromarino; Giuseppe Paris; Manlio Pastorini; Ezio Roselli; Paolo Salvi; Giovanni Tubino; Giorgio Zampori; Angelo Zorzi	Belgium; Eugenius Auwerkerken; Théophile Bauer; François Claessens; Augustus Cootmans; Frans Gibens; Albert Haepers; Domien Jacob; Félicien Kempeneers; Jules Labéeu; Hubert Lafortune; Auguste Landrieu; Charles Lannie; Constant Loriot; Nicolaas Moerloos; Ferdinand Minnaert; Louis Stoop; Jean Van Guysse; Alphonse Van Mele; François Verboven; Jean Verboven; Julien Verdonck; Joseph Verstraeten; Georges Vivex; Julianus Wagemans	France; Georges Berger; Émile Bouchès; René Boulanger; Alfred Buyenne; Eugène Cordonnier; Léon Delsarte; Lucien Démanet; Paul Durin; Victor Duvant; Fernand Fauconnier; Arthur Hermann; Albert Hersoy; Alphonse Higelin; Auguste Hoël; Louis Quempe; Georges Lagouge; Paulin Lemaire; Ernest Lespinasse; Émile Boitelle; Jules Pirard; Eugène Pollet; Georges Thurnherr; Marco Torrès; François Walker; Julien Wartelle; Paul Wartelle
1924 Paris	Italy; Luigi Cambiaso; Mario Lertora; Vittorio Lucchetti; Luigi Maiocco; Ferdinando Mandrini; Francesco Martino; Giuseppe Paris; Giorgio Zampori	France; Eugène Cordonnier; Léon Delsarte; François Gangloff; Jean Gounot; Arthur Hermann; Alphonse Higelin; Joseph Huber; Albert Séguin	Switzerland; Hans Grieder; August Güttinger; Jean Gutweninger; Georges Miez; Otto Pfister; Antoine Rebetez; Carl Widmer; Josef Wilhelm
1928 Amsterdam	Switzerland; Hans Grieder; August Güttinger; Hermann Hänggi; Eugen Mack; Georges Miez; Otto Pfister; Eduard Steinemann; Melchior Wezel	Czechoslovakia; Josef Effenberger; Jan Gajdoš; Jan Koutný; Emanuel Löffler; Bedřich Šupčík; Ladislav Tikal; Ladislav Vácha; Václav Veselý	Yugoslavia; Edvard Antonijevič; Dragutin Cioti; Stane Derganc; Boris Gregorka; Anton Malej; Ivan Porenta; Josip Primožič; Leon Štukelj
1932 Los Angeles	Italy; Oreste Capuzzo; Savino Guglielmetti; Mario Lertora; Romeo Neri; Franco Tognini	United States; Frank Haubold; Frank Cumiskey; Al Jochim; Fred Meyer; Michael Schuler	Finland; Mauri Nyberg-Noroma; Ilmari Pakarinen; Heikki Savolainen; Einari Teräsvirta; Martti Uosikkinen
1936 Berlin	Germany; Franz Beckert; Konrad Frey; Alfred Schwarzmann; Willi Stadel; Innozenz Stangl; Walter Steffens; Matthias Volz; Ernst Winter	Switzerland; Walter Bach; Albert Bachmann; Walter Beck; Eugen Mack; Georges Miez; Michael Reusch; Eduard Steinemann; Josef Walter	Finland; Mauri Nyberg-Noroma; Veikko Pakarinen; Aleksanteri Saarvala; Heikki Savolainen; Esa Seeste; Einari Teräsvirta; Eino Tukiainen; Martti Uosikkinen
1948 London	Finland; Paavo Aaltonen; Veikko Huhtanen; Kalevi Laitinen; Olavi Rove; Aleksanteri Saarvala; Sulo Salmi; Heikki Savolainen; Einari Teräsvirta	Switzerland; Karl Frei; Christian Kipfer; Walter Lehmann; Robert Lucy; Michael Reusch; Josef Stalder; Emil Studer; Melchior Thalmann	Hungary; László Baranyai; Jozsef Fekete; Gyözö Mogyorosi; János Mogyorósi-Klencs; Ferenc Pataki; Lajos Sántha; Lajos Tóth; Ferenc Várkõi
1952 Helsinki	Soviet Union; Vladimir Belyakov; Iosif Berdiev; Viktor Chukarin; Yevgeny Korolkov; Dmytro Leonkin; Valentin Muratov; Mikhail Perlman; Hrant Shahinyan	Switzerland; Hans Eugster; Ernst Fivian; Ernst Gebendinger; Jack Günthard; Hans Schwarzentruber; Josef Stalder; Melchior Thalmann; Jean Tschabold	Finland; Paavo Aaltonen; Kalevi Laitinen; Onni Lappalainen; Kaino Lempinen; Berndt Lindfors; Olavi Rove; Heikki Savolainen; Kalevi Viskari
1956 Melbourne	Soviet Union; Albert Azaryan; Viktor Chukarin; Valentin Muratov; Boris Shakhlin; Pavel Stolbov; Yuri Titov	Japan; Nobuyuki Aihara; Akira Kono; Masami Kubota; Takashi Ono; Masao Takemoto; Shinsaku Tsukawaki	Finland; Raimo Heinonen; Olavi Laimuvirta; Onni Lappalainen; Berndt Lindfors; Martti Mansikka; Kalevi Suoniemi
1960 Rome	Japan; Nobuyuki Aihara; Yukio Endō; Takashi Mitsukuri; Takashi Ono; Masao Takemoto; Shuji Tsurumi	Soviet Union; Albert Azaryan; Valery Kerdemilidi; Nikolai Miligulo; Vladimir Portnoi; Boris Shakhlin; Yuri Titov	Italy; Giovanni Carminucci; Pasquale Carminucci; Gianfranco Marzolla; Franco Menichelli; Orlando Polmonari; Angelo Vicardi
1964 Tokyo	Japan; Yukio Endō; Takuji Hayata; Takashi Mitsukuri; Takashi Ono; Shuji Tsurumi; Haruhiro Yamashita	Soviet Union; Sergey Diomidov; Viktor Leontyev; Viktor Lisitsky; Boris Shakhlin; Yuri Titov; Yury Tsapenko	United Team of Germany; Siegfried Fülle; Philipp Fürst; Erwin Koppe; Klaus Köste; Günter Lyhs; Peter Weber
1968 Mexico City	Japan; Yukio Endō; Sawao Katō; Takeshi Katō; Eizo Kenmotsu; Akinori Nakayama; Mitsuo Tsukahara	Soviet Union; Sergey Diomidov; Valery Iljinykh; Valery Karasev; Viktor Klimenko; Victor Lisitsky; Mikhail Voronin	East Germany; Günter Beier; Matthias Brehme; Gerhard Dietrich; Siegfried Fülle; Klaus Köste; Peter Weber
1972 Munich	Japan; Shigeru Kasamatsu; Sawao Katō; Eizo Kenmotsu; Akinori Nakayama; Teruichi Okamura; Mitsuo Tsukahara	Soviet Union; Nikolai Andrianov; Viktor Klimenko; Alexander Maleev; Edvard Mikaelian; Vladimir Schukin; Mikhail Voronin	East Germany; Matthias Brehme; Wolfgang Klotz; Klaus Köste; Jürgen Paeke; Reinhard Rychly; Wolfgang Thüne
1976 Montreal	Japan; Shun Fujimoto; Hisato Igarashi; Hiroshi Kajiyama; Sawao Katō; Eizo Kenmotsu; Mitsuo Tsukahara	Soviet Union; Nikolai Andrianov; Alexander Dityatin; Gennady Krysin; Vladimir Marchenko; Vladimir Markelov; Vladimir Tikhonov	East Germany; Roland Brückner; Rainer Hanschke; Bernd Jäger; Wolfgang Klotz; Lutz Mack; Michael Nikolay
1980 Moscow	Soviet Union; Nikolai Andrianov; Eduard Azaryan; Alexander Dityatin; Bohdan Makuts; Vladimir Markelov; Aleksandr Tkachyov	East Germany; Ralf-Peter Hemmann; Lutz Hoffmann; Lutz Mack; Michael Nikolay; Andreas Bronst; Roland Brückner	Hungary; Ferenc Donath; György Guczoghy; Zoltan Kelemen; Peter Kovacs; Zoltán Magyar; Istvan Vamos
1984 Los Angeles	United States; Bart Conner; Tim Daggett; Mitch Gaylord; Jim Hartung; Scott Johnson; Peter Vidmar	China; Li Ning; Li Xiaoping; Li Yuejiu; Lou Yun; Tong Fei; Xu Zhiqiang	Japan; Kōji Gushiken; Noritoshi Hirata; Nobuyuki Kajitani; Shinji Morisue; Koji Sotomura; Kyoji Yamawaki
1988 Seoul	Soviet Union; Vladimir Artemov; Dmitry Bilozerchev; Vladimir Gogoladze; Sergey Kharkov; Valeri Liukin; Vladimir Nouvikov	East Germany; Holger Behrendt; Ralf Büchner; Ulf Hoffmann; Sylvio Kroll; Sven Tippelt; Andreas Wecker	Japan; Yukio Iketani; Hiroyuki Konishi; Koichi Mizushima; Daisuke Nishikawa; Toshiharu Sato; Takahiro Yameda
1992 Barcelona	Unified Team; Valery Belenky; Ihor Korobchynskyi; Hrihoriy Misyutin; Vitaly Scherbo; Rustam Sharipov; Aleksey Voropayev	China; Guo Linyao; Li Chunyang; Li Dashuang; Li Ge; Li Jing; Li Xiaoshuang	Japan; Yutaka Aihara; Takashi Chinen; Yoshiaki Hatakeda; Yukio Iketani; Masayuki Matsunaga; Daisuke Nishikawa
1996 Atlanta	Russia; Sergey Kharkov; Nikolai Kryukov; Alexei Nemov; Yevgeni Podgorny; Dmitri Trush; Dmitri Vasilenko; Aleksey Voropayev	China; Fan Bin; Fan Hongbin; Huang Huadong; Huang Liping; Li Xiaoshuang; Shen Jian; Zhang Jinjing	Ukraine; Ihor Korobchynskyi; Oleg Kosiak; Hrihoriy Misyutin; Vladimir Shamenko; Rustam Sharipov; Olexander Svitlichni; Yuri Yermakov
2000 Sydney	China; Huang Xu; Li Xiaopeng; Xiao Junfeng; Xing Aowei; Yang Wei; Zheng Lihui	Ukraine; Alexander Beresch; Valeriy Honcharov; Ruslan Mezentsev; Valeri Pereshkura; Olexander Svitlichni; Roman Zozulya	Russia; Maxim Aleshin; Alexei Bondarenko; Dmitri Drevin; Nikolai Kryukov; Alexei Nemov; Yevgeni Podgorny
2004 Athens	Japan; Takehiro Kashima; Hisashi Mizutori; Daisuke Nakano; Hiroyuki Tomita; Naoya Tsukahara; Isao Yoneda	United States; Jason Gatson; Morgan Hamm; Paul Hamm; Brett McClure; Blaine Wilson; Guard Young	Romania; Marian Drăgulescu; Ilie Daniel Popescu; Dan Nicolae Potra; Răzvan Dorin Şelariu; Ioan Silviu Suciu; Marius Urzică
2008 Beijing	China; Chen Yibing; Huang Xu; Li Xiaopeng; Xiao Qin; Yang Wei; Zou Kai	Japan; Takehiro Kashima; Takuya Nakase; Makoto Okiguchi; Koki Sakamoto; Hiroyuki Tomita; Kōhei Uchimura	United States; Alexander Artemev; Raj Bhavsar; Joe Hagerty; Jonathan Horton; Justin Spring; Kai Wen Tan
2012 London	China; Chen Yibing; Feng Zhe; Guo Weiyang; Zhang Chenglong; Zou Kai	Japan; Ryohei Kato; Kazuhito Tanaka; Yusuke Tanaka; Kōhei Uchimura; Koji Yamamuro	Great Britain; Sam Oldham; Daniel Purvis; Louis Smith; Kristian Thomas; Max Whitlock
2016 Rio de Janeiro	Japan (JPN); Kenzō Shirai; Yūsuke Tanaka; Koji Yamamuro; Kōhei Uchimura; Ryōhei Katō	Russia (RUS); Denis Ablyazin; David Belyavskiy; Ivan Stretovich; Nikolai Kuksenkov; Nikita Nagornyy	China (CHN); Deng Shudi; Lin Chaopan; Liu Yang; You Hao; Zhang Chenglong
2020 Tokyo	ROC (ROC); Denis Ablyazin; David Belyavskiy; Artur Dalaloyan; Nikita Nagornyy	Japan (JPN); Daiki Hashimoto; Kazuma Kaya; Takeru Kitazono; Wataru Tanigawa	China (CHN); Lin Chaopan; Sun Wei; Xiao Ruoteng; Zou Jingyuan
2024 Paris	Japan (JPN); Daiki Hashimoto; Kazuma Kaya; Shinnosuke Oka; Takaaki Sugino; Wataru Tanigawa	China (CHN); Liu Yang; Su Weide; Xiao Ruoteng; Zhang Boheng; Zou Jingyuan	United States (USA); Asher Hong; Paul Juda; Brody Malone; Stephen Nedoroscik; Fred Richard

==== Team medal counts ====
Rank	Nation	Gold	Silver	Bronze	Total
1	Japan	8	4	3	15
2	Soviet Union	4	5	0	9
3	Italy	4	0	1	5
4	China	3	4	2	9
5	Switzerland	1	3	1	5
6	United States	1	2	2	5
7	Russia	1	1	1	3
8	Finland	1	0	5	6
9	Germany	1	0	0	1
9	ROC	1	0	0	1
9	Sweden	1	0	0	1
9	Unified Team	1	0	0	1
13	East Germany	0	3	3	6
14	Hungary	0	1	2	3
15	France	0	1	1	2
15	Ukraine	0	1	1	2
16	Belgium	0	1	0	1
16	Czechoslovakia	0	1	0	1
16	Norway	0	1	0	1
19	Great Britain	0	0	2	2
20	Romania	0	0	1	1
20	United Team of Germany	0	0	1	1
20	Yugoslavia	0	0	1	1

=== Women ===
Games	Gold	Silver	Bronze
1928 Amsterdam	Netherlands; Estella Agsteribbe; Jacomina van den Berg; Alida van den Bos; Petronella Burgerhof; Elka de Levie; Helena Nordheim; Ans Polak; Petronella van Randwijk; Hendrika van Rumt; Jud Simons; Jacoba Stelma; Anna van der Vegt	Italy; Bianca Ambrosetti; Lavinia Gianoni; Luigina Giavotti; Virginia Giorgi; Germana Malabarba; Carla Marangoni; Luigina Perversi; Diana Pissavini; Luisa Tanzini; Carolina Tronconi; Ines Vercesi; Rita Vittadini	Great Britain; Annie Broadbent; Lucy Desmond; Margaret Hartley; Amy Jagger; Isobel Judd; Jessie Kite; Marjorie Moreman; Edith Pickles; Ethel Seymour; Ada Smith; Hilda Smith; Doris Woods
1936 Berlin	Germany; Anita Bärwirth; Erna Bürger; Isolde Frölian; Friedl Iby; Trudi Meyer; Paula Pöhlsen; Julie Schmitt; Käthe Sohnemann	Czechoslovakia; Jaroslava Bajerová; Vlasta Děkanová; Božena Dobešová; Vlasta Foltová; Anna Hřebřinová; Matylda Pálfyová; Zdeňka Veřmiřovská; Marie Větrovská	Hungary; Margit Csillik; Margit Kalocsai; Ilona Madary; Gabriella Mészáros; Margit Nagy; Olga Törös; Judit Tóth; Eszter Voit
1948 London	Czechoslovakia; Zdeňka Honsová; Marie Kovářová; Miloslava Misáková; Milena Müllerová; Věra Růžičková; Olga Šilhánová; Božena Srncová; Zdeňka Veřmiřovská	Hungary; Erzsébet Balázs; Irén Karcsics; Anna Fehér; Erzsébet Gulyás-Köteles; Olga Tass; Margit Nagy-Sándor; Edit Perényi-Weckinger; Mária Zalai-Kövi	United States; Ladislava Bakanic; Marian Barone; Dorothy Dalton; Meta Elste; Consetta Lenz; Helen Schifano; Clara Schroth; Anita Simonis
1952 Helsinki	Soviet Union; Nina Bocharova; Pelageya Danilova; Maria Gorokhovskaya; Medea Jugeli; Ekaterina Kalinchuk; Galina Minaicheva; Galina Shamrai; Galina Urbanovich	Hungary; Andrea Bodó; Irén Daruházi-Karcsics; Erzsébet Gulyás-Köteles; Ágnes Keleti; Margit Korondi; Edit Perényi-Weckinger; Olga Tass; Mária Kövi-Zalai	Czechoslovakia; Hana Bobková; Alena Chadimová; Jana Rabasová; Alena Reichová; Matylda Šínová; Božena Srncová; Věra Vančurová; Eva Věchtová
1956 Melbourne	Soviet Union; Polina Astakhova; Lyudmila Yegorova; Lidia Kalinina; Larisa Latynina; Tamara Manina; Sofia Muratova	Hungary; Erzsébet Gulyás-Köteles; Ágnes Keleti; Alice Kertész; Margit Korondi; Olga Lemhényi-Tass; Andrea Molnár-Bodó	Romania; Georgeta Hurmuzachi; Sonia Iovan; Elena Leuşteanu; Elena Mărgărit; Elena Săcălici; Emilia Vătășoiu
1960 Rome	Soviet Union; Polina Astakhova; Lidia Ivanova; Larisa Latynina; Tamara Lyukhina; Sofia Muratova; Margarita Nikolaeva	Czechoslovakia; Eva Bosáková; Věra Čáslavská; Matylda Matoušková; Hana Růžičková; Ludmila Švédová; Adolfína Tačová	Romania; Atanasia Ionescu; Sonia Iovan; Elena Leuşteanu; Elena Niculescu; Uta Poreceanu; Emilia Vătășoiu
1964 Tokyo	Soviet Union; Polina Astakhova; Lyudmila Gromova; Larisa Latynina; Tamara Manina; Elena Volchetskaya; Tamara Zamotailova	Czechoslovakia; Věra Čáslavská; Marianna Krajčírová; Jana Kubičková; Hana Růžičková; Jaroslava Sedláčková; Adolfína Tkačíková	Japan; Toshiko Aihara; Ginko Chiba; Keiko Ikeda; Taniko Nakamura; Kiyoko Ono; Hiroko Tsuji
1968 Mexico City	Soviet Union; Lyubov Burda; Olga Karaseva; Natalia Kuchinskaya; Larisa Petrik; Ludmilla Tourischeva; Zinaida Voronina	Czechoslovakia; Věra Čáslavská; Marianna Krajčírová; Jana Kubičková; Hana Lišková; Bohumila Řimnáčová; Miroslava Skleničková	East Germany; Maritta Bauerschmidt; Karin Janz; Marianne Noack; Magdalena Schmidt; Ute Starke; Erika Zuchold
1972 Munich	Soviet Union; Lyubov Burda; Olga Korbut; Antonina Koshel; Tamara Lazakovich; Elvira Saadi; Ludmilla Tourischeva	East Germany; Irene Abel; Angelika Hellmann; Karin Janz; Richarda Schmeisser; Christine Schmitt; Erika Zuchold	Hungary; Ilona Bekesi; Monika Csaszar; Marta Kelemen; Aniko Kery; Krisztina Medveczky; Zsuzsa Nagy
1976 Montreal	Soviet Union; Maria Filatova; Svetlana Grozdova; Nellie Kim; Olga Korbut; Elvira Saadi; Ludmilla Tourischeva	Romania; Nadia Comăneci; Mariana Constantin; Georgeta Gabor; Anca Grigoraș; Gabriela Trușcă; Teodora Ungureanu	East Germany; Carola Dombeck; Gitta Escher; Kerstin Gerschau; Angelika Hellmann; Marion Kische; Steffi Kräker
1980 Moscow	Soviet Union; Yelena Davydova; Maria Filatova; Nellie Kim; Yelena Naimushina; Natalia Shaposhnikova; Stella Zakharova	Romania; Nadia Comăneci; Rodica Dunca; Emilia Eberle; Cristina Elena Grigoraș; Melita Ruhn; Dumitriţa Turner	East Germany; Maxi Gnauck; Silvia Hindorff; Steffi Kräker; Katharina Rensch; Karola Sube; Birgit Suss
1984 Los Angeles	Romania; Lavinia Agache; Laura Cutina; Cristina Elena Grigoraș; Simona Păucă; Mihaela Stănuleț; Ecaterina Szabo	United States; Pamela Bileck; Michelle Dusserre; Kathy Johnson; Julianne McNamara; Mary Lou Retton; Tracee Talavera	China; Chen Yongyan; Huang Qun; Ma Yanhong; Wu Jiani; Zhou Ping; Zhou Qiurui
1988 Seoul	Soviet Union; Svetlana Baitova; Svetlana Boginskaya; Natalia Laschenova; Elena Shevchenko; Yelena Shushunova; Olga Strazheva	Romania; Aurelia Dobre; Eugenia Golea; Celestina Popa; Gabriela Potorac; Daniela Silivaș; Camelia Voinea	East Germany; Gabriele Fähnrich; Martina Jentsch; Dagmar Kersten; Ulrike Klotz; Bettina Schieferdecker; Dörte Thümmler
1992 Barcelona	Unified Team; Svetlana Boginskaya; Oksana Chusovitina; Rozalia Galiyeva; Elena Grudneva; Tatiana Gutsu; Tatiana Lysenko	Romania; Cristina Bontaș; Gina Gogean; Vanda Hădărean; Lavinia Miloșovici; Maria Neculiță; Mirela Pașca	United States; Wendy Bruce; Dominique Dawes; Shannon Miller; Betty Okino; Kerri Strug; Kim Zmeskal
1996 Atlanta	United States; Amanda Borden; Amy Chow; Dominique Dawes; Shannon Miller; Dominique Moceanu; Jaycie Phelps; Kerri Strug	Russia; Elena Dolgopolova; Rozalia Galiyeva; Elena Grosheva; Svetlana Khorkina; Dina Kochetkova; Yevgeniya Kuznetsova; Oksana Lyapina	Romania; Simona Amânar; Gina Gogean; Ionela Loaieș; Alexandra Marinescu; Lavinia Miloșovici; Mirela Țugurlan
2000 Sydney	Romania; Simona Amânar; Loredana Boboc; Andreea Isărescu; Maria Olaru; Claudia Presăcan; Andreea Răducan	Russia; Anna Chepeleva; Anastasiya Kolesnikova; Svetlana Khorkina; Yekaterina Lobaznyuk; Yelena Produnova; Elena Zamolodchikova	United States; Amy Chow; Jamie Dantzscher; Dominique Dawes; Kristen Maloney; Elise Ray; Tasha Schwikert
2004 Athens	Romania; Oana Ban; Alexandra Eremia; Cătălina Ponor; Monica Roșu; Nicoleta Daniela Șofronie; Silvia Stroescu	United States; Mohini Bhardwaj; Annia Hatch; Terin Humphrey; Courtney Kupets; Courtney McCool; Carly Patterson	Russia; Ludmila Ezhova; Svetlana Khorkina; Maria Krioutchkova; Anna Pavlova; Elena Zamolodchikova; Natalia Ziganshina
2008 Beijing	China; Cheng Fei; Deng Linlin; He Kexin; Jiang Yuyuan; Li Shanshan; Yang Yilin	United States; Shawn Johnson; Nastia Liukin; Chellsie Memmel; Samantha Peszek; Alicia Sacramone; Bridget Sloan	Romania; Andreea Acatrinei; Gabriela Drăgoi; Andreea Grigore; Sandra Izbașa; Steliana Nistor; Anamaria Tămârjan
2012 London	United States; Gabby Douglas; McKayla Maroney; Aly Raisman; Kyla Ross; Jordyn Wieber	Russia; Ksenia Afanasyeva; Anastasia Grishina; Viktoria Komova; Aliya Mustafina; Maria Paseka	Romania; Diana Bulimar; Diana Chelaru; Larisa Iordache; Sandra Izbașa; Cătălina Ponor
2016 Rio de Janeiro	United States; Simone Biles; Gabby Douglas; Laurie Hernandez; Madison Kocian; Aly Raisman	Russia; Angelina Melnikova; Aliya Mustafina; Maria Paseka; Daria Spiridonova; Seda Tutkhalyan	China; Fan Yilin; Mao Yi; Shang Chunsong; Tan Jiaxin; Wang Yan
2020 Tokyo	ROC; Lilia Akhaimova; Viktoria Listunova; Angelina Melnikova; Vladislava Urazova	United States; Simone Biles; Jordan Chiles; Sunisa Lee; Grace McCallum	Great Britain; Jennifer Gadirova; Jessica Gadirova; Alice Kinsella; Amelie Morgan
2024 Paris	United States; Simone Biles; Jade Carey; Jordan Chiles; Sunisa Lee; Hezly Rivera	Italy; Angela Andreoli; Alice D'Amato; Manila Esposito; Elisa Iorio; Giorgia Villa	Brazil; Rebeca Andrade; Jade Barbosa; Lorrane Oliveira; Flávia Saraiva; Júlia Soares

==== Team medal counts ====
Rank	Nation	Gold	Silver	Bronze	Total
1	Soviet Union	9	0	0	9
2	United States	4	4	3	11
3	Romania	3	4	5	12
4	Czechoslovakia	1	4	1	6
5	China	1	0	2	3
6	Germany	1	0	0	1
6	Netherlands	1	0	0	1
6	ROC	1	0	0	1
6	Unified Team	1	0	0	1
10	Russia	0	4	1	5
11	Hungary	0	3	2	5
12	Italy	0	2	0	2
13	East Germany	0	1	4	5
14	Great Britain	0	0	2	2
15	Japan	0	0	1	1
15	Brazil	0	0	1	1

==== Individuals with multiple team medals ====
Rank	Gymnast	Nation	Olympics	Gold	Silver	Bronze	Total
1	Polina Astakhova	Soviet Union	1956–1964	3	0	0	3
1	Larisa Latynina	Soviet Union	1956–1964	3	0	0	3
1	Ludmilla Tourischeva	Soviet Union	1968–1976	3	0	0	3
4	Simone Biles	United States	2016–2024	2	1	0	3
5	Svetlana Boginskaya	Soviet Union; Unified Team	1988–1992	2	0	0	2
5	Lyubov Burda	Soviet Union	1968–1972	2	0	0	2
5	Gabby Douglas	United States	2012–2016	2	0	0	2
5	Maria Filatova	Soviet Union	1976–1980	2	0	0	2
5	Lidiya Ivanova	Soviet Union	1956-1960	2	0	0	2
5	Nellie Kim	Soviet Union	1976–1980	2	0	0	2
5	Olga Korbut	Soviet Union	1972–1976	2	0	0	2
5	Tamara Manina	Soviet Union	1956, 1964	2	0	0	2
5	Sofia Muratova	Soviet Union	1956–1960	2	0	0	2
5	Aly Raisman	United States	2012–2016	2	0	0	2
5	Elvira Saadi	Soviet Union	1972–1976	2	0	0	2
5	Tamara Zamotaylova	Soviet Union	1960–1964	2	0	0	2
17	Jordan Chiles	United States	2020–2024	1	1	0	2
17	Rozalia Galiyeva	Unified Team; Russia	1992–1996	1	1	0	2
17	Cristina Elena Grigoraș	Romania	1980–1984	1	1	0	2
17	Sunisa Lee	United States	2020–2024	1	1	0	2
17	Angelina Melnikova	Russia; ROC	2016–2020	1	1	0	2
17	Zdeňka Veřmiřovská	Czechoslovakia	1936–1948	1	1	0	2
23	Dominique Dawes	United States	1992–2000	1	0	2	3
24	Simona Amânar	Romania	1996–2000	1	0	1	2
24	Amy Chow	United States	1996–2000	1	0	1	2
24	Shannon Miller	United States	1992–1996	1	0	1	2
24	Cătălina Ponor	Romania	2004, 2012	1	0	1	2
24	Božena Srncová	Czechoslovakia	1948–1952	1	0	1	2
24	Kerri Strug	United States	1992–1996	1	0	1	2
30	Věra Čáslavská	Czechoslovakia	1960–1968	0	3	0	3
30	Erzsébet Gulyás-Köteles	Hungary	1948–1956	0	3	0	3
30	Olga Tass	Hungary	1948–1956	0	3	0	3
33	Svetlana Khorkina	Russia	1996–2004	0	2	1	3
34	Nadia Comăneci	Romania	1976–1980	0	2	0	2
34	Ágnes Keleti	Hungary	1952–1956	0	2	0	2
34	Margit Korondi	Hungary	1952–1956	0	2	0	2
34	Jana Kubičková-Posnerová	Czechoslovakia	1964–1968	0	2	0	2
34	Andrea Molnár-Bodó	Hungary	1952–1956	0	2	0	2
34	Aliya Mustafina	Russia	2012–2016	0	2	0	2
34	Marianna Némethová-Krajčírová	Czechoslovakia	1964–1968	0	2	0	2
34	Maria Paseka	Russia	2012–2016	0	2	0	2
34	Edit Perényi-Weckinger	Hungary	1948–1952	0	2	0	2
34	Hana Růžičková	Czechoslovakia	1960–1964	0	2	0	2
34	Adolfína Tkačíková-Tačová	Czechoslovakia	1960–1964	0	2	0	2
34	Mária Zalai-Kövi	Hungary	1948–1952	0	2	0	2
46	Eva Bosáková	Czechoslovakia	1952, 1960	0	1	1	2
46	Gina Gogean	Romania	1992–1996	0	1	1	2
46	Angelika Hellmann	East Germany	1972–1976	0	1	1	2
46	Karin Janz	East Germany	1968–1972	0	1	1	2
46	Matylda Matoušková-Šínová	Czechoslovakia	1952, 1960	0	1	1	2
46	Lavinia Miloșovici	Romania	1992–1996	0	1	1	2
46	Margit Nagy-Sándor	Hungary	1936–1948	0	1	1	2
46	Elena Zamolodchikova	Russia	2000–2004	0	1	1	2
46	Erika Zuchold	East Germany	1968–1972	0	1	1	2
55	Sandra Izbașa	Romania	2008–2012	0	0	2	2
55	Steffi Kräker	East Germany	1976–1980	0	0	2	2
