= Great Britain at the 1920 Summer Olympics =

- Flag of Great Britain
- IOC code: GBR
- NOC: British Olympic Association

in Antwerp
- Competitors: 234 (218 men and 16 women) in 21 sports
- Flag bearer: Philip Noel-Baker
- Medals Ranked 3rd: Gold 14 Silver 15 Bronze 13 Total 42

Summer Olympics appearances (overview)
- 1896; 1900; 1904; 1908; 1912; 1920; 1924; 1928; 1932; 1936; 1948; 1952; 1956; 1960; 1964; 1968; 1972; 1976; 1980; 1984; 1988; 1992; 1996; 2000; 2004; 2008; 2012; 2016; 2020; 2024

Other related appearances
- 1906 Intercalated Games

Great Britain, represented by the British Olympic Association (BOA), competed at the 1920 Summer Olympics in Antwerp, Belgium. 234 competitors, 218 men and 16 women, took part in 84 events in 21 sports. British athletes won fourteen gold medals (up from ten in 1912) and 43 medals overall, finishing third. It would be the last Olympic Games in which Irish athletes participated for Great Britain, after foundation of Irish Free State in 1922.

== Aquatics ==
=== Diving ===
Five divers consisting of three men and two women, represented Great Britain in 1920. It was the nation's third appearance in the sport. Just as in 1912, the women had the better showing for the country. Armstrong posted the country's best result to that point, taking the silver medal in the platform. White, who had won Great Britain's only previous medal in the sport, was unable to match her bronze from 1912 and took fourth place in the platform.

Men

Ranks given are within the semifinal group.

Diver	Event	Semifinals			Final		
Diver	Event	Points	Score	Rank	Points	Score	Rank
Harold Clarke	Plain high dive	10	164.5	2 Q	40	142.0	9
Albert Dickin	Plain high dive	17	140.5	4	Did not advance		
Ernest Walmsley	3 m springboard	28	453.05	5	Did not advance		

Women

Ranks given are within the semifinal group.

Diver	Event	Semifinals			Final		
Diver	Event	Points	Score	Rank	Points	Score	Rank
Beatrice Armstrong	10 m platform	7	158.0	1 Q	10	166.0	2nd place, silver medalist(s)
Isabelle White	10 m platform	20	148.5	3 Q	18	158.5	4

=== Swimming ===
Eighteen swimmers, twelve men and six women, represented Great Britain in 1920. It was the nation's fourth appearance in the sport. Great Britain won two medals, one in each of the relays. The men took bronze, while the women took silver. Jeans was the only individual finalist for the country, advancing to the finals in both of the women's events and taking fourth place each time.

Ranks given are within the heat.

Men

Swimmer	Event	Quarterfinals		Semifinals		Final	
Swimmer	Event	Result	Rank	Result	Rank	Result	Rank
Harold Annison	100 m free	Unknown	4	Did not advance			
Harold Annison	400 m free	5:58.0	1 Q	Unknown	4	Did not advance	
Harold Annison	1500 m free	24:28.2	1 Q	23:51.4	3	Did not advance	
Albert Dickin	100 m free	Unknown	5	Did not advance			
John Dickin	100 m free	1:10.0	3	Did not advance			
Jack Hatfield	400 m free	5:50.6	3	Did not advance			
Jack Hatfield	1500 m free	23:56.6	3	Did not advance			
Rex Lassam	200 m breast	Unknown	4	Did not advance			
Rex Lassam	400 m breast	Unknown	4	Did not advance			
Ernest Parker	200 m breast	Unknown	6	Did not advance			
Edward Peter	400 m free	Unknown	5	Did not advance			
Edward Peter	1500 m free	24:39.4	2 Q	Unknown	5	Did not advance	
George Robertson	100 m back	N/A		Unknown	6	Did not advance	
George Robertson	200 m breast	Unknown	6	Did not advance			
George Robertson	400 m breast	7:28.0	3	Did not advance			
Leslie Savage	100 m free	Unknown	5	Did not advance			
William Stoney	200 m breast	3:20.8	3	Did not advance			
Henry Taylor	400 m free	6:01.2	2 Q	Unknown	4	Did not advance	
Henry Taylor	1500 m free	Did not finish		Did not advance			
George Webster	100 m back	N/A		Unknown	5	Did not advance	
Harold Annison; Edward Peter; Leslie Savage; Henry Taylor	4 × 200 m free relay	N/A		10:51.0	1 Q	10:37.2	3rd place, bronze medalist(s)

Women

Swimmer	Event	Semifinals		Final	
Swimmer	Event	Result	Rank	Result	Rank
Lillian Birkenhead	100 m free	Unknown	6	Did not advance	
Hilda James	300 m free	5:07.2	4	Did not advance	
Constance Jeans	100 m free	1:20.8	2 Q	1:22.8	4
Constance Jeans	300 m free	4:57.8	2 Q	4:52.4	4
Grace McKenzie	100 m free	1:27.4	3	Did not advance	
Grace McKenzie	300 m free	Unknown	4	Did not advance	
Charlotte Radcliffe	100 m free	Unknown	7	Did not advance	
Florence Sancroft	300 m free	Unknown	5	Did not advance	
Hilda James; Constance Jeans; Grace McKenzie; Charlotte Radcliffe	4 × 100 m free relay	N/A		5:40.8	2nd place, silver medalist(s)

=== Water polo ===
Great Britain competed in the Olympic water polo tournament for the fourth time in 1920, the fifth appearance of the sport in the Olympics. Britain won its fourth (and final, through 2008) gold medal in the sport.

The Bergvall System was used in 1920. Great Britain won all three of its matches, taking the gold medal.

Quarterfinals

Great Britain	9–0	Spain	Antwerp

Semifinals

Great Britain	7–2	United States	Antwerp

Final

Great Britain	3–2	Belgium	Antwerp

Final rank
(gold) Gold

== Athletics ==
41 athletes represented Great Britain in 1920. It was the nation's sixth appearance in athletics, having competed in the sport at every Olympics. With four medals of each type, Great Britain was the third most successful nation in athletics, behind the United States and Finland.

Ranks given are within the heat.

Athlete	Event	Heats		Quarterfinals		Semifinals		Final	
Athlete	Event	Result	Rank	Result	Rank	Result	Rank	Result	Rank
Harold Abrahams	100 m	11.0	1 Q	11.0	4	Did not advance			
Harold Abrahams	200 m	23.3	2 Q	23.0	3	Did not advance			
Harold Abrahams	Long jump	6.05	20	—				Did not advance	
John Ainsworth-Davis	400 m	51.5	2 Q	50.7	2 Q	49.9	3 Q	50.6	5
Benjamin Howard Baker	Triple jump	13.675	8	—				Did not advance	
Benjamin Howard Baker	High jump	1.80	1 Q	—				1.85	6
Joe Blewitt	5000 m	—				15:19.8	1 Q	15:19.0	5
Guy Butler	400 m	53.2	2 Q	50.7	2 Q	50.2	2 Q	50.1	2nd place, silver medalist(s)
Timothy Carroll	High jump	1.80	1 Q	—				1.75	9
Charles Clibbon	10000 m	—				32:08.8	2 Q	Did not finish	
Laurence Cummins	Cross country	—							26
Victor d'Arcy	100 m	11.1	2 Q		3	Did not advance			
Victor d'Arcy	200 m	24.0	3	Did not advance					
Charles Dowson	3 km walk	—				13:54.9	4 Q	13:28.0	6
Charles Dowson	10 km walk	—				Did not finish		Did not advance	
Eric Dunbar	110 m hurdles	—			4	Did not advance			
Eric Dunbar	High jump	1.70	14	—				Did not advance	
Harry Edward	100 m	10.9	2 Q	10.8	1 Q	10.8	1 Q	10.9	3rd place, bronze medalist(s)
Harry Edward	200 m	22.8	1 Q	22.0	1 Q	22.5	2 Q	22.2	3rd place, bronze medalist(s)
Walter Freeman	Cross country	—							22
George Gray	110 m hurdles	—			2 Q		4	Did not advance	
George Gray	400 m hurdles	—		58.8	3	Did not advance			
Charles Gunn	3 km walk	—					5 Q	13:34.0	10
Charles Gunn	10 km walk	—				48:22.0	5 Q	49:43.9	3rd place, bronze medalist(s)
James Hatton	10000 m	—				32:23.0	5 Q	32:14.0	5
Anton Hegarty	Cross country	—						27:57.0	5
William Hehir	3 km walk	—					5 Q	13:29.8	7
William Hehir	10 km walk	—				51:33.8	1 Q	50:11.8	5
Albert Hill	800 m	—		1:56.2	2 Q	1:56.4	1 Q	1:53.4	1st place, gold medalist(s)
Albert Hill	1500 m	—				4:03.2	2 Q	4:01.8	1st place, gold medalist(s)
William Hill	100 m	11.0	1 Q	11.0	1 Q	11.3	5	Did not advance	
William Hill	200 m	23.8	2 Q	23.2	3	Did not advance			
Percy Hodge	3000 m steeplechase	—				10:17.4 OR	1 Q	10:00.4 OR	1st place, gold medalist(s)
Leslie Housden	Marathon	—						3:14:25.0	31
William Hunter	110 m hurdles	—			2 Q		5	Did not advance	
William Hunter	Long jump	6.42	13	—				Did not advance	
William Hunter	High jump	No mark	21	—				Did not advance	
Herbert Irwin	5000 m	—				15:17.8	2 Q		12
Robert Lindsay	400 m	52.0	1 Q	51.6	4	Did not advance			
Charles Lively	Long jump	5.87	22	—				Did not advance	
Charles Lively	Triple jump	13.15	14	—				Did not advance	
Duncan McPhee	1500 m	—				4:07.2	2 Q	Did not finish	
Arthur Mills	Marathon	—						2:48:05.0	14
Edgar Mountain	800 m	—		1:57.6	1 Q	1:58.2	2 Q	1:53.7	4
Alfred Nichols	5000 m	—				15:54.0	4 Q	15:24.0	8
Alfred Nichols	Cross country	—						28:20.0	12
Tom Nicolson	Hammer throw	45.70	6	—				45.70	6
Philip Noel-Baker	800 m	—		1:56.0	1 Q	Did not start		Did not advance	
Philip Noel-Baker	1500 m	—				4:14.0	2 Q	4:02.4	2nd place, silver medalist(s)
George Piper	Marathon	—						3:02:10.0	29
Eric Robertson	Marathon	—						3:55:00.0	35
William Seagrove	5000 m	—				15:53.6	3 Q	15:21.06	6
Christopher Vose	Cross country	—							19
Edward Wheller	400 m hurdles	—		58.4	2 Q		4	Did not advance	
James Wilson	10000 m	—				33:40.2	1 Q	31:50.8	3rd place, bronze medalist(s)
James Wilson	Cross country	—						27:45.2	4
Hedges Worthington-Eyre	400 m	52.6	2 Q	53.2	5	Did not advance			
Frank Hegarty; Alfred Nichols; James Wilson	Team cross country	—						21	2nd place, silver medalist(s)
Harold Abrahams; Denis Black; Victor d'Arcy; William Hill	4 × 100 m relay	—				43.3	2 Q	43.0	4
John Ainsworth-Davis; Guy Butler; Cecil Griffiths; Robert Lindsay	4 × 400 m relay	—				3:40.9	2 Q	3:22.2	1st place, gold medalist(s)
Joe Blewitt; Albert Hill; Duncan McPhee; William Seagrove	3000 m team	—				11	1 Q	20	2nd place, silver medalist(s)

== Boxing ==
16 boxers represented Great Britain at the 1920 Games. It was the nation's second appearance in boxing. Great Britain was one of two countries to send two boxers in each of the eight weight classes, along with the United States. The British boxers won a total of six medals, one more than Canada and two more than the United States, but fell behind the Americans in number of gold medals three to two.

Boxer	Weight class	Round of 32	Round of 16	Quarterfinals	Semifinals	Final / Bronze match	
Boxer	Weight class	Opposition Score	Opposition Score	Opposition Score	Opposition Score	Opposition Score	Rank
Frederick Adams	Featherweight	Bye	Erdal (NOR); L	Did not advance			9
Daniel Bowling	Bantamweight	N/A	Hartman (USA); L	Did not advance			9
Hugh Brown	Light heavyweight	N/A	Bye	Andreasen (DEN); W	Sørsdal (NOR); L	Franks (GBR); L	4
James Cater	Featherweight	Bye	Nielsen (DEN); W	Garzena (ITA); L	Did not advance		5
William Cuthbertson	Flyweight	N/A	Jensen (DEN); W	Zegwaard (NED); W	Pedersen (DEN); L	Albert (FRA); W	3rd place, bronze medalist(s)
Frank Dove	Heavyweight	N/A	Bye	Petersen (DEN); L	Did not advance		5
Harold Franks	Light heavyweight	N/A	Bye	Piochelle (FRA); W	Eagan (USA); L	Brown (GBR); W	3rd place, bronze medalist(s)
James Gilmour	Lightweight	N/A	Sæterhaug (NOR); L	Did not advance			9
Frederick Grace	Lightweight	N/A	Nak (NED); W	Mosberg (USA); L	Did not advance		5
Alexander Ireland	Welterweight	Bye	Reichenbach (SUI); W	Suhr (DEN); W	Clark (USA); W	Schneider (CAN); L	2nd place, silver medalist(s)
Harry Mallin	Middleweight	Bye	Cranston (USA); W	Lagonia (USA); W	Herscovitch (CAN); W	Prud'Homme (CAN); W	1st place, gold medalist(s)
George McKenzie	Bantamweight	N/A	Bye	Koss (NOR); W	Walker (RSA); L	Hébrans (BEL); W	3rd place, bronze medalist(s)
Ronald Rawson	Heavyweight	N/A	Bye	Stewart (USA); W	Eluère (FRA); W	Petersen (DEN); W	1st place, gold medalist(s)
Frederic Virtue	Flyweight	N/A	Zegwaard (NED); L	Did not advance			9
Frederick Whitbread	Welterweight	Bye	Gillet (FRA); L	Did not advance			9
Edward White	Middleweight	Bye	Olsen (DEN); L	Did not advance			9

Opponent nation	Wins	Losses	Percent
Belgium	1	0	1.000
Canada	2	1	.667
Denmark	5	3	.625
France	3	1	.750
Italy	0	1	.000
Netherlands	2	1	.667
Norway	1	3	.250
South Africa	0	1	.000
Switzerland	1	0	1.000
United States	4	3	.571
Total international	19	14	.576
Great Britain	1	1	.500
Total	20	15	.571

Round	Wins	Losses	Percent
Round of 32	0	0	–
Round of 16	5	6	.455
Quarterfinals	7	3	.700
Semifinals	3	4	.429
Final	2	1	.667
Bronze match	3	1	.750
Total	20	15	.571

== Cycling ==
Thirteen cyclists represented Great Britain in 1920. It was the nation's fourth appearance in the sport. Great Britain was one of six different nations to win a gold medal in the six cycling events; the British team also took three silvers and one bronze to make the nation the most successful cycling team in 1920. All of Great Britain's medals came in track cycling, with the gold coming from Lance and Ryan's tandem.

=== Road cycling ===
Cyclist	Event	Final	
Cyclist	Event	Result	Rank
William Genders	Time trial	4:50:23.6	9
David Marsh	Time trial	5:09:23.6	26
Leon Meredith	Time trial	4:58:55.6	18
Edward Newell	Time trial	Did not finish	
William Genders; David Marsh; Leon Meredith; Edward Newell	Team time trial	Did not finish	

=== Track cycling ===
Ranks given are within the heat.

Cyclist	Event	Heats		Quarterfinals		Repechage semis		Repechage final		Semifinals		Final	
Cyclist	Event	Result	Rank	Result	Rank	Result	Rank	Result	Rank	Result	Rank	Result	Rank
Cyril Alden	50 km	N/A										Unknown	2nd place, silver medalist(s)
Thomas Harvey	50 km	N/A										Unknown	8
Horace Johnson	Sprint	12.6	1 Q	11.8	1 Q	Advanced directly				14.8	1 Q	15.1	2nd place, silver medalist(s)
Horace Johnson	50 km	N/A										Did not finish	
Thomas Lance	Sprint	13.2	1 Q	Unknown	3 R	Unknown	4	Did not advance					
Harry Ryan	Sprint	13.2	1 Q	12.8	1 Q	Advanced directly				12.6	1 Q	15.1	3rd place, bronze medalist(s)
William Stewart	50 km	N/A										Unknown	8
Albert White	Sprint	Unknown	2 Q	12.6	1 Q	Advanced directly				15.3	3	Did not advance	
Cyril Alden; William Stewart	Tandem	N/A		15.6	1 Q	N/A				Unknown	2 B	Unknown	4
Thomas Lance; Harry Ryan	Tandem	N/A		12.0	1 Q	N/A				11.6	1 Q	11.2	1st place, gold medalist(s)
Henry Lee; William Ormston	Tandem	N/A		Unknown	3	N/A				15.3	3	Did not advance	
Cyril Alden; Thomas Harvey; Horace Johnson; Henry Lee; William Stewart; Albert White	Team pursuit	N/A		5:23.8	1 Q	N/A				5:14.0	1 Q	5:13.8	2nd place, silver medalist(s)

== Fencing ==
Eighteen fencers represented Great Britain in 1920. It was the nation's fourth appearance in the sport. The British team's best individual result came from its only event finalist, Dalglish, who placed eighth in the sabre. The foil team placed fifth for the best overall result for Britain.

Ranks given are within the group.

Fencer	Event	First round		Quarterfinals		Semifinals		Final	
Fencer	Event	Result	Rank	Result	Rank	Result	Rank	Result	Rank
John Blake	Épée	4–5	6	Did not advance					
George Burt	Épée	1–6	8	Did not advance					
Ronald Campbell	Épée	3–5	7	Did not advance					
Ronald Campbell	Sabre	N/A		3–4	5	Did not advance			
Robin Dalglish	Épée	4–4	4 Q	1–9	11	Did not advance			
Robin Dalglish	Sabre	N/A		5–2	2 Q	3–3	4 Q	5–6	8
Philip Doyne	Foil	N/A		2–4	4	Did not advance			
Martin Holt	Épée	3–5	7	Did not advance					
Herbert Huntington	Sabre	N/A		5–3	4 Q	1–5	6	Did not advance	
H. Evan James	Foil	N/A		2–6	7	Did not advance			
Cecil Kershaw	Foil	N/A		0–6	7	Did not advance			
Cecil Kershaw	Sabre	N/A		3–3	3 Q	2–4	6	Did not advance	
Alfred Martin	Sabre	N/A		Did not finish		Did not advance			
Robert Montgomerie	Épée	3–6	7	Did not advance					
Robert Montgomerie	Foil	N/A		2–6	8	Did not advance			
Charles Notley	Épée	2–6	8	Did not advance					
Edgar Seligman	Foil	N/A		2–3	4	Did not advance			
Eric Startin	Sabre	N/A		1–6	7	Did not advance			
Thomas Wand-Tetley	Foil	N/A		2–3	4	Did not advance			
Roland Willoughby	Épée	3–4	5 Q	2–8	10	Did not advance			
Roland Willoughby	Foil	N/A		3–3	4	Did not advance			
Jack Blake; George Burt; Martin Holt; Robert Montgomerie; Barry Notley; Edgar Seligman	Team épée	N/A				1–4	4	Did not advance	
Philip Doyne; Evan James; Cecil Kershaw; Robert Montgomerie; Edgar Seligman; Roland Willoughby	Team foil	N/A				2–3	3 Q	0–4	5
Ronald Campbell; Robin Dalglish; William Hammond; Herbert Huntington; Cecil Kershaw; William Marsh; Alfred Ridley-Martin	Team sabre	N/A						1–6	6

== Field hockey ==
Great Britain competed in field hockey for the second time, fielding a single team this time. The team took the gold medal in the four-team round robin, defeating each of the other three teams.

Team	Event	Final	
Team	Event	Result	Rank
Great Britain men's national field hockey team	Field hockey	3–0	1st place, gold medalist(s)

== Football ==
Great Britain competed in the Olympic football tournament for the fourth time, having missed only the 1904 tournament. The country had won gold medals in each of its first three appearances while going undefeated. The team's streak was abruptly halted in 1920, however, with a stunning first round loss to Norway.

First round

August 28, 1920

Norway	3–1	Great Britain
Gundersen 13' 51'; Wilhelms 63'	Report	Nicholas 25'

Olympisch Stadion, Antwerp
Attendance: 5,000
Referee: Johannes Mutters (NED)

Final rank
10th

== Gymnastics ==
Twenty-seven gymnasts represented Great Britain in 1920. It was the nation's fifth appearance in the sport, matched only by France. The British squad included only one team, with no gymnasts competing in the individual all-around. The team came in last place of the five competing countries.

=== Artistic gymnastics ===
Gymnast	Event	Final	
Gymnast	Event	Result	Rank
Sidney Andrew; Albert Betts; A. G. Cocksedge; J. Cotterell; William Cowhig; Sidney Cross; Horace Dawswell; J. E. Dingley; S. Domville; H. W. Doncaster; R. E. Edgecombe; W. Edwards; Henry John Finchett; Bernard Franklin; J. Harris; Samuel Hodgetts; Stanley Leigh; George Masters; Ronald McLean; Oliver Morris; E. P. Ness; A. E. Page; A. O. Pinner; Teddy Pugh; H. W. Taylor; John Walker; Ralph H. Yandell	Team	290.115	5

== Modern pentathlon ==
Four pentathletes represented Great Britain in 1920. It was the nation's second appearance in the sport, having competed in both instances of the Olympic pentathlon.

A point-for-place system was used, with the lowest total score winning.

Pentathlete	Final						
Pentathlete	Riding	Fencing	Shooting	Swimming	Running	Total	Rank
John Boustead	15	11	12	16	7	66	15
Edward Clarke	17	14	15	10	12	60	11
Edward Gedge	16	6	11	18	16	78	21
Thomas Wand-Tetley	22	15	8	17	9	69	17

== Polo ==
Great Britain competed in the Olympic polo tournament for the third time, the only nation to have competed in each edition of the competition to that point (and, eventually, the entire time polo was played at the Olympics). Great Britain fielded a single team in 1920, as opposed to 1900 and 1908, when the country had players on six of the eight teams to play. The British team nevertheless took another gold medal, defeating Belgium in the semifinals and Spain in the final.

Semifinals

Great Britain	8–3	Belgium

Final

Spain	11–13	Great Britain

Final rank
(gold) Gold

== Rowing ==
Ten rowers represented Great Britain in 1920. It was the nation's fourth appearance in the sport. Both of the British boats earned silver medals; in each instance, it was an American boat which beat Great Britain's representative in the final.

Ranks given are within the heat.

Rower	Cox	Event	Quarterfinals		Semifinals		Final	
Rower	Cox	Event	Result	Rank	Result	Rank	Result	Rank
Jack Beresford	N/A	Single sculls	7:45.0	1 Q	7:45.0	1 Q	7:36.0	2nd place, silver medalist(s)
Ewart Horsfall; Guy Oliver Nickalls; Richard Lucas; Walter James; John Campbell; Sebastian Earl; Ralph Shove; Sidney Swann	Robin Johnstone	Eight	6:19.0	1 Q	6:26.4	1 Q	6:05.8	2nd place, silver medalist(s)

== Sailing ==
Six sailors represented Great Britain in 1920. It was the nation's third appearance in the sport. Britain had the only female sailor of 1920. Both of the nation's boats took gold medals, without competition in the 18 foot class and over a Norwegian team in the 7 metre.

Sailors	Class	Race 1		Race 2		Race 3		Total	
Sailors	Class	Result	Rank	Result	Rank	Result	Rank	Score	Rank
Robert Coleman; William Maddison; Cyril Wright; Dorothy Wright	7 metre	Unknown							1st place, gold medalist(s)

== Skating ==
=== Figure skating ===
Six figure skaters represented Great Britain in 1920. It was the nation's second appearance in the sport; Great Britain was one of three countries to compete in both Summer Olympics figure skating competitions. The British team was able to capture only a single bronze medal in 1920.

Skater	Event	Final	
Skater	Event	Result	Rank
Kenneth Beaumont	Men's singles	59.0	9
Phyllis Johnson	Ladies' singles	18.5	4
Basil Williams	Men's singles	49.5	7
Phyllis Johnson; Basil Williams	Pairs	25.0	3rd place, bronze medalist(s)
Ethel Muckelt; Sydney Wallwork	Pairs	34.0	5
Kenneth Beaumont; Madeleine Beaumont	Pairs	55.0	8

== Shooting ==
Seven shooters represented Great Britain in 1920. It was the nation's fifth appearance in the sport; France was one of three nations (along with Denmark and France) to have competed at each Olympic shooting contest to that point. The British shooters were unable to secure a medal for the first time since 1900.

Shooter	Event	Final	
Shooter	Event	Result	Rank
Enoch Jenkins	Trap	Unknown	
George Whitaker	Trap	79	12
William Ellicott; William Grosvenor; Harold Humby; Charles Palmer; Ernest Pocock; George Whitaker	Team clay pigeons	488	4

== Tennis ==
Eight tennis players, four men and four women, competed for Great Britain in 1920. It was the nation's fifth appearance in the sport, tied with France for the most of any country. The doubles competitions were Great Britain's strength, with both gold medals coming from pairs—men's and women's. The country added a pair of silver medals in the women's and mixed doubles. The British players also took a pair of medals in the women's singles; Holman took silver and McKane won the bronze.

Player	Event	Round of 64	Round of 32	Round of 16	Quarterfinals	Semifinals	Finals	Rank
Player	Event	Opposition Score	Opposition Score	Opposition Score	Opposition Score	Opposition Score	Opposition Score	Rank
Alfred Beamish	Men's singles	Woffek (TCH); W 6–1, 6–3, 6–4	Ardelt (TCH); W 6–2, 6–4, 6–3	Alonso (ESP); L 6–1, 5–7, 5–7, 6–3, 6–1	Did not advance			9
Geraldine Beamish	Women's singles	N/A	Bye	Holman (GBR); L 8–6, 6–2	Did not advance			9
Edith Holman	Women's singles	N/A	Bye	Beamish (GBR); W 8–6, 6–2	Arendt (BEL); W 6–2, 6–3	McKane (GBR); W	Lenglen (FRA); L 6–3, 6–0	2nd place, silver medalist(s)
Francis Lowe	Men's singles	Bye	Zerlentis (GRE); W 14–12, 8–10, 7–5, 6–4	Colombo (ITA); W 6–4, 6–0, 2–6, 7–5	Winslow (RSA); L 6–4, 3–6, 6–4, 4–6, 6–2	Did not advance		5
Kathleen McKane	Women's singles	N/A	Vaussard (FRA); W 6–4, 6–4	Gagliardi (ITA); W 6–1, 1–6, 6–2	D'Ayen (FRA); W 6–2, 6–3	Holman (GBR); L	Fick (SWE); W 6–2, 6–0	3rd place, bronze medalist(s)
Winifred McNair	Women's singles	N/A	Bye	Lenglen (FRA); L 6–0, 6–0	Did not advance			9
Oswald Turnbull	Men's singles	Bye	Bye	Balbi (ITA); W 3–6, 6–3, 6–0, 6–8, 6–2	Alonso (ESP); W 0–6, 7–5, 4–6, 6–3, 7–5	Raymond (RSA); L 5–7, 6–4, 7–5, 6–4	Winslow (RSA); L	4
Max Woosnam	Men's singles	Müller (SWE); W 3–6, 6–1, 6–3, 6–3	Alonso (ESP); L 6–1, 2–6, 6–1, 6–3	Did not advance				17
Alfred Beamish; Francis Lowe	Men's doubles	N/A	Blackbeard & Dodd (RSA); L 6–1, 10–8, 6–3	Did not advance				17
Alfred Beamish; Geraldine Beamish	Mixed doubles	N/A	McNair & Turnbull (GBR); W 4–6, 6–4, 7–5	Décugis & Lenglen (FRA); L 6–2, 6–0	Did not advance			9
Geraldine Beamish; Edith Holman	Women's doubles	N/A	N/A	Bye	de Borman & Tschaggeny (BEL); W 6–2, 6–4	Arendt & Storms (BEL); W 6–1, 6–1	McKane & McNair (GBR); L 8–6, 6–4	2nd place, silver medalist(s)
Edith Holman; Francis Lowe	Mixed doubles	N/A	McKane & Woosnam (GBR); L 7–5, 8–6	Did not advance				14
Kathleen McKane; Winifred McNair	Women's doubles	N/A	N/A	Bye	Chaudoir & Dupont (BEL); W 6–2, 7–5	d'Ayen & Lenglen (FRA); W 2–6, 3–6, 8–6	Beamish & Holman (GBR); W 8–6, 6–4	1st place, gold medalist(s)
Kathleen McKane; Max Woosnam	Mixed doubles	N/A	Holman & Lowe (GBR); W 7–5, 8–6	d'Ayen & Hirsch (FRA); W 6–4, 6–2	Bye	Skrbková & Žemla-Rázný (TCH); W 9–7, 6–3	Décugis & Lenglen (FRA); L 6–4, 6–2	2nd place, silver medalist(s)
Winifred McNair; Oswald Turnbull	Mixed doubles	N/A	Beamish; Beamish (GBR); L 4–6, 6–4, 7–5	Did not advance				14
Oswald Turnbull; Max Woosnam	Men's doubles	N/A	Bye	Týř & Woffek (TCH); W 6–1, 6–2, 6–3	Balbi & Colombo (ITA); W 6–2, 6–8, 6–1, 6–3	Albarran & Décugis (FRA); W 4–6, 6–4, 6–3, 10–8	Kashio & Kumagai (JPN); W 6–2, 5–7, 7–5, 7–5	1st place, gold medalist(s)

Opponent nation	Wins	Losses	Percent
Belgium	4	0	1.000
Czechoslovakia	4	0	1.000
France	5	4	.556
Greece	1	0	1.000
Italy	4	0	1.000
Japan	1	0	1.000
South Africa	0	4	.000
Spain	1	2	.333
Sweden	2	0	1.000
Total international	22	10	.688
Great Britain	5	5	.500
Total	27	15	.643

Round	Wins	Losses	Percent
Round of 64	2	0	1.000
Round of 32	5	4	.556
Round of 16	6	4	.600
Quarterfinals	6	1	.857
Semifinals	5	2	.714
Final	2	3	.400
Bronze match	1	1	.500
Total	27	15	.643

== Tug of war ==
Great Britain competed in the Olympic tug of war tournament for the third time in 1920, the final appearance of the sport in the Olympics. Along with Sweden and the United States, Great Britain's three appearances in the five Olympic tug of war tournaments were the most of any nation.

The Bergvall System was used in 1920. Great Britain won all three of its matches, taking the gold medal to become the only country to win two Olympic golds in the tug of war.

All matches were best-of-three pulls.

Quarterfinals

Great Britain	2–0	United States

Semifinals

Great Britain	2–0	Belgium

Final

Great Britain	2–0	Netherlands

Final rank
(gold) Gold

== Weightlifting ==
Two weightlifters represented Great Britain in 1920. It was the nation's second appearance in the sport, having competed in 1896 but not 1900.

Weightlifter	Event	Final	
Weightlifter	Event	Result	Rank
Percy Mills	67.5 kg	192.5	12
John Paine	60 kg	172.5	11

== Wrestling ==
Ten wrestlers competed for Great Britain in 1920. It was the nation's fourth appearance in the sport. The British wrestlers competed only in the freestyle, with two wrestlers in each weight class. Bernard and Wright took bronze medals; they were the only two Britons to get any wins at all, winning two matches apiece.

=== Freestyle ===
Wrestler	Event	Round of 32	Round of 16	Quarterfinals	Semifinals	Finals / Bronze match	Rank
Edgar Bacon	Middleweight	Bye	Penttala (FIN) (L)	Did not advance			9
Stanley Bacon	Middleweight	Bye	Frantz (USA) (L)	Did not advance			9
Bernard Bernard	Featherweight	N/A	Bye	Harrasse (FRA) (W)	Ackerly (USA) (L)	Shinde (IND) (W)	3rd place, bronze medalist(s)
Henry Inman	Featherweight	N/A	Bye	Shinde (IND) (L)	Did not advance		5
Frederick Mason	Heavyweight	N/A		Meyer (USA) (L)	Did not advance		5
Archie MacDonald	Heavyweight	N/A		Nilsson (SWE) (L)	Did not advance		5
William Wilson	Light heavyweight	N/A	Bye	Redman (USA) (L)	Did not advance		5
Noel Rhys	Light heavyweight	N/A	Westerlund (FIN) (L)	Did not advance			9
William Wilson	Light heavyweight	N/A	Bye	Redman (USA) (L)	Did not advance		5
Herbert Wright	Lightweight	N/A	Bye	Joudiou (FRA) (W)	Svensson (SWE) (L)	Thys (BEL) (W)	3rd place, bronze medalist(s)

Opponent nation	Wins	Losses	Percent
Belgium	1	0	1.000
Finland	0	2	.000
France	2	0	1.000
India	1	1	.500
Sweden	0	3	.000
United States	0	4	.000
Total	4	10	.286

Round	Wins	Losses	Percent
Round of 32	0	0	–
Round of 16	0	3	.000
Quarterfinals	2	5	.286
Semifinals	0	2	.000
Final	0	0	–
Bronze match	2	0	1.000
Total	4	10	.286
