= Italy at the 1920 Summer Olympics =

- IOC code: ITA
- NOC: Italian National Olympic Committee

in Antwerp
- Competitors: 174 (173 men, 1 woman) in 18 sports
- Flag bearer: Nedo Nadi
- Medals Ranked 7th: Gold 13 Silver 5 Bronze 5 Total 23

Summer Olympics appearances (overview)
- 1896; 1900; 1904; 1908; 1912; 1920; 1924; 1928; 1932; 1936; 1948; 1952; 1956; 1960; 1964; 1968; 1972; 1976; 1980; 1984; 1988; 1992; 1996; 2000; 2004; 2008; 2012; 2016; 2020; 2024

Other related appearances
- 1906 Intercalated Games

Italy competed at the 1920 Summer Olympics in Antwerp, Belgium. 174 competitors, 173 men and 1 woman, took part in 79 events in 18 sports.

== Medalists ==
=== Gold ===
Medal	Name	Sport	Event
Gold	Ugo Frigerio	Athletics	3 km walk
Gold	Ugo Frigerio	Athletics	10 km walk
Gold	Arnaldo Carli; Ruggero Ferrario; Franco Giorgetti; Primo Magnani	Cycling	Team pursuit
Gold	Tommaso Lequio di Assaba	Equestrian	Individual jumping
Gold	Nedo Nadi	Fencing	Foil
Gold	Nedo Nadi	Fencing	Sabre
Gold	Baldo Baldi; Tommaso Costantino; Aldo Nadi; Nedo Nadi; Abelardo Olivier; Oreste Puliti; Pietro Speciale; Rodolfo Terlizzi	Fencing	Team Foil
Gold	Antonio Allocchio; Tullio Bozza; Giovanni Canova; Tommaso Costantino; Andrea Marrazzi; Aldo Nadi; Nedo Nadi; Abelardo Olivier; Paolo Thaon di Revel; Dino Urbani	Fencing	Team Épée Fencing
Gold	Baldo Baldi; Federico Cesarano; Francesco Gargano; Aldo Nadi; Nedo Nadi; Oreste Puliti; Giorgio Santelli; Dino Urbani	Fencing	Team Sabre
Gold	Giorgio Zampori	Gymnastics	All-around
Gold	Arnaldo Andreoli; Ettore Bellotto; Pietro Bianchi; Fernando Bonatti; Luigi Cambiaso; Luigi Contessi; Carlo Costigliolo; Luigi Costigliolo; Giuseppe Domenichelli; Roberto Ferrari; Carlo Fregosi; Romualdo Ghiglione; Ambrogio Levati; Francesco Loi; Vittorio Lucchetti; Luigi Maiocco; Ferdinando Mandrini; Lorenzo Mangiante; Antonio Marovelli; Michele Mastromarino; Giuseppe Paris; Manlio Pastorini; Ezio Roselli; Paolo Salvi; Giovanni Tubino; Giorgio Zampori; Angelo Zorzi	Gymnastics	Team
Gold	Ercole Olgeni; Giovanni Scatturin; Guido De Felip	Rowing	Coxed pair
Gold	Filippo Bottino	Weightlifting	+82.5 kg

=== Silver ===
- Ettore Caffaratti, Garibaldi Spighi, Giulio Cacciandra and Carlo Asinari — Equestrian, Men's Team three-day event
- Alessandro Valerio — Equestrian, Individual jumping
- Aldo Nadi — Fencing, Men's Individual Sabre
- Pietro Annoni and Erminio Dones — Rowing, Men's double scull (2x)
- Pietro Bianchi — Weightlifting, Middleweight

=== Bronze ===
- Ernesto Ambrosini — Athletics, Men's 3000m steeplechase
- Valerio Arri — Athletics, Men's marathon
- Edoardo Garzena — Boxing, Featherweight
- Ettore Caffaratti — Equestrian, Individual three-day event
- Ettore Caffaratti, Giulio Cacciandra, Alessandro Alvisi and Carlo Asinari — Equestrian, Team jumping

== Aquatics ==
=== Diving ===
A single diver represented Italy in 1920. It was the nation's third appearance in the sport. De Sanctis was unable to advance past the first round in either of his two events.

Men

Ranks given are within the semifinal group.

Diver	Event	Semifinals			Final		
Diver	Event	Points	Score	Rank	Points	Score	Rank
Guglielmo De Sanctis	3 m springboard	29	451.35	6	Did not advance		
Guglielmo De Sanctis	Plain high dive	33	98.0	7	Did not advance		

=== Swimming ===
Four swimmers, all men, represented Italy in 1920. It was the nation's fourth appearance in the sport. None of the individual swimmers advanced to the finals, though the relay did advance before finishing fifth in the final.

Ranks given are within the heat.

Men

Swimmer	Event	Quarterfinals		Semifinals		Final	
Swimmer	Event	Result	Rank	Result	Rank	Result	Rank
Gilio Bisagno	400 m free	Unknown	6	Did not advance			
Gilio Bisagno	1500 m free	25:18.0	3	Did not advance			
Agostino Frassinetti	100 m free	1:11.8	1 Q	Unknown	4	Did not advance	
Mario Massa	100 m free	1:10.4	3	Did not advance			
Antonio Quarantotto	400 m free	Unknown	5	Did not advance			
Antonio Quarantotto	1500 m free	Unknown	4	Did not advance			
Gilio Bisagno; Agostino Frassinetti; Mario Massa; Antonio Quarantotto	4 × 200 m free relay	N/A		11:01.2	2 Q	Unknown	5

=== Water polo ===
Italy competed in the Olympic water polo tournament for the first time in 1920. The Bergvall System was in use at the time. Italy forfeited its round of 16 match with Spain, then was defeated by Greece in the bronze medal tournament.

- Squad

- Salvatore Cabella
- Ercole Boero
- Amilcare Beretta
- Luigi Burlando

- Achille Olivari
- Umberto Lungavia
- Angelo Vassallo
- Mario Boero

Round of 16

Spain	1–1	Italy	Antwerp

Italy forfeited the match.

Bronze medal quarterfinals

Greece	5–1	Italy	Antwerp

Final rank
11th

== Athletics ==
24 athletes represented Italy in 1920. It was the nation's fourth appearance in athletics. Frigerio gave the nation its first gold medals in the sport by winning both of the racewalking competitions. Italy's long-distance successes also included a bronze in the marathon and a bronze in the steeplechase. Overall, the nation placed fourth on the athletics medals leaderboard.

Ranks given are within the heat.

Athlete	Event	Heats		Quarterfinals		Semifinals		Final	
Athlete	Event	Result	Rank	Result	Rank	Result	Rank	Result	Rank
Ernesto Ambrosini	800 m	—N/a		1:59.4	4 Q	1:59.5	4	Did not advance	
Ernesto Ambrosini	3000 m steeplechase	—N/a				10:33.6	2 Q	10:32.0	3rd place, bronze medalist(s)
Valerio Arri	Marathon	—N/a						2:36:32.8	3rd place, bronze medalist(s)
Giuseppe Bernardoni	400 m	52.8	3	Did not advance					
Ettore Blasi	Marathon	—N/a						Did not finish	
Giuseppe Bonini	800 m	—N/a		1:58.8	2 Q	1:59.0	5	Did not advance	
Giuseppe Bonini	1500 m	—N/a					6	Did not advance	
Oprando Bottura	Javelin throw	42.70	17	—N/a				Did not advance	
Carlo Butti	Decathlon	—N/a						Did not finish	
Daciano Colbacchini	110 m hurdles	—N/a		15.6	1 Q		6	Did not advance	
Giorgio Croci	100 m	11.2	3	Did not advance					
Ugo Frigerio	3 km walk	—N/a				13:40.2 OR	1 Q	13:14.2 OR	1st place, gold medalist(s)
Ugo Frigerio	10 km walk	—N/a				47:06.4	1 Q	48:06.2	1st place, gold medalist(s)
Aurelio Lenzi	Shot put	12.325	13	—N/a				Did not advance	
Aurelio Lenzi	Discus throw	37.75	9	—N/a				Did not advance	
Costante Lussana	10000 m	—N/a					10	Did not advance	
Augusto Maccario	5000 m	—N/a				15:23.2	5	Did not advance	
Augusto Maccario	10000 m	—N/a				34:06.8	3 Q	32:02.0	4
Carlo Martinenghi	1500 m	—N/a				Did not start			
Carlo Martinenghi	5000 m	—N/a				Did not finish		Did not advance	
Carlo Martinenghi	3000 m steeplechase	—N/a				Did not finish		Did not advance	
Giovanni Orlandi	100 m		6	Did not advance					
Giovanni Orlandi	200 m	23.8	3	Did not advance					
Donato Pavesi	3 km walk	—N/a				13:46.8 OR	1 Q	Disqualified	
Donato Pavesi	10 km walk	—N/a				48:12.0	4 Q	Disqualified	
Antonio Persico	Marathon	—N/a						Did not finish	
Arturo Porro	800 m	—N/a				Did not advance			
Arturo Porro	1500 m	—N/a				4:09.0	2 Q	4:12.4	7
Mario Riccoboni	100 m	11.2	2 Q	11.5	5	Did not advance			
Mario Riccoboni	200 m		4	Did not advance					
Agide Simonazzi	400 m	53.0	3	Did not advance					
Agide Simonazzi	800 m	—N/a				Did not advance			
Carlo Speroni	5000 m	—N/a				15:27.6	1 Q	15:21.2	7
Carlo Speroni	10000 m	—N/a				32:13.1	4 Q	Did not finish	
Giovanni Tosi	400 m	52.6	4	Did not advance					
Giuseppe Tugnoli	Shot put	12.07	14	—N/a				Did not advance	
Vittorio Zucca	100 m	11.4	1 Q		5	Did not advance			
Ernesto Ambrosini; Augusto Maccario; Carlo Speroni	3000 m team	—N/a				25	3 Q	36	5
Giorgio Croci; Giovanni Orlandi; Mario Riccobono; Vittorio Zucca	4 × 100 m relay	—N/a				Disqualified		Did not advance	

== Boxing ==
Five boxers represented Italy at the 1920 Games. It was the nation's debut in boxing. Garzena had the best performance for Italy, taking all three of the nation's wins on his way to a bronze medal.

Boxer	Weight class	Round of 32	Round of 16	Quarterfinals	Semifinals	Final / Bronze match	
Boxer	Weight class	Opposition Score	Opposition Score	Opposition Score	Opposition Score	Opposition Score	Rank
Mariano Barbaresi	Heavyweight	N/A	Eluère (FRA); L	Did not advance			9
Dario Della Valle	Welterweight	Steen (NOR); L	Did not advance				17
Vincenzo Dell'Oro	Flyweight	N/A	Albert (FRA); L	Did not advance			9
Edoardo Garzena	Featherweight	Bye	Vincken (BEL); W	Cater (GBR); W	Fritsch (FRA); L	Zivic (USA); W	3rd place, bronze medalist(s)
Leo Giunchi	Lightweight	N/A	Van Muysen (BEL); L	Did not advance			9

Opponent nation	Wins	Losses	Percent
Belgium	1	1	.500
France	0	3	.000
Great Britain	1	0	1.000
Norway	0	1	.000
United States	1	0	1.000
Total	3	5	.375

Round	Wins	Losses	Percent
Round of 32	0	1	.000
Round of 16	1	3	.250
Quarterfinals	1	0	1.000
Semifinals	0	1	.000
Final	0	0	–
Bronze match	1	0	1.000
Total	3	5	.375

== Cycling ==
Twelve cyclists represented Italy in 1920. It was the nation's third appearance in the sport. Italy took its first Olympic cycling medal when its pursuit team won the gold. Italy also had three cyclists place in the top eight of the 50 kilometres event, though none was able to secure a medal.

=== Road cycling ===
Cyclist	Event	Final	
Cyclist	Event	Result	Rank
Camillo Arduino	Time trial	5:03:16.8	23
Pietro Bestetti	Time trial	5:02:15.0	21
Federico Gay	Time trial	4:57:21.8	16
Dante Ghindani	Time trial	5:21:50.4	32
Camillo Arduino; Pietro Bestetti; Federico Gay; Dante Ghindani	Team time trial	20:24:44.0	5

=== Track cycling ===
Ranks given are within the heat.

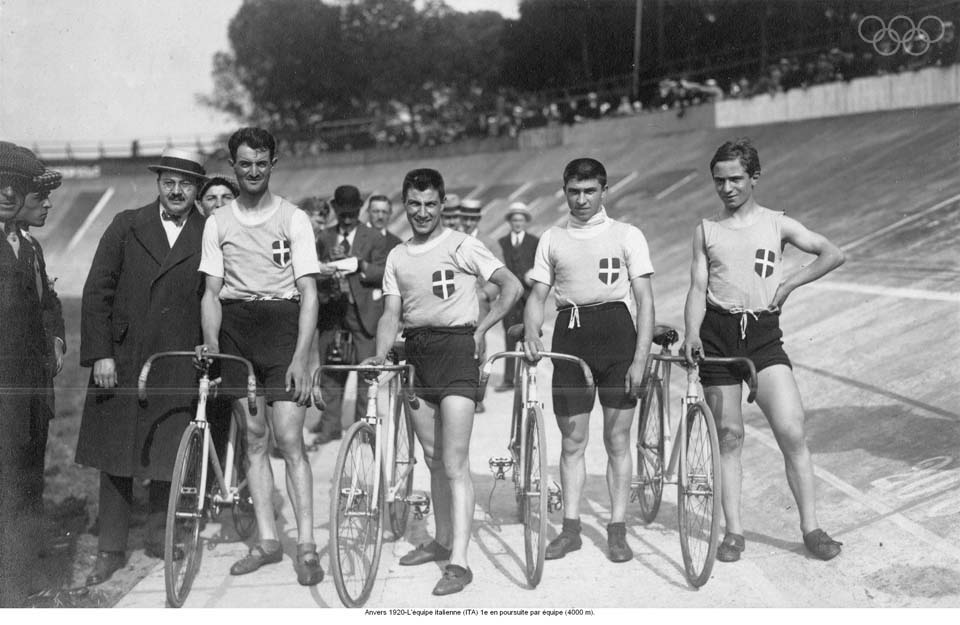
Italy won gold in the Men's team pursuit

Cyclist	Event	Heats		Quarterfinals		Repechage semis		Repechage final		Semifinals		Final	
Cyclist	Event	Result	Rank	Result	Rank	Result	Rank	Result	Rank	Result	Rank	Result	Rank
Vittorio Cavalotti	Sprint	Unknown	3	Did not advance									
Ruggero Ferrario	50 km	N/A										Unknown	4
Luigi Gilardi	50 km	N/A										Did not finish	
Francesco Giorgetti	Sprint	Unknown	2 Q	Unknown	2 R	Did not start		Did not advance					
Francesco Giorgetti	50 km	N/A										Unknown	6
Primo Magnani	50 km	N/A										Unknown	8
Pietro Martinelli	Sprint	Unknown	3	Did not advance									
Armido Rizzetto	Sprint	Unknown	3	Did not advance									
Arnaldo Carli; Ruggerio Ferrario; Franco Giorgetti; Primo Magnani	Team pursuit	N/A		6:20.0	1 Q	N/A				5:10.8	1 Q	5:14.2	1st place, gold medalist(s)

== Equestrian ==
Ten equestrians represented Italy in 1920. It was the nation's second appearance in the sport. The Italian equestrians were fairly successful, winning five medals to take third place on the equestrian leader board for the Games. Italians took the top two spots in the individual jumping competition, as well as a bronze in the individual eventing. The nation also earned a medal in each of the two team events in which it participated, a silver in the eventing and a bronze in jumping (which, by the rules of the day, had to consist of entirely different riders than the individual jumping event).

Equestrian	Horse	Event	Final	
Equestrian	Horse	Event	Result	Rank
Carlo Asinari	Savari	Eventing	1245.00	19
Emilio Benini	Passero	Jumping	13.00	19
Giulio Cacciandra	Facetto	Eventing	1353.75	14
Ettore Caffaratti	Caniche	Eventing	1733.75	3rd place, bronze medalist(s)
Santorre de Rossi di Santa Rosa	Neruccio	Jumping	7.00	7
Tommaso Lequio di Assaba	Trebecco	Jumping	2.00	1st place, gold medalist(s)
Garibaldi Spighi	Otello	Eventing	1647.50	5
Garibaldi Spighi	Virginia	Jumping	8.00	10
Ruggero Ubertalli	Proton	Jumping	10.25	17
Alessandro Valerio	Cento	Jumping	3.00	2nd place, silver medalist(s)
Alessandro Alvisi; Carlo Asinari; Giulio Cacciandra; Ettore Caffaratti	Raggio di Sole; Varone; Fortunello; Tradittore	Team jumping	18.75	3rd place, bronze medalist(s)
Carlo Asinari; Giulio Cacciandra; Ettore Caffaratti; Garibaldi Spighi	Savari; Facetto; Caniche; Otello	Team eventing	4735.00	2nd place, silver medalist(s)

== Fencing ==
Nineteen fencers represented Italy in 1920. It was the nation's fourth appearance in the sport. The Italian fencers took five of the six gold medals; the individual épée was the only event not won by an Italian (Italy's best result in that event was sixth place). Nedo Nadi took the individual gold medals in the foil and sabre; both he and his brother Aldo were on all three of the gold-medal teams. Aldo Nadi also took a silver medal in the individual sabre.

Ranks given are within the group.

Fencer	Event	First round		Quarterfinals		Semifinals		Final	
Fencer	Event	Result	Rank	Result	Rank	Result	Rank	Result	Rank
Olivier Abelardo	Épée	3–3	6 q	7–3	1 Q	6–5	2 Q	5–6	6
Olivier Abelardo	Foil	N/A		7–1	1 Q	4–1	2 Q	3–8	9
Baldo Baldi	Sabre	N/A		3–3	4 Q	5–1	2 Q	3–8	12
Aldo Boni	Épée	3–5	6	Did not advance					
Tullio Bozza	Épée	5–2	2 Q	5–5	7	Did not advance			
Giovanni Canova	Épée	3–5	5 Q	5–6	7	Did not advance			
Federico Cesarano	Foil	N/A		4–0	1 Q	0–5	6	Did not advance	
Federico Cesarano	Sabre	N/A		5–2	2 Q	5–1	1 Q	3–8	10
Tommaso Constantino	Foil	N/A		4–1	2 Q	2–3	4	Did not advance	
Francesco Gargano	Sabre	N/A		5–2	2 Q	3–3	3 Q	3–8	11
Aldo Nadi	Foil	N/A		6–0	1 Q	4–1	1 Q	6–5	5
Aldo Nadi	Sabre	N/A		6–1	1 Q	3–3	4 Q	9–2	2nd place, silver medalist(s)
Nedo Nadi	Foil	N/A		7–1	1 Q	5–0	1 Q	10–1	1st place, gold medalist(s)
Nedo Nadi	Sabre	N/A		5–1	1 Q	6–0	1 Q	11–0	1st place, gold medalist(s)
Oreste Puliti	Foil	N/A		4–1	2 Q	4–1	2 Q	5–6	7
Oreste Puliti	Sabre	N/A		6–1	1 Q	4–2	3 Q	6–5	4
Giulio Rusconi	Sabre	N/A		4–3	3 Q	3–3	5	Did not advance	
Giorgio Santelli	Sabre	N/A		5–3	3 Q	2–4	6	Did not advance	
Pietro Speciale	Foil	N/A		4–2	2 Q	2–3	3 Q	1–10	12
Rodolfo Terlizzi	Foil	N/A		2–4	4	Did not advance			
Paolo Thaon	Épée	3–6	7	Did not advance					
Dino Urbani	Épée	5–3	2 Q	6–4	3 Q	4–7	7	Did not advance	
Olivier Abelardo; Baldo Baldi; Tommaso Constantino; Aldo Nadi; Nedo Nadi; Oreste Puliti; Pietro Speciale; Rodolfo Terlizzi	Team foil	N/A				4–0	1 Q	4–0	1st place, gold medalist(s)
Antonio Allochio; Baldo Baldi; Frederico Cesarano; Francesco Gargano; Aldo Nadi; Nedo Nadi; Oreste Puliti; Giorgio Santelli; Dino Urbani	Team sabre	N/A						7–0	1st place, gold medalist(s)
Olivier Abelardo; Antonio Allochio; Tullio Bozza; Giovanni Canova; Tommaso Constantino; Andrea Marrazzi; Aldo Nadi; Nedo Nadi; Paolo Thaon; Dino Urbani	Team épée	N/A				3–1	2 Q	5–0	1st place, gold medalist(s)

== Football ==
Italy competed in the Olympic football tournament for the second time. The team beat Egypt in the first round before falling to France in the quarterfinals. In the tournament for second place, the Italians beat Norway before losing to Spain in the consolation semis.

Team Roster

- Piero Campelli
- Giuseppe Giaccone
- Antonio Bruna
- Renzo de Vecchi
- Virginio Rosetta
- Gracco de Nardo
- Ettore Reynaudi
- Mario Meneghetti
- Giuseppe Parodi
- Luigi Burlando
- Rinaldo Roggero
- Giustiniano Marucco
- Pio Ferraris
- Giuseppe Forlivesi
- Cesare Lovati
- Enrico Sardi
- Adolfo Baloncieri
- Emilio Badini
- Guglielmo Brezzi
- Aristodemo Santamaria
- Adevildo De Marchi

First round

August 28, 1920

Italy	2–1	Egypt
Baloncieri 25'; Brezzi 57'	Report	Osman 30'

Jules Ottenstadion, Ghent
Attendance: 2,000
Referee: Paul Putz (BEL)

Quarterfinals

August 29, 1920

France	3–1	Italy
Boyer 10'; Nicolas 14'; Bard 54'	Report	Brezzi 33' (pen.)

Olympisch Stadion, Antwerp
Attendance: 10,000
Referee: Henri Christophe (BEL)

Consolation first round

August 31, 1920

Italy	2–1	Norway
Sardi 46'; Badini 96'	Report	Andersen 41'

Broodstraat, Antwerp
Attendance: 500
Referee: Louis Fourgous (FRA)

Consolation semifinals

September 2, 1920

Spain	2–0	Italy
Sesúmaga 43' 72'	Report

Olympisch Stadion, Antwerp
Attendance: 10,000
Referee: Paul Putz (BEL)

Final rank
5th

== Gymnastics ==
Twenty-seven gymnasts represented Italy in 1920. It was the nation's fourth appearance in the sport. The Italians took gold medals in both of the events in which they competed, with Zampori taking the men's individual all-around and leading the Italians to a team gold. Italy did not compete in the free system or Swedish system team events.

=== Artistic gymnastics ===
Gymnast	Event	Final	
Gymnast	Event	Result	Rank
Luigi Costigliolo	All-around	84.90	8
Vittorio Lucchetti	All-around	80.12	18
Luigi Maiocco	All-around	85.38	7
Giorgio Zampori	All-around	88.35	1st place, gold medalist(s)
Angelo Zorzi	All-around	80.51	16
Arnaldo Andreoli; Ettore Bellotto; Pietro Bianchi; Fernando Bonatti; Luigi Cambiaso; Luigi Contessi; Carlo Costigliolo; Luigi Costigliolo; Giuseppe Domenichelli; Roberto Ferrari; Carlo Fregosi; Romualdo Ghiglione; Ambrogio Levati; Francesco Loi; Vittorio Lucchetti; Luigi Maiocco; Ferdinando Mandrini; Lorenzo Mangiante; Antonio Marovelli; Michele Mastromarino; Giuseppe Paris; Manlio Pastorini; Ezio Roselli; Paolo Salvi; Giovanni Tubino; Giorgio Zampori; Angelo Zorzi	Team	359.855	1st place, gold medalist(s)

== Modern pentathlon ==
A single pentathlete represented Italy in 1920. It was the nation's debut in the sport.

A point-for-place system was used, with the lowest total score winning.

Pentathlete	Final						
Pentathlete	Riding	Fencing	Shooting	Swimming	Running	Total	Rank
Adriano Lanza	21	19	11	21	19	91	22

== Rowing ==
Six rowers represented Italy in 1920. It was the nation's third appearance in the sport. Italian rowers reached the finals for the first time, winning the nation's first two Olympic rowing medals: a gold in the coxed pairs and a silver in the double sculls.

Ranks given are within the heat.

Rower	Cox	Event	Quarterfinals		Semifinals		Final	
Rower	Cox	Event	Result	Rank	Result	Rank	Result	Rank
Nino Castelli	N/A	Single sculls	7:59.0	2	Did not advance			
Pietro Annoni; Erminio Dones	N/A	Double sculls	N/A		7:25.4	1 Q	7:19.0	2nd place, silver medalist(s)
Ercole Olgeni; Giovanni Scatturin	Guido De Felip	Coxed pair	N/A		8:10.0	1 Q	7:56.0	1st place, gold medalist(s)

== Shooting ==
Ten shooters represented Italy in 1920. It was the nation's second appearance in the sport, and the first since 1896. Greece took a silver medal in the team military pistol, its first medal in shooting since 1896. Italy's best result was a fourth-place finish in the team standing military rifle.

Shooter	Event	Final	
Shooter	Event	Result	Rank
Peppy Campus	50 m small-bore rifle	Unknown	
Peppy Campus	300 m free rifle, 3 pos.	Unknown	
Raffaele Frasca	50 m small-bore rifle	Unknown	
Raffaele Frasca	300 m free rifle, 3 pos.	Unknown	
Alfredo Galli	50 m small-bore rifle	Unknown	
Alfredo Galli	300 m free rifle, 3 pos.	Unknown	
Franco Micheli	50 m small-bore rifle	Unknown	
Franco Micheli	300 m free rifle, 3 pos.	Unknown	
Ricardo Ticchi	50 m small-bore rifle	Unknown	
Ricardo Ticchi	300 m free rifle, 3 pos.	Unknown	
Ricardo Ticchi	300 m military rifle, standing	54	6
Giancarlo Boriani; Sem De Ranieri; Luigi Favretti; Camillo Isnardi; Riccardo Ticchi	300 m team military rifle, standing	251	4
Giancarlo Boriani; Raffaele Frasca; Alfredo Galli; Roberto Preda; Riccardo Ticchi	30 m team military pistol	1121	9
Giancarlo Boriani; Raffaele Frasca; Alfredo Galli; Roberto Preda; Riccardo Ticchi	50 m team free pistol	2224	7
Peppy Campus; Raffaele Frasca; Alfredo Galli; Camillo Isnardi; Riccardo Ticchi	300 m team military rifle, prone	272	9
Peppy Campus; Raffaele Frasca; Alfredo Galli; Camillo Isnardi; Riccardo Ticchi	600 m team military rifle, prone	257	12
Peppy Campus; Raffaele Frasca; Alfredo Galli; Franco Micheli; Riccardo Ticchi	50 m team small-bore rifle	1777	7
Peppy Campus; Raffaele Frasca; Alfredo Galli; Franco Micheli; Riccardo Ticchi	50 m team small-bore rifle	4371	9
Sem De Ranieri; Raffaele Frasca; Alfredo Galli; Camillo Isnardi; Riccardo Ticchi	300 & 600 m team military rifle, prone	527	9

== Tennis ==
Four tennis players, three men and one woman, competed for Italy in 1920. It was the nation's debut in the sport. Balbi and Colombo reached the quarterfinals in the men's doubles, the best result for Italy that year.

Player	Event	Round of 64	Round of 32	Round of 16	Quarterfinals	Semifinals	Finals	Rank
Player	Event	Opposition Score	Opposition Score	Opposition Score	Opposition Score	Opposition Score	Opposition Score	Rank
Mino Balbi	Men's singles	Bye	Flaquer (ESP); W 6–2, 6–4, 6–1	Turnbull (GBR); L 3–6, 6–3, 6–0, 6–8, 6–2	Did not advance			9
Alberto Bonacossa	Men's singles	von Braun (SWE); L 4–6, 6–1, 7–5, 6–2	Did not advance					32
Cesare Colombo	Men's singles	Bye	Nielsen (NOR); W 6–2, 6–3, 6–1	Lowe (GBR); L 6–4, 6–0, 2–6, 7–5	Did not advance			9
Rosetta Gagliardi	Women's singles	N/A	Lindberg (SWE); W 6–0	McKane (GBR); L 6–1, 1–6, 6–2	Did not advance			9
Mino Balbi; Cesare Colombo	Men's doubles	N/A	Bye	Simon & Syz (SUI); W 6–3, 7–5, 3–6, 6–4	Turnbull & Woosnam (GBR); L 6–2, 6–8, 6–1, 6–3	Did not advance		5
Cesare Colombo; Rosetta Gagliardi	Mixed doubles	N/A	Bye	Halot & Storms (BEL); L 8–6, 6–3	Did not advance			8

Opponent nation	Wins	Losses	Percent
Belgium	0	1	.000
Great Britain	0	4	.000
Norway	1	0	1.000
Spain	1	0	1.000
Sweden	1	1	.500
Switzerland	1	0	1.000
Total	4	6	.400

Round	Wins	Losses	Percent
Round of 64	0	1	.000
Round of 32	3	0	1.000
Round of 16	1	4	.200
Quarterfinals	0	1	.000
Semifinals	0	0	–
Final	0	0	–
Bronze match	0	0	–
Total	4	6	.400

== Tug of war ==
Italy competed in the Olympic tug of war tournament for the first time in 1920, the final appearance of the sport in the Olympics. The Bergvall System was used in 1920. Italy lost its first match in the semifinals to the Netherlands. Because the Dutch went on to win the silver medal, Italy received an opportunity to contest the bronze. In the bronze medal semifinals, the Italians lost again, this time to the United States, to finish fifth and last in the tournament.

All matches were best-of-three pulls.

Semifinals

Netherlands	2–0	Italy

Bronze medal semifinals

United States	2–0	Italy

Final rank
5th

== Weightlifting ==
Five weightlifters, one in each weight class, represented Italy in 1920. It was the nation's debut in the sport. No Italian weightlifter placed worse than sixth, with two winning medals (including Bottino's gold) and two others just missing with fourth-place finishes.

Weightlifter	Event	Final	
Weightlifter	Event	Result	Rank
Pietro Bianchi	75 kg	235.0	2nd place, silver medalist(s)
Filippo Bottino	+82.5 kg	265.0	1st place, gold medalist(s)
Luigi Gatti	60 kg	195.0	4
Gino Mattiello	82.5 kg	235.0	6
Giulio Monti	67.5 kg	230.0	4

== Wrestling ==
Eight wrestlers, all in the Greco-Roman style, competed for Italy in 1920. It was the nation's third appearance in the sport. None of the Italian wrestlers advanced past the quarterfinals, or qualified for the silver or bronze rounds.

=== Greco-Roman ===
Wrestler	Event	Round of 32	Round of 16	Quarterfinals	Semifinals	Finals	Rank
Wrestler	Event	Round of 32	Round of 16	Silver quarters	Silver semis	Silver match	Rank
Wrestler	Event	Round of 32	Round of 16	Bronze quarters	Bronze semis	Bronze match	Rank
Giorgio Calza	Heavyweight	Kraus (TCH) (W)	Vassboten (NOR) (L)	Did not advance			12
Giorgio Calza	Heavyweight	Kraus (TCH) (W)	Vassboten (NOR) (L)	Did not advance			12
Giorgio Calza	Heavyweight	Kraus (TCH) (W)	Vassboten (NOR) (L)	Did not advance			12
Giovanni Cardinale	Light heavyweight	Bye	Wahlem (BEL) (L)	Did not advance			10
Giovanni Cardinale	Light heavyweight	Bye	Wahlem (BEL) (L)	N/A	Did not advance		10
Giovanni Cardinale	Light heavyweight	Bye	Wahlem (BEL) (L)	N/A			10
Carlo Corsanego	Middleweight	Gorbière (FRA) (W)	Balej (TCH) (L)	Did not advance			13
Carlo Corsanego	Middleweight	Gorbière (FRA) (W)	Balej (TCH) (L)	Did not advance			13
Carlo Corsanego	Middleweight	Gorbière (FRA) (W)	Balej (TCH) (L)	Did not advance			13
Giuseppe Gorletti	Middleweight	Bye	Fältström (SWE) (L)	Did not advance			13
Giuseppe Gorletti	Middleweight	Bye	Fältström (SWE) (L)	Did not advance			13
Giuseppe Gorletti	Middleweight	Bye	Fältström (SWE) (L)	Did not advance			13
Enrico Porro	Featherweight	Bye	Svensson (SWE) (W)	Boumans (BEL) (L)	Did not advance		9
Enrico Porro	Featherweight	Bye	Svensson (SWE) (W)	N/A	Did not advance		9
Enrico Porro	Featherweight	Bye	Svensson (SWE) (W)	Did not advance			9
Walter Ranghieri	Lightweight	Swigart (USA) (L)	Did not advance	Did not advance			18
Walter Ranghieri	Lightweight	Swigart (USA) (L)	Did not advance	Did not advance			18
Walter Ranghieri	Lightweight	Swigart (USA) (L)	Did not advance	Did not advance			18
Bruto Testoni	Light heavyweight	Bye	Sint (NED) (L)	Did not advance			10
Bruto Testoni	Light heavyweight	Bye	Sint (NED) (L)	N/A	Did not advance		10
Bruto Testoni	Light heavyweight	Bye	Sint (NED) (L)	N/A			10
Piero Vaglio	Featherweight	Bye	Boumans (BEL) (L)	Did not advance			11
Piero Vaglio	Featherweight	Bye	Boumans (BEL) (L)	N/A	Did not advance		11
Piero Vaglio	Featherweight	Bye	Boumans (BEL) (L)	Did not advance			11

Opponent nation	Wins	Losses	Percent
Belgium	0	3	.000
Czechoslovakia	1	1	.500
France	1	0	1.000
Netherlands	0	1	.000
Norway	0	1	.000
Sweden	1	1	.500
United States	0	1	.000
Total	3	8	.273

Round	Wins	Losses	Percent
Round of 32	2	1	.667
Round of 16	1	6	.143
Quarterfinals	0	1	.000
Semifinals	0	0	–
Final	0	0	–
Silver quarterfinals	0	0	–
Silver semifinals	0	0	–
Silver match	0	0	–
Bronze quarterfinals	0	0	–
Bronze semifinals	0	0	–
Bronze match	0	0	–
Total	3	8	.273
