= Mangiante =

Mangiante is an Italian surname. Notable people with the surname include:

- Andrea Mangiante (born 1976), Italian water polo player
- Giovanni Mangiante (1893–1967), Italian gymnast
- Lorenzo Mangiante (1891–1936), Italian gymnast
