= Domenichelli =

Domenichelli is an Italian surname. Notable people with the surname include:

- Giuseppe Domenichelli (1887–1955), Italian gymnast
- Hnat Domenichelli (born 1976), Canadian-Swiss ice hockey player
