= Oliver Morris =

Oliver Morris may refer to:

- Oliver Morris (gymnast), English gymnast
- Oliver Morris (rugby), Welsh rugby footballer
