= Émile Martel =

Émile Martel may refer to:

- Émile Martel (gymnast) (1898-1951), French gymnast
- Émile Martel (writer) (1941–2023), Canadian diplomat and writer
