= Angelo Badini =

Italian Argentine footballer (1894-1921)

Personal information
- Date of birth: 23 September 1894
- Place of birth: Rosario, Santa Fe, Argentina
- Date of death: 12 February 1921 (aged 26)
- Place of death: Bologna, Italy
- Position: Midfielder

Senior career*
Years	Team	Apps	(Gls)
1913–1917	Bologna	28	(10)
1918–1919	US Milanese		
1919–1921	Bologna	24	(1)
- * Club domestic league appearances and goals

Angelo Badini (23 September 1894 – 12 February 1921) was an Italian Argentine professional footballer who played as a midfielder.

== Biography ==
He was born in Rosario, Santa Fe Argentina and had Argentine citizenship but could represent Italy internationally like his younger brother Emilio, thanks to his Bolognese parents.

== Club career ==
Badini played for 5 seasons with Bologna F.C. 1909.

== Personal life ==
Angelo Badini's older brother Emilio Badini and younger brothers Cesare Badini and Augusto Badini all played for Bologna. To distinguish them, Angelo was referred to as Badini I, Emilio as Badini II, Cesare as Badini III and Augusto as Badini IV.

== Death and legacy ==
He died on 12 February 1921 from sepsis. Sometime later the Stadio Sterlino was named after him. His remains rests at the Certosa di Bologna.
