= Georges Thurnherr =

French gymnast

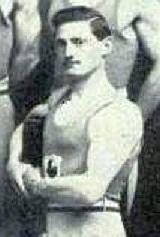
- Born: 16 April 1886 Eglingen, France
- Died: 6 April 1956 (aged 69) Belfort, France
- Height: 1.75 m (5 ft 9 in)

Gymnastics career
- Discipline: Men's artistic gymnastics
- Country represented: France
- Gym: La Belfortaine
Medal record
Men's artistic gymnastics
Representing France
Olympic Games
Bronze medal – third place	1920 Antwerp	Team

Georges Thurnherr (16 April 1886 – 6 April 1956) was a French gymnast who competed in the 1908 Summer Olympics and in the 1920 Summer Olympics. He was born in Eglingen and died in Belfort.

In 1908, he finished 18th in the all-around competition. Twelve years later, he was part of the French team, which won the bronze medal in the gymnastics men's team, European system event. In the all-around competition, he finished sixth.
