= Guglielmo Brezzi =

Italian footballer

Personal information
- Date of birth: 24 December 1898
- Place of birth: Alessandria, Italy
- Date of death: 7 April 1926 (aged 27)
- Place of death: Alessandria, Italy
- Position: Striker

Senior career*
Years	Team	Apps	(Gls)
1915–1916	Genoa	10	(12)
1919–1920	Genoa	19	(16)
1920–1923	Alessandria	59	(30)

International career
1920–1923	Italy	8	(5)
- * Club domestic league appearances and goals

Guglielmo Brezzi (Italian pronunciation: [ɡuʎˈʎɛlmo ˈbrettsi; ˈbreddzi]; 24 December 1898 – 7 April 1926) was an Italian professional footballer who played as a forward.

== Career ==
At club level, Brezzi played for Genoa C.F.C. and U.S. Alessandria Calcio 1912. Brezzi made his debut for the Italy national football team on 18 January 1920 in a game against France and scored a hat-trick in a 9–4 victory. He represented Italy at the 1920 Summer Olympics.
