= Antonio Bruna =

Italian footballer (1895-1976)

Personal information
- Date of birth: 14 February 1895
- Place of birth: Vercelli, Italy
- Date of death: 25 December 1976 (aged 81)
- Position: Defender

Senior career*
Years	Team	Apps	(Gls)
1919–1925	Juventus	97	(1)

International career
1920	Italy	5	(0)
- * Club domestic league appearances and goals

Antonio Bruna (Italian pronunciation: [anˈtɔːnjo ˈbruːna]; 14 February 1895 – 25 December 1976) was an Italian professional footballer who played as a defender.

== Career ==
Bruna was born in Vercelli. He played with Juventus for 6 seasons. Bruna made his debut for the Italy national football team on 13 May 1920 in a game against Netherlands. He represented Italy at the 1920 Summer Olympics and at the 1924 Summer Olympics.
