= Horace Dawswell =

British artistic gymnast (1896–1966)

- Full name: Horace Sydney Dawswell
- Born: 21 January 1896 Holborn, London, England
- Died: 11 January 1966 (aged 69) London, England

Gymnastics career
- Discipline: Men's artistic gymnastics
- Country represented: (United Kingdom) Great Britain

Horace Sydney Dawswell (21 January 1896 – 11 January 1966) was a gymnast who represent Great Britain at the 1920 Summer Olympics.

Dawswell was part of the gymnastic team that competed in the men's team event in Antwerp; the team finished fifth out of five teams.
