= Achille Olivari =

Italian water polo player

Personal information
- Nationality: Italian
- Born: 30 April 1894 Genova
- Died: Unknown

Sport
- Sport: Water polo

Achille Olivari (born 30 April 1894, date of death unknown) was an Italian water polo player. He competed in the men's tournament at the 1920 Summer Olympics.
