= Teddy Pugh =

Welsh gymnast (1878–1958)

- Full name: Edward Pugh
- Born: 8 December 1878 Bristol, England
- Died: 30 July 1958 (aged 79) Cardiff, Wales

Gymnastics career
- Discipline: Men's artistic gymnastics
- Country represented: (United Kingdom) Great Britain

Edward "Teddy" Pugh (8 December 1878 – 30 July 1958) was a Welsh gymnast. He competed in the men's team all-around event at the 1920 Summer Olympics.
