= Victor Duvant =

French gymnast

- Born: 3 March 1889 Valenciennes, France
- Died: 13 September 1963 (aged 74) Valenciennes, France

Gymnastics career
- Discipline: Men's artistic gymnastics
- Country represented: France
- Gym: Union Sportive Valenciennoise
Medal record
Men's artistic gymnastics
Representing France
Olympic Games
Bronze medal – third place	1920 Antwerp	Team

Victor Duvant (3 March 1889 – 13 September 1963) was a French gymnast who competed in the 1920 Summer Olympics.
