= Félicien Kempeneers =

Belgian gymnast (1890–1968)

- Born: 6 July 1890
- Died: 4 December 1968 (aged 78)

Gymnastics career
- Discipline: Men's artistic gymnastics
- Country represented: Belgium

Félicien Kempeneers (6 July 1890 – 4 December 1968) was a Belgian gymnast. He competed in the men's team all-around event at the 1920 Summer Olympics, winning the silver medal.
