= Gymnastics at the 1920 Summer Olympics – Men's team =

Men's team gymnastics at the Games of the VII Olympiad
- Venue: Olympisch Stadion
- Dates: 23–24 August 1920
- Competitors: 120 from 5 nations

Medalists
1st place, gold medalist(s)		Italy
2nd place, silver medalist(s)		Belgium
3rd place, bronze medalist(s)		France

The men's team was an artistic gymnastics event held as part of the gymnastics at the 1920 Summer Olympics programme. It was the fourth appearance of the event, which was one of three team gymnastics events held in 1920 (along with the free system team event and the Swedish system team event). The competition was held on Monday, 23 August 1920 and on Tuesday, 24 August 1920. Five teams competed, for a total of 120 gymnasts.

== Medalists ==
Gold	Silver	Bronze
Italy; Arnaldo Andreoli; Ettore Bellotto; Pietro Bianchi; Fernando Bonatti; Luigi Cambiaso; Luigi Contessi; Carlo Costigliolo; Luigi Costigliolo; Giuseppe Domenichelli; Roberto Ferrari; Carlo Fregosi; Romualdo Ghiglione; Ambrogio Levati; Francesco Loi; Vittorio Lucchetti; Luigi Maiocco; Ferdinando Mandrini; Lorenzo Mangiante; Antonio Marovelli; Michele Mastromarino; Giuseppe Paris; Manlio Pastorini; Ezio Roselli; Paolo Salvi; Giovanni Tubino; Giorgio Zampori; Angelo Zorzi	Belgium; Eugenius Auwerkerken; Théophile Bauer; François Claessens; Augustus Cootmans; Frans Gibens; Albert Haepers; Domien Jacob; Félicien Kempeneers; Jules Labéeu; Hubert Lafortune; Auguste Landrieu; Charles Lannie; Constant Loriot; Nicolaas Moerloos; Ferdinand Minnaert; Louis Stoop; Jean Van Guysse; Alphonse Van Mele; François Verboven; Jean Verboven; Julien Verdonck; Joseph Verstraeten; Georges Vivex; Julianus Wagemans	France; Georges Berger; Émile Bouchès; René Boulanger; Alfred Buyenne; Eugène Cordonnier; Léon Delsarte; Lucien Démanet; Paul Durin; Georges Duvant; Fernand Fauconnier; Arthur Hermann; Albert Hersoy; André Higelin; Auguste Hoël; Louis Quempe; Georges Lagouge; Paulin Lemaire; Ernest Lespinasse; Émile Boitelle; Jules Pirard; Eugène Pollet; Georges Thurnherr; Marco Torrès; François Walker; Julien Wartelle; Paul Wartelle

== Results ==
The competition was composed of five parts; exercises with instruments, horizontal bar, parallel bars, pommel horse, and hurdle exercise (four hurdles of 70 cm.). On the horizontal bar, parallel bars, and pommel horse, a compulsory and an optional exercise were performed. Maximum score was 404 points.

Final
Place	Team	Score
1	Italy	359.855
2	Belgium	346.765
3	France	340.100
4	Czechoslovakia	305.255
	Josef Bochníček; Ladislav Bubeníček; Josef Čada; Stanislav Indruch; Miroslav Klinger; Josef Malý; Zdeněk Opočenský; Josef Pagáč; František Pecháček; Robert Pražák; Václav Stolař; Svatopluk Svoboda; Ladislav Vácha; František Vaněček; Jaroslav Velda; Václav Wirt	
5	Great Britain	290.115
	Sidney Andrew; Albert Betts; Arthur Cocksedge; James Cotterell; William Cowhig; Sidney Cross; Horace Dawswell; J. E. Dingley; Sidney Domville; H. W. Doncaster; Reginald Edgecombe; Wyndham Edwards; Harry Finchett; Bernard Franklin; J. Harris; Samuel Hodgetts; Stanley Leigh; George Masters; Ronald McLean; Oliver Morris; Ted Ness; A. E. Page; Alfred Pinner; Teddy Pugh; H. W. Taylor; John Walker; Ralph Yandell	

== Sources ==
- Belgium Olympic Committee (1957). Olympic Games Antwerp 1920: Official Report (in French).
- Wudarski, Pawel (1999). "Wyniki Igrzysk Olimpijskich" (in Polish).
