= Wyndham Edwards =

Welsh gymnast (1892–1961)

- Born: 23 June 1892 Abertillery, Wales
- Died: 8 May 1961 (aged 68) Abergavenny, Wales

Gymnastics career
- Discipline: Men's artistic gymnastics
- Country represented: (United Kingdom) Great Britain

Wyndham Edwards (23 June 1892 – 8 May 1961) was a Welsh gymnast. He competed in the men's team all-around event at the 1920 Summer Olympics.
