= Roberto Ferrari (gymnast) =

Italian artistic gymnast

- Born: 7 December 1889 Medolla, Kingdom of Italy
- Died: 15 August 1937 (aged 47) Pré-Saint-Didier, Kingdom of Italy

Gymnastics career
- Discipline: Men's artistic gymnastics
- Country represented: Italy
Medal record
Men's artistic gymnastics
Representing Italy
Olympic Games
Gold medal – first place	1920 Antwerp	Team

Roberto Ferrari (7 December 1889 – 15 August 1937) was an Italian gymnast who competed in the 1920 Summer Olympics. He was born in Genoa. He was part of the Italian team, which was able to win the gold medal in the men's gymnastics team, European system event in 1920.
