= Reginald Edgecombe =

British gymnast (1885–1966)

- Born: 24 October 1885 Birmingham, England
- Died: 23 April 1966 (aged 80) Birmingham, England

Gymnastics career
- Discipline: Men's artistic gymnastics
- Country represented: (United Kingdom) Great Britain

Reginald Edgecombe (24 October 1885 – 23 April 1966) was a British gymnast. He competed in the men's team all-around event at the 1920 Summer Olympics.
