= Louis Stoop =

Belgian gymnast (1896–1970)

- Born: 11 May 1896
- Died: 6 November 1970 (aged 74)

Gymnastics career
- Discipline: Men's artistic gymnastics
- Country represented: Belgium

Louis Stoop (11 May 1896 – 6 November 1970) was a Belgian gymnast. He competed in the men's team all-around event at the 1920 Summer Olympics, winning the silver medal.
