= John Walker (gymnast) =

British gymnast (1883–1966)

- Full name: John Arthur Walker
- Born: 18 January 1883 Walsall, England
- Died: 22 March 1966 (aged 83) Birmingham, England

Gymnastics career
- Discipline: Men's artistic gymnastics
- Country represented: (United Kingdom) Great Britain

John Arthur Walker (18 January 1883 – 22 March 1966) was a British gymnast. He competed in the men's team all-around event at the 1920 Summer Olympics.
