= Théophile Bauer =

Belgian gymnast

Gymnastics career
- Discipline: Men's artistic gymnastics
- Country represented: Belgium

Théophile Bauer was a Belgian gymnast. He competed in the men's team all-around event at the 1920 Summer Olympics, winning the silver medal.
