= Eglingen =

Commune in Grand Est, France

Eglingen Eglìnge
- Commune
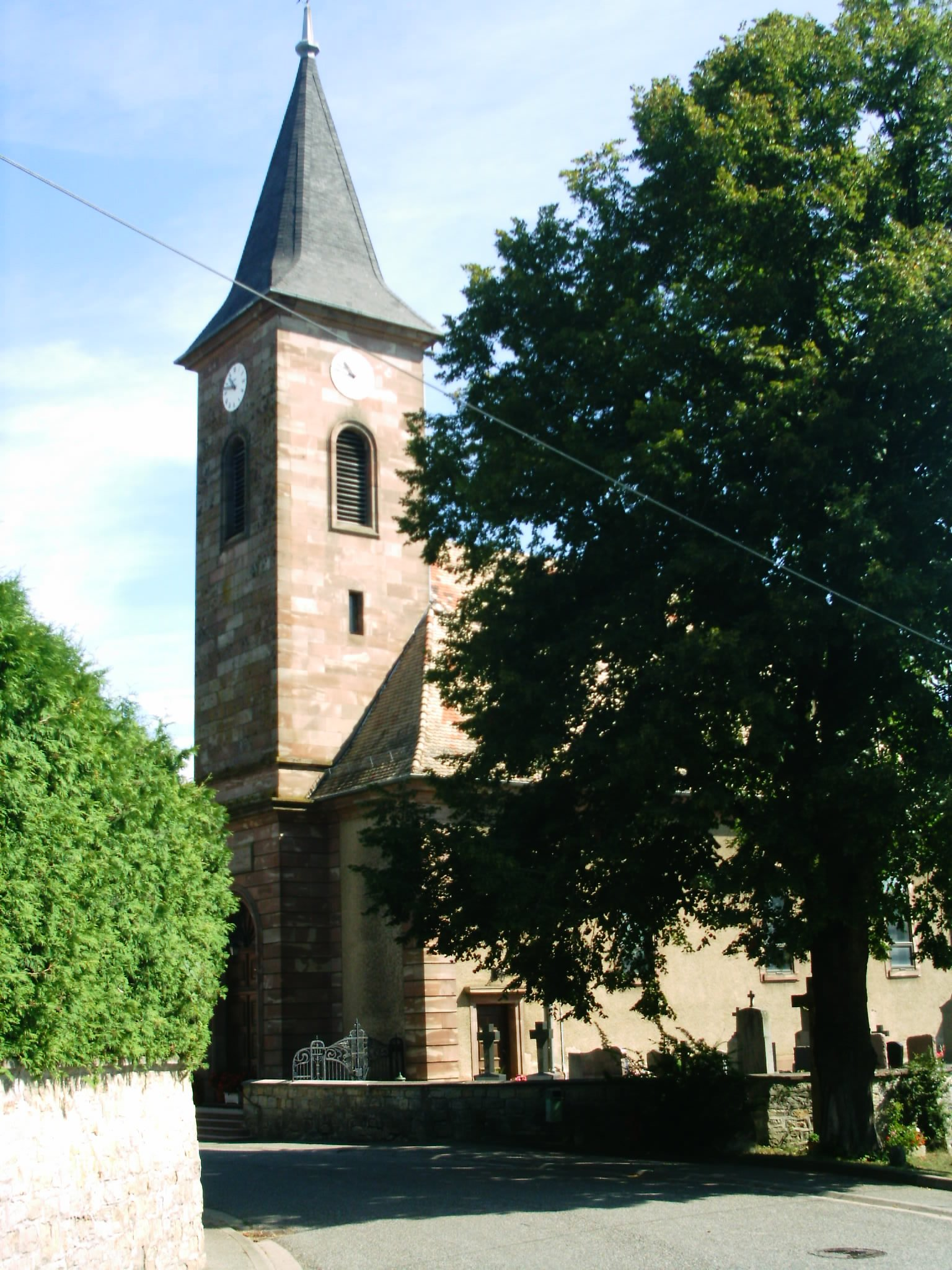
- The church in Eglingen

- Coat of arms
- Location of Eglingen
- Location within France Location within Grand Est
- Coordinates: 47°39′58″N 7°10′58″E
- Country: France
- Region: Grand Est
- Department: Haut-Rhin
- Arrondissement: Altkirch
- Canton: Masevaux-Niederbruck

Government
  - Mayor (2020–2026): Pierre Schmitt
- Area^{1}: 3.72 km^{2} (1.44 sq mi)
- Elevation: 290 m (950 ft)
- Highest elevation: 317 m (1,040 ft)
- Lowest elevation: 273 m (896 ft)
- Population (2023): 358
  - Density: 96.2/km^{2} (249/sq mi)
- Time zone: UTC+01:00 (CET)
  - Summer (DST): UTC+02:00 (CEST)
- INSEE/Postal code: 68077 /68720
- ^{1} French Land Register data, which excludes lakes, ponds, glaciers > 1 km^{2} (0.386 sq mi or 247 acres) and river estuaries.

Eglingen (French pronunciation: [eɡliŋ(ɡ)ən]) is a commune in the Haut-Rhin department in Alsace in north-eastern France.

== Population ==
Historical population
Year	Pop.	±% p.a.
1968	214	—
1975	234	+1.28%
1982	217	−1.07%
1990	231	+0.78%
1999	247	+0.75%
2007	324	+3.45%
2012	363	+2.30%
2017	365	+0.11%
2023	358	−0.32%
Source: INSEE

== See also ==
- Communes of the Haut-Rhin department
