= Ralph Yandell =

British gymnast (1892–1982)

- Full name: Ralph Harold Yandell
- Born: 29 March 1892 Bristol, England
- Died: 20 July 1982 (aged 90) St Mary's, Isles of Scilly, England

Gymnastics career
- Discipline: Men's artistic gymnastics
- Country represented: (United Kingdom) Great Britain

Ralph Harold Yandell (29 March 1892 – 20 July 1982) was a British gymnast. He competed in the men's team all-around event at the 1920 Summer Olympics.
