= Thomas Wand-Tetley =

British modern pentathlete

Personal information
- Born: 26 September 1890 Paignton, England
- Died: 4 February 1956 (aged 65) Saint Mary, Jersey

Sport
- Sport: Fencing, modern pentathlon

Thomas Harrison Wand-Tetley (26 September 1890 – 4 February 1956) was a British fencer and modern pentathlete. He competed in modern pentathlon and foil fencing at the 1920 as well as individual and team foil at the 1928 Summer Olympics.

== British Army Career ==
Having been educated at Eastbourne College and Sandhurst, Wand-Tetley was commissioned into the Wiltshire Regiment in 1910. Shortly after leaving the Royal Military Academy, he joined 1st Battalion, The Wiltshire Regiment in Pietermaritzburg, South Africa, where he served for two-and-a-half years, before returning with his battalion to Tidworth, Hampshire.

=== First World War ===
Wand-Tetley was a lieutenant when the First World War broke out, and was attending the Assistant Instructors Course at the Army School of Physical and Bayonet Training. The course was terminated and he returned to rejoin 1st Battalion, The Wiltshire Regiment in Tidworth, to resume his appointment as commander of the Regimental Scouts. In mid-August, he deployed with his battalion, as part of the British Expeditionary Force (BEF), and 1st Wiltshires deployed to Mons, Belgium. He fought with 1st Wiltshires in the First Battle of Mons, and within a few days his battalion was again in action, in the Battle of Le Cateau. In early October, he was Mentioned in Despatches for his work in the Regimental Scouts. Subsequently, 1st Wiltshires was engaged in heavy fighting at Neuve Chapelle, during the First Battle of Ypres.

On 25 October, and with battalion casualties rising, Wand-Tetley was given command of A Company, 1st Wiltshires. Two days later, during heavy fighting, he was shot in the neck and leg and captured by the Germans. He remained a prisoner of war (POW) for the remainder of the war, first in Germany and then, from February 1918, in Holland. For his time as a POW he was subsequently twice Mentioned in Despatches, first (in 1919) for 'valuable war services rendered as a prisoner of war', and then (in 1920) for 'gallant conduct and determination in attempting to escape from captivity'.

=== Inter-War Years ===
In 1919, Wand-Tetley assumed the appointment of Officer Instructor at the Army School of Physical and Bayonet Training. Within fifteen months he was appointed as Superintendent and Chief Instructor at the school, a post he held until 1923. During this time he represented Great Britain at the 1920 Olympic Games in Antwerp, in fencing and modern pentathlon. Throughout the 1920s, he also boxed for the Army at welterweight, and played hockey for the Army and his country.

In March 1923, Wand-Tetley returned to 1st Wiltshires for six months in Tidworth, before deploying overseas to South Africa. At Robert's Heights, near Pretoria, in his appointment as Instructor of Physical and Recreational Training, he was responsible for training the South African Army, Air Force and Police. A year later, he returned to 1st Wiltshires, at Tidworth, where he remained for a further year. Subsequently, in November 1925, he moved back to Aldershot as Superintendent of Physical Training, a post he held there for four years. He was promoted to major in 1927, represented Great Britain at the 1928 Olympic Games in Amsterdam, in fencing, and appointed Officer of the Most Excellent Order of the British Empire (OBE) in the King's Birthday Honours List of 1929.

Having returned to 1st Wiltshires in December 1929, Wand-Tetley deployed with them to Alexandria, Egypt, in the spring of 1930. Upon initial deployment he commanded Headquarters Company, and subsequently C Company. Upon returning with his battalion to England in March 1931, he took up a two-year appointment with Eastern Command, as its General Staff Officer for Physical Training. Thereafter, in 1933 he moved to Devizes and assumed command of the Wiltshire Regimental Depot. In June 1935, upon promotion to lieutenant colonel, he moved back to Aldershot and was appointed Commandant, Army School of Physical Training. During his time in Aldershot, he drew up plans for a new gymnasium, which still bears his name. In 1936, he went to the Berlin Olympics as a judge of fencing.

=== Second World War ===
In February 1939, upon promotion to colonel, Wand-Tetley moved to Horse Guards to assume the appointment of Inspector of Physical Training at the War Office. He oversaw the expansion of the physical training staff from its pre-war strength of 280 to some 3,000 by the end of the war. Moreover, he established three Army Physical Development Centres, whereby many thousands of sub-standard recruits, who would otherwise have been lost to the Army, were able to be enlisted. He was also responsible for converting the old Army Physical Training Staff into the Army Physical Training Corps (APTC), and is thus acknowledged as the founder of the APTC. Upon retirement from the Army as an honorary brigadier, in January 1945, Wand-Tetley was recognised for his services and appointed Commander of the Most Excellent Order of the British Empire (CBE).

== Personal life ==
In August 1918, Wand-Tetley married Cécile Florence (née Tatham) at the English Church, in The Hague. Their reception was held at the British Legation, at the invitation of Sir Walter and Lady Susan Townley. They had three sons, Peter, born in 1920, John, born in 1922, and Nigel, born in 1924. All Wand-Tetley's sons were 'high achievers', like their father. During the Second World War, Peter became a decorated special forces officer, serving sequentially in the Army Commandos, Special Air Service, Special Operations Executive, and the Parachute Regiment. John became a successful doctor. Nigel, a Royal Navy officer, spent his last day of service, in 1969, in the Roaring Forties, racing his trimaran in the Sunday Times Single-handed Non-stop Race Round the World. This was the race in which the delusional and paranoid Donald Crowhurst fooled the world that he was in contention, although he had never left the Atlantic. Wand-Tetley died on 4 February 1956, in Jersey, at the age of 65.
