= Jean Van Guysse =

Belgian gymnast (1881–1945)

- Full name: Joannes Camillus Van Guysse
- Born: 3 August 1881 Ghent, Belgium
- Died: 20 August 1945 (aged 64) Ghent, Belgium

Gymnastics career
- Discipline: Men's artistic gymnastics
- Country represented: Belgium

Joannes Camillus "Jean" Van Guysse (3 August 1881 – 20 August 1945) was a Belgian gymnast. He competed in the men's artistic individual all-around event at the 1908 Summer Olympics and won a silver medal in the team event at the 1920 Summer Olympics.
