= Julien Verdonck =

Belgian gymnast (1885–1949)

- Born: 13 January 1885
- Died: 7 March 1949 (aged 64)

Gymnastics career
- Discipline: Men's artistic gymnastics
- Country represented: Belgium

Julien Verdonck (13 January 1885 – 7 March 1949) was a Belgian gymnast. He competed in the men's team all-around event at the 1920 Summer Olympics, winning the silver medal.
