= George Masters (gymnast) =

British gymnast (1884–1962)

- Born: 4 July 1884 London, England
- Died: 1 July 1962 (aged 77) St. Albans, England

Gymnastics career
- Discipline: Men's artistic gymnastics
- Country represented: (United Kingdom) Great Britain

George Masters (4 July 1884 – 1 July 1962) was a British gymnast. He competed in the men's team all-around event at the 1920 Summer Olympics.
