= Paul Durin =

French gymnast (1890–1953)

- Full name: Paul Joseph Durin
- Born: 3 January 1890 Maubeuge, France
- Died: 24 May 1953 (aged 63) Maubeuge, France

Gymnastics career
- Discipline: Men's artistic gymnastics
- Country represented: France
- Gym: La Maubeugeoise
Medal record
Men's artistic gymnastics
Representing France
Olympic Games
Bronze medal – third place	1920 Antwerp	Team

Paul Joseph Durin (3 January 1890 – 24 May 1953) was a French gymnast who competed in the 1908 Summer Olympics and in the 1920 Summer Olympics.

In 1908, he finished fifth with the French team in the team event. Twelve years later, he was part of the French team, which won the bronze medal in the gymnastics men's team, European system event in 1920.
