= Mario Boero =

Italian water polo player (1893–1973)

Personal information
- Full name: Mario Giuseppe Giovanni Boero
- Nationality: Italian
- Born: 17 October 1893; Genoa, Kingdom of Italy
- Died: 31 December 1973 (aged 80); Genoa, Italy

Sport
- Sport: Water polo

Mario Boero (17 October 1893 – 31 December 1973) was an Italian water polo player. He competed in the men's tournament at the 1920 Summer Olympics. Also on the team was his brother Ercole Boero.
