= Emilio Badini =

Italian Argentine footballer (1897-1956)

Personal information
- Date of birth: 4 August 1897
- Place of birth: Rosario, Santa Fe, Argentina
- Date of death: 4 August 1956 (aged 59)
- Position: Midfielder

Senior career*
Years	Team	Apps	(Gls)
1913–1921	Bologna		
1921–1922	SPAL		
1922–1923	Virtus Bologna	6	(2)

International career
1920	Italy	2	(1)
- * Club domestic league appearances and goals

Emilio Badini (Spanish: [eˈmiljo βaˈðini], Italian: [eˈmiːljo baˈdiːni]; 4 August 1897 – 4 August 1956) was an Italian Argentine professional footballer who played as a midfielder.

== Biography ==
Badini was born in Rosario, Santa Fe Argentina and had Argentine citizenship but represented Italy internationally, thanks to his Bolognese parents.

== Club career ==
Badini played for 8 seasons with Bologna F.C. 1909 between 1913 and 1921. He later also represented SPAL and Virtus Bologna.

== International career ==
Badini made his debut for the Italy national football team on 31 August 1920 in a 1920 Summer Olympics game against Norway and scored a winning goal in extra time, which was his only international goal. In total he made two international appearances, both of which came that year.

== Personal life ==
Emilio Badini's older brother Angelo Badini and younger brothers Cesare Badini and Augusto Badini all played for Bologna. To distinguish them, Angelo was referred to as Badini I, Emilio as Badini II, Cesare as Badini III and Augusto as Badini IV.
