= Ferdinand Minnaert =

Belgian gymnast (1887–1975)

- Born: 27 November 1887 Ghent, Belgium
- Died: 26 August 1975 (aged 87) Ghent, Belgium

Gymnastics career
- Discipline: Men's artistic gymnastics
- Country represented: Belgium

Ferdinand Minnaert (27 November 1887 – 26 August 1975) was a Belgian gymnast. He competed in the men's team all-around event at the 1920 Summer Olympics, winning the silver medal.
