= Umberto Lungavia =

Italian water polo player

Personal information
- Nationality: Italian
- Born: 24 February 1901; Sampierdarena, Italy
- Died: 13 September 1970 (aged 69)

Sport
- Sport: Water polo

Umberto Lungavia (24 February 1901 – 13 September 1970) was an Italian water polo player. He competed in the men's tournament at the 1920 Summer Olympics.
