= Auguste Landrieu =

Belgian gymnast

- Born: 13 April 1888 Ronse, Belgium

Gymnastics career
- Discipline: Men's artistic gymnastics
- Country represented: Belgium

Auguste Landrieu (born 13 April 1888, date of death unknown) was a Belgian gymnast. He competed in the men's team all-around event at the 1920 Summer Olympics, winning the silver medal.
