= Georges Berger (gymnast) =

French gymnast

- Full name: Georges Hubert Albert Berger
- Born: 1 May 1897 Louvroil, France
- Died: 16 November 1952 (aged 55) Trith-Saint-Léger, France

Gymnastics career
- Discipline: Men's artistic gymnastics
- Country represented: France
Medal record
Men's artistic gymnastics
Representing France
Olympic Games
Bronze medal – third place	1920 Antwerp	Team

Georges Hubert Albert Berger (1 May 1897 – 16 November 1952) was a French gymnast who competed in the 1920 Summer Olympics.
