= Sidney Andrew =

British gymnast (1893–1973)

- Born: 27 October 1893
- Died: 20 September 1973 (aged 79)

Gymnastics career
- Discipline: Men's artistic gymnastics
- Country represented: (United Kingdom) Great Britain

Sidney Andrew (27 October 1893 – 20 September 1973) was a British gymnast. He competed in the men's team all-around event at the 1920 Summer Olympics.
