= Paulin Lemaire =

French gymnast

- Full name: Paulin Alexandre Lemaire
- Born: 18 December 1882 Maubeuge, France
- Died: 17 October 1932 (aged 49)

Gymnastics career
- Discipline: Men's artistic gymnastics
- Country represented: France
- Gym: La Hautmontoise
Medal record
Men's artistic gymnastics
Representing France
Olympic Games
Bronze medal – third place	1920 Antwerp	Team

Paulin Alexandre Lemaire (18 December 1882 – 17 October 1932) was a French gymnast who competed at the 1900 Summer Olympics, 1908 Summer Olympics, and the 1920 Summer Olympics. He was part of the French team, which won the bronze medal in the gymnastics men's team, European system event in 1920.
