= Arthur Cocksedge =

British artistic gymnast (1892–1973)

- Full name: Arthur George Cocksedge
- Born: 4 September 1892 Islington, England
- Died: 30 September 1973 (aged 81) Bognor Regis, England

Gymnastics career
- Discipline: Men's artistic gymnastics
- Country represented: (United Kingdom) Great Britain

Arthur George Cocksedge (4 September 1892 – 30 September 1973) was a British gymnast who competed in the 1920 Summer Olympics and a member of the 1924 Summer Olympics team, though he did not compete. As a member of the British team in 1920 he finished fifth in the team, European system competition.

He was a member of the Northampton Polytechnic Institute Gymanist Club and was the Champion of United Kingdom in 1920.
