= Ted Ness =

British gymnast (1888–1967)

- Full name: Edwin Philip Ness
- Born: 20 May 1888 Prestwich, England
- Died: 18 September 1967 (aged 79) Sutton Coldfield, England

Gymnastics career
- Discipline: Men's artistic gymnastics
- Country represented: (United Kingdom) Great Britain

Edwin Philip "Ted" Ness (20 May 1888 – 18 September 1967) was a British gymnast. He competed in the men's team all-around event at the 1920 Summer Olympics.
