= Ercole Boero =

Italian water polo player (1889–1952)

Personal information
- Nationality: Italian
- Born: 1889; Genoa, Italy
- Died: 7 June 1952 (aged 62–63); Genoa, Italy

Sport
- Sport: Water polo

Ercole Boero (1889 – 7 June 1952) was an Italian water polo player. He competed in the men's tournament at the 1920 Summer Olympics. Also on the team was his brother, Mario Boero.
