= Charles Lannie =

Belgian gymnast

- Born: 21 August 1881 Boom, Belgium
- Died: 3 June 1958 (aged 76) Berchem, Belgium

Gymnastics career
- Discipline: Men's artistic gymnastics
- Country represented: Belgium

Charles Lannie (21 August 1881 – 3 June 1958) was a Belgian gymnast. He competed in the men's team all-around event at the 1920 Summer Olympics, winning the silver medal.
