= Alfred Pinner =

British gymnast (1891–1976)

- Full name: Alfred Oscar Pinner
- Born: 14 November 1891 Ipswich, England
- Died: 1976 (aged 84–85) Ipswich, England

Gymnastics career
- Discipline: Men's artistic gymnastics
- Country represented: (United Kingdom) Great Britain

Alfred Oscar Pinner (14 November 1891 – 1976) was a British gymnast. He competed in the men's team all-around event at the 1920 Summer Olympics.
