= Luigi Maiocco =

Italian artistic gymnast

- Full name: Luigi Arturo Maiocco
- Born: 11 October 1892 Turin, Kingdom of Italy
- Died: 10 December 1965 (aged 73) Turin, Italy

Gymnastics career
- Discipline: Men's artistic gymnastics
- Country represented: Italy
- Club: Reale Società Ginnastica Torino
Medal record
Men's artistic gymnastics
Representing Kingdom of Italy
Olympic Games
Gold medal – first place	1912 Stockholm	Team
Gold medal – first place	1920 Antwerp	Team
Gold medal – first place	1924 Paris	Team

Luigi Arturo Maiocco (11 October 1892 – 10 December 1965) was an Italian gymnast who competed in the 1912, 1920 and 1924 Summer Olympics. He was born in Turin. He was part of the Italian team, which won three consecutive gold medals in the gymnastics men's team event. In 1920, he finished seventh in the Individual all-around.
