= Carlo Fregosi =

Italian artistic gymnast (1890–1968)

- Born: 15 October 1890 Savona, Kingdom of Italy
- Died: 13 November 1968 (aged 78) Vado Ligure, Italy

Gymnastics career
- Discipline: Men's artistic gymnastics
- Country represented: Italy
- Gym: Fratellanza Savonese
Medal record
Men's artistic gymnastics
Representing Kingdom of Italy
Olympic Games
Gold medal – first place	1912 Stockholm	Team
Gold medal – first place	1920 Antwerp	Team

Carlo Fregosi (15 October 1890 – 13 November 1968) was an Italian gymnast who competed in the 1912 Summer Olympics and in the 1920 Summer Olympics. He was part of the Italian team, which was able to win the gold medal in the gymnastics men's team, European system event in 1912 as well as in 1920.
