= Francesco Loi =

Italian artistic gymnast

Francesco Loy
- Full name: Francesco Emanuele Giovanni Loy
- Born: 21 February 1891 Cagliari, Kingdom of Italy
- Died: 9 March 1977 (aged 86) Modena, Italy

Gymnastics career
- Discipline: Men's artistic gymnastics
- Country represented: Italy
- Club: Reale Società Ginnastica Torino
Medal record
Men's artistic gymnastics
Representing Kingdom of Italy
Olympic Games
Gold medal – first place	1912 Stockholm	Team
Gold medal – first place	1920 Antwerp	Team

Francesco Emanuele Giovanni Loy (February 21, 1891 – March 9, 1977) was an Italian gymnast who competed in the 1912 Summer Olympics and in the 1920 Summer Olympics. He was born in Cagliari. He was part of the Italian team, which won the gold medal in the gymnastics men's team, European system event in 1912 and 1920.
