= Giovanni Mangiante =

Italian gymnast (1893–1967)

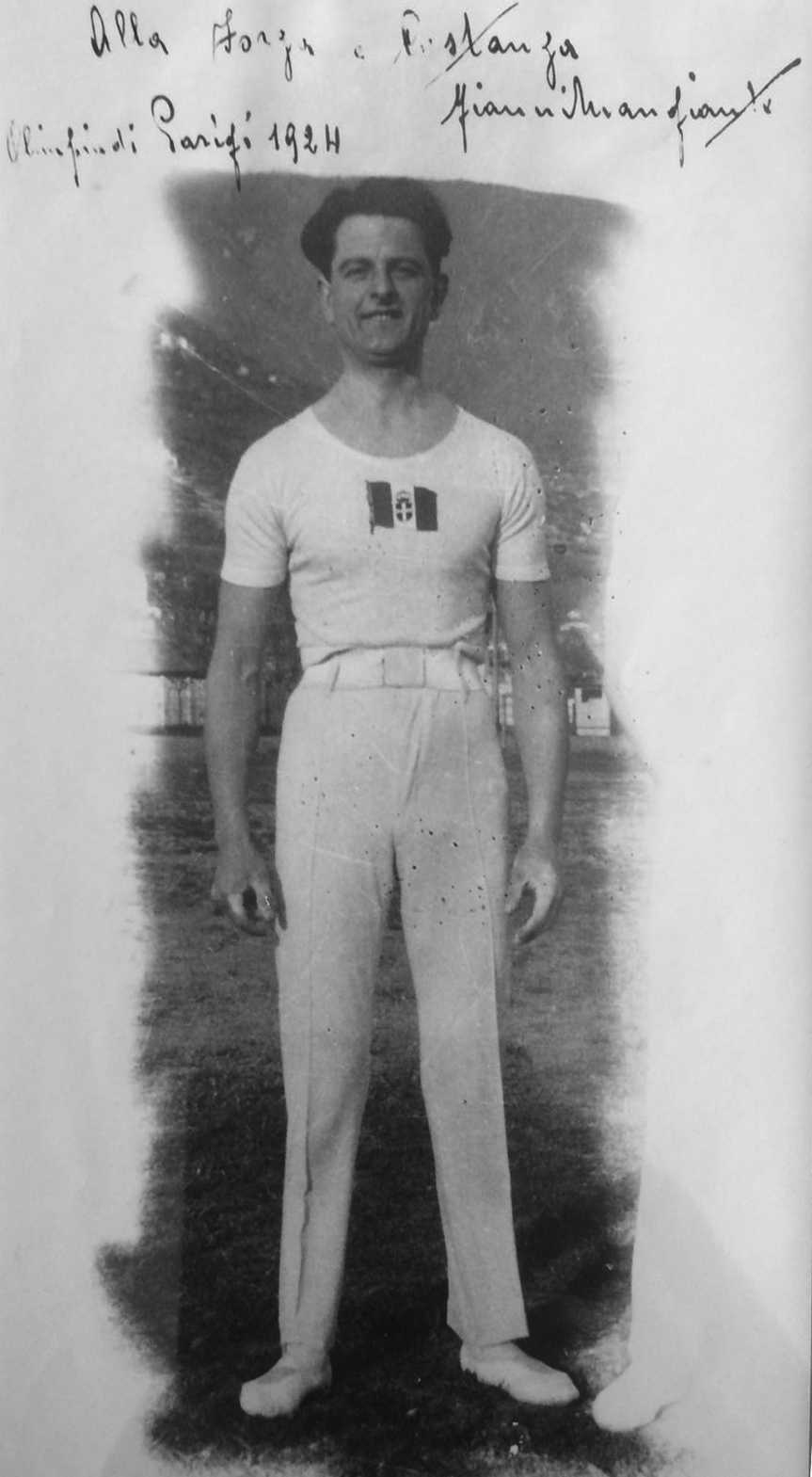
- Mangiante in 1924

Personal information
- Full name: Giovanni Agostino Generoso Mangiante
- Born: 28 August 1893 Brescia, Kingdom of Italy
- Died: 6 December 1967 (aged 74) Brescia, Italy
- Relatives: Lorenzo Mangiante (brother)

Gymnastics career
- Discipline: Men's artistic gymnastics
- Country represented: Italy
Medal record
Men's artistic gymnastics
Representing Kingdom of Italy
Olympic Games
Gold medal – first place	1912 Stockholm	Team

Giovanni Agostino Generoso Mangiante (28 August 1893 – 6 December 1967) was an Italian gymnast who competed in the 1912 Summer Olympics. He was part of the Italian team, which won the gold medal in the gymnastics men's team, European system event in 1912.
