= Angelo Zorzi =

Italian gymnast

- Born: 4 May 1890 Milan, Kingdom of Italy
- Died: 28 December 1974 (aged 84) Milan, Italy

Gymnastics career
- Discipline: Men's artistic gymnastics
- Country represented: Italy
Medal record
Men's artistic gymnastics
Representing Kingdom of Italy
Olympic Games
Gold medal – first place	1912 Stockholm	Team
Gold medal – first place	1920 Antwerp	Team

Angelo Zorzi (May 4, 1890 – December 28, 1974) was an Italian gymnast who competed in the 1912 Summer Olympics and in the 1920 Summer Olympics. He was born in Milan.

He was part of the Italian team that won the gold medal in the gymnastics men's team, European system event in 1912 and 1920. In 1920 he finished 16th in the individual all-around event.
