= Oliver Morris (gymnast) =

British gymnast

- Born: 11 June 1886 Birmingham, England
- Died: 1971 (aged 84–85) Helensburgh, Scotland

Gymnastics career
- Discipline: Men's artistic gymnastics
- Country represented: (United Kingdom) Great Britain

Oliver Morris (11 June 1886 – 1971) was a British gymnast. He competed in the men's team all-around event at the 1920 Summer Olympics.
