= Émile Boitelle =

French gymnast

- Born: 7 August 1898 Nieppe, France
- Died: 22 October 1951 (aged 53) Thiant, France

Gymnastics career
- Discipline: Men's artistic gymnastics
- Country represented: France
Medal record
Men's artistic gymnastics
Representing France
Olympic Games
Bronze medal – third place	1920 Antwerp	Team

Émile Boitelle (7 August 1888 – 22 October 1951) was a French gymnast who competed in the 1920 Summer Olympics. He was part of the French team, which won the bronze medal in the gymnastics men's team, European system event in 1920.
