= Giuseppe Domenichelli =

Italian artistic gymnast

- Full name: Giuseppe Domenico Riccardo Domenichelli
- Born: 31 July 1887 Bologna, Kingdom of Italy
- Died: 13 March 1955 (aged 67) Bologna, Italy

Gymnastics career
- Discipline: Men's artistic gymnastics
- Country represented: Italy
- Club: Società Ginnastica Fortitudo
Medal record
Men's artistic gymnastics
Representing Kingdom of Italy
Olympic Games
Gold medal – first place	1912 Stockholm	Team
Gold medal – first place	1920 Antwerp	Team

Giuseppe Domenico Riccardo Domenichelli (31 July 1887 – 13 March 1955), was an Italian gymnast who competed in the 1912 Summer Olympics and in the 1920 Summer Olympics. He was born in Bologna. He was part of the Italian team, which won the gold medal in the gymnastics men's team European system event in 1912 and 1920.
