= Lorenzo Mangiante =

Italian gymnast

- Full name: Lorenzo Giovanni Mangiante
- Born: 14 March 1891 Brescia, Kingdom of Italy
- Died: 16 June 1936 (aged 45) Curitiba, Brazil
- Relatives: Giovanni Mangiante (brother)

Gymnastics career
- Discipline: Men's artistic gymnastics
- Country represented: Italy
Medal record
Men's artistic gymnastics
Representing Kingdom of Italy
Olympic Games
| Gold medal – first place | 1912 Stockholm | Team |
| Gold medal – first place | 1920 Antwerp | Team |

Lorenzo Giovanni Mangiante (March 14, 1891 – June 16, 1936) was an Italian gymnast who competed in the 1912 Summer Olympics and in the 1920 Summer Olympics. He was part of the Italian team, which was able to win the gold medal in the gymnastics men's team, European system event in 1912 as well as in 1920.
