= France at the 1920 Summer Olympics =

- IOC code: FRA
- NOC: French Olympic Committee

in Antwerp
- Competitors: 304 (296 men and 8 women) in 23 sports
- Medals Ranked 8th: Gold 9 Silver 19 Bronze 13 Total 41

Summer Olympics appearances (overview)
- 1896; 1900; 1904; 1908; 1912; 1920; 1924; 1928; 1932; 1936; 1948; 1952; 1956; 1960; 1964; 1968; 1972; 1976; 1980; 1984; 1988; 1992; 1996; 2000; 2004; 2008; 2012; 2016; 2020; 2024

Other related appearances
- 1906 Intercalated Games

France competed at the 1920 Summer Olympics in Antwerp, Belgium. 304 competitors, 296 men and 8 women, took part in 113 events in 23 sports.

== Medalists ==
=== Gold ===
- Julien Louis Brule — Archery, Men's Individual moving bird 50m
- Joseph Guillemot — Athletics, Men's 5000m
- Paul Fritsch — Boxing, Featherweight
- Fernand Canteloube, Georges Detreille, Achille Souchard and Marcel Gobillot — Cycling, Men's Time Trial
- Armand Massard — Fencing, Men's Individual Epee
- Suzanne Lenglen and Max Decugis — Tennis, Mixed doubles
- Suzanne Lenglen — Tennis, Women's singles
- Henri Gance — Weightlifting, Middleweight
- Ernest Cadine — Weightlifting, Light heavyweight

=== Silver ===
- Julien Louis Brulé, Léonce Gaston Quentin, Pascal Fauvel, Eugène Grisot, Eugène Richez, Artur Mabellon, Léon Epin and Paul Leroy — Archery, Men's Team moving bird 33m
- Julien Louis Brulé, Léonce Gaston Quentin, Pascal Fauvel, Eugène Grisot, Eugène Richez, Artur Mabellon, Léon Epin and Paul Leroy — Archery, Men's Team moving bird 50m
- Léonce Gaston Quentin — Archery, Men's Individual moving bird 28m
- Julien Louis Brule — Archery, Men's Individual moving bird 33m
- Joseph Guillemot — Athletics, Men's 10000m
- René Tirard, René Lorain, René Mourlon and Émile Ali-Khan — Athletics, Men's 4 × 100 m relay
- Jean Gachet — Boxing, Featherweight
- Field — Equestrian, Individual vaulting
- Field, Salins, Cauchy — Equestrian, Team vaulting
- Alexandre Lippmann — Fencing, Men's Individual Epee
- Philippe Cattiau — Fencing, Men's Individual Foil
- André Labattut, Georges Trombert, Marcel Perrot, Lucien Gaudin, Philippe Cattiau, Roger François Ducret, Gaston Amson and Lionel Bony De Castellane — Fencing, Men's Team Foil
- Jean Margraff, Marc Marie Jean Perrodon, Henri Marie Raoul De Saint Germain and Georges Trombert — Fencing, Men's Team Sabre
- Marco Torrès — Gymnastics, Men's Individual all-around
- Gabriel Poix, Maurice Monney-Bouton and Ernest Barberolle — Rowing, Men's pair with coxswain (2+)
- Men's Team — Rugby
- Albert Weil, Félix Picon and Robert Monier — Sailing, 6.5 metre class (1919 rating)
- Léon Johnson, Émile Rumeau, Achille Paroche, André Parmentier and Georges Roes — Shooting, Men's Team 300m military rifle, prone
- Léon Johnson — Shooting, Men's 300m military rifle, prone

=== Bronze ===
- Julien Louis Brulé, Léonce Gaston Quentin, Pascal Fauvel, Eugène Grisot, Eugène Richez, Artur Mabellon, Léon Epin and Paul Leroy — Archery, Men's Team moving bird 28m
- Géo André, Gaston Féry, Maurice Delvart and André Devaux — Athletics, Men's 4 × 400 m relay
- Albert Eluère — Boxing, Heavyweight
- Fernand Canteloube — Cycling, Men's Individual Time Trial
- Gustave Buchard — Fencing, Men's Individual Epee
- Armand Massard, Alexandre Lippmann, Gustave Buchard, Georges Casanova, Georges Trombert, Gaston Amson and Louis Moureau — Fencing, Men's Team Epee
- Roger François Ducret — Fencing, Men's Individual Foil
- Jean Gounot — Gymnastics, Men's Individual all-around
- Men's Team — Gymnastics
- Gaston Giran and Alfred Plé — Rowing, Men's double scull (2x)
- Pierre Albarran and Max Decugis — Tennis, Men's doubles
- Elisabeth D'Ayen and Suzanne Lenglen — Tennis, Women's doubles
- Louis Bernot — Weightlifting, Heavyweight

== Archery ==
France sent eight archers in its third Olympic archery appearance, all of whom won at least three medals. The team ended up with one gold medal, four silvers, and a bronze. Because of the lack of competition, the team's worst possible result would have been five silvers and a bronze; thus, Brulé's victory over Belgium's van Innis in the individual moving bird at 50 metres to take the gold medal was the only actual success the team had.

Archer	Event	Final	
Archer	Event	Score	Rank
Julien Brulé	Moving bird, 50 m	134	1st place, gold medalist(s)
Julien Brulé	Moving bird, 33 m	94	2nd place, silver medalist(s)
Léonce Quentin	Moving bird, 28 m	104	2nd place, silver medalist(s)
Julien Brulé; Léon Epin; Pascal Fauvel; Eugène Grisot; Paul Leroy; Artur Mabellon; Léonce Quentin; Eugène Richez	Team moving bird, 50 m	2493	2nd place, silver medalist(s)
Julien Brulé; Léon Epin; Pascal Fauvel; Eugène Grisot; Paul Leroy; Artur Mabellon; Léonce Quentin; Eugène Richez	Team moving bird, 33 m	2586	2nd place, silver medalist(s)
Julien Brulé; Léon Epin; Pascal Fauvel; Eugène Grisot; Paul Leroy; Artur Mabellon; Léonce Quentin; Eugène Richez	Team moving bird, 28 m	2328	3rd place, bronze medalist(s)

== Aquatics ==
=== Diving ===
A single diver represented France in 1920. It was the nation's debut appearance in the sport. Weil came in last in his springboard semifinal group and did not advance to the final.

Men

Ranks given are within the semifinal group.

Diver	Event	Semifinals			Final		
Diver	Event	Points	Score	Rank	Points	Score	Rank
Rémy Weil	3 m springboard	31	477.30	7	Did not advance		

=== Swimming ===
Thirteen swimmers, ten men and three women, represented France in 1920. It was the nation's fourth appearance in the sport. None of the swimmers were able to advance to an event final.

Ranks given are within the heat.

Men

Swimmer	Event	Quarterfinals		Semifinals		Final	
Swimmer	Event	Result	Rank	Result	Rank	Result	Rank
Émile Arbogast	200 m breast	Unknown	5	Did not advance			
Émile Arbogast	400 m breast	Unknown	4	Did not advance			
Pierre Lavraie	1500 m free	Did not finish		Did not advance			
Lucien Lebaillif	200 m breast	Unknown	5	Did not advance			
Lucien Lebaillif	400 m breast	7:12.2	2 Q	Unknown	5	Did not advance	
Daniel Lehu	100 m back	N/A		Unknown	6	Did not advance	
Henri Matter	100 m back	N/A		Unknown	5	Did not advance	
Henri Padou	100 m free	1:08.4	3	Did not advance			
Georges Pouilley	100 m free	Unknown	4	Did not advance			
Paul Vasseur	400 m free	6:30.4	3	Did not advance			
Rémy Weil	100 m free	Unknown	4	Did not advance			
Albert Mayaud; Henri Padou; Georges Pouilley; Paul Vasseur	4 × 200 m free relay	N/A		11:53.0	4	Did not advance	

Women

Swimmer	Event	Semifinals		Final	
Swimmer	Event	Result	Rank	Result	Rank
Yvonne Degraine	100 m free	Unknown	4	Did not advance	
Ernestine Lebrun	100 m free	Unknown	4	Did not advance	
Ernestine Lebrun	300 m free	Unknown	5	Did not advance	
Suzanne Wurtz	100 m free	Unknown	5	Did not advance	
Suzanne Wurtz	300 m free	5:33.0	4	Did not advance	

=== Water polo ===
France competed in the Olympic water polo tournament for the third time in 1920. A modified version of the Bergvall System was in use at the time. France was defeated by Brazil in the opening round, not qualifying for either the silver or bronze tournaments.

Round of 16

Brazil	5–1	France	Antwerp

Final rank
11th

== Athletics ==
59 athletes represented France in 1920. It was France's sixth appearance in athletics, having competed in the sport at every Olympics. Guillemot took the nation's first Olympic gold medal in athletics by winning the 5,000 metres. He also added a silver in the 10,000 while the team took two more medals in the relay events.

Ranks given are within the heat.

Athlete	Event	Heats		Quarterfinals		Semifinals		Final	
Athlete	Event	Result	Rank	Result	Rank	Result	Rank	Result	Rank
Émile Ali-Khan	100 m	11.0	1 Q	10.9	2 Q	10.8	2 Q	11.2	5
Géo André	400 m	52.3	2 Q	51.6	3 Q	51.6	5	Did not advance	
Géo André	400 m hurdles	—N/a		55.9	2 Q		2 Q	54.8	4
Kléber Argouach	800 m	—N/a		2:02.5	4 Q	1:59.6	6	Did not advance	
André Audinet	1500 m	—N/a				4:03.7	3 Q	4:12.2	6
Fernand Bauduin	800 m	—N/a		1:59.1	3 Q	2:01	5	Did not advance	
Eugène Bayon	400 m	52.4	3	Did not advance					
Henri Bernard	110 m hurdles	—N/a			3	Did not advance			
Edmond Bimont	Cross country	—N/a							32
Edmond Brossard	3000 m steeplechase	—N/a					4	Did not advance	
Edmond Brossard	Cross country	—N/a							31
Armand Burtin	1500 m	—N/a				4:07.7	4	Did not advance	
Robert Caste	200 m	23.0	1 Q	22.2	3	Did not advance			
André Chilo	Triple jump	12.54	17	—N/a				Did not advance	
Maurice de Conninck	1500 m	—N/a				4:11.0	4	Did not advance	
Eugène Coulon	Long jump	6.50	11	—N/a				Did not advance	
Charles Courtin	Long jump	6.23	17	—N/a				Did not advance	
Maurice Delvart	400 m	51.0	3	Did not advance					
Henri Dozolme	Shot put	11.965	15	—N/a				Did not advance	
Lucien Duquesne	5000 m	—N/a				16:08.2	5	Did not advance	
Lucien Duquesne	10000 m	—N/a				35:06.6	7	Did not advance	
Émile Ecuyer	Discus throw	36.10	14	—N/a				Did not advance	
Paul Esparbès	800 m	—N/a		1:58.0	4 Q	1:57.3	3 Q	1:58.6	8
Gaston Féry	400 m	51.2	1 Q	50.6	1 Q	51.0	6	Did not advance	
André Francquenelle	Pole vault	3.60	1 Q	—N/a				3.40	10
Étienne Gajan	Pole vault	3.50	14	—N/a				Did not advance	
Robert Geyer	3000 m steeplechase	—N/a				11:11.9	4	Did not advance	
Robert Goullieux	800 m	—N/a		1:58.8	1 Q	1:59.6	5	Did not advance	
Pierre Grany	Javelin throw	47.90	14	—N/a				Did not advance	
Charles Guézille	Long jump	5.485	27	—N/a				Did not advance	
Joseph Guillemot	5000 m	—N/a				15:33.0	1 Q	14:55.6	1st place, gold medalist(s)
Joseph Guillemot	10000 m	—N/a				32:41.6	1 Q	31:47.2	2nd place, silver medalist(s)
Joseph Guillemot	Cross country	—N/a						Did not finish	
Georges Guillon	3000 m steeplechase	—N/a				10:44.3	6	Did not advance	
Pierre Guilloux	High jump	1.75	13	—N/a				Did not advance	
Gaston Heuet	10000 m	—N/a				32:11.1	3 Q	Did not finish	
Gaston Heuet	Cross country	—N/a						28:10.0	8
Louis Ichard	Marathon	—N/a						Did not finish	
Antoine Jarrety	400 m hurdles	—N/a		Did not finish		Did not advance			
René Labat	High jump	1.80	1 Q	—N/a				1.75	9
Paul Lagarde	Pole vault	3.60	1 Q	—N/a				3.40	11
Frédéric Langrenay	3000 m steeplechase	—N/a				10:39.8	5	Did not advance	
Gustave Lauvaux	Cross country	—N/a							17
René Leray	1500 m	—N/a				4:16.5	5 q	4:25.0	10
Pierre Lewden	High jump	1.80	1 Q	—N/a				1.80	7
René Lorain	100 m	11.1	3	Did not advance					
René Lorain	200 m	25.0	1 Q	23.0	3	Did not advance			
Albert Lucas	400 m hurdles	—N/a			4	Did not advance			
Jean-Baptiste Manhès	5000 m	—N/a				16:07.8	7	Did not advance	
Jean-Baptiste Manhès	10000 m	—N/a				34:12.0	4 Q	32:26.0	6
Albert Moché	Marathon	—N/a						2:50:00.2	18
René Mourlon	100 m	11.2	1 Q	11.0	3	Did not advance			
Léonce Oleffe	1500 m	—N/a				4:11.5	5	Did not advance	
Marcel Orfidan	Long jump	6.39	14	—N/a				Did not advance	
Raoul Paoli	Shot put	12.485	12	—N/a				Did not advance	
Arthur Picard	Javelin throw	47.09	15	—N/a				Did not advance	
Daniel Pierre	Discus throw	35.53	15	—N/a				Did not advance	
Etienne Proux	Triple jump	12.925	16	—N/a				Did not advance	
Gustave Remouet	Triple jump	12.475	19	—N/a				Did not advance	
Joseph Servella	Cross country	—N/a							21
Jean-René Seurin	200 m	23.6	3	Did not advance					
Martial Simon	10 km walk	—N/a				Disqualified		Did not advance	
Henri Teyssedou	Marathon	—N/a						3:00:04.0	25
René Tirard	100 m	11.7	2 Q	11.2	4	Did not advance			
René Tirard	200 m	23.2	1 Q	23.2	3	Did not advance			
André Tison	Discus throw	37.35	11	—N/a				Did not advance	
Amédée Trichard	Marathon	—N/a						Did not finish	
Edmond Brossard; Armand Burtin; Gaston Heuet	3000 m team	—N/a				7	1 Q	30	4
Gaston Heuet; Gustave Lauvaux; Joseph Servella	Team cross country	—N/a						40	5
Émile Ali-Khan; René Lorain; René Mourlon; René Tirard	4 × 100 m relay	—N/a				43.0	1 Q	42.5	2nd place, silver medalist(s)
Géo André; Maurice Delvart; André Devaux; Gaston Féry	4 × 400 m relay	—N/a				3:46.6	3 Q	3:23.5	3rd place, bronze medalist(s)

== Boxing ==
15 boxers represented France at the 1920 Games. It was the nation's second appearance in boxing. The team won three medals, including one of each type, after four of the 15 men advanced to the semifinals. The two French featherweight boxers faced off in the finals, taking gold and silver. The bronze came in the heavyweight class. France, which had not won a single bout in 1908, took fourth place on the boxing medals leader board.

Boxer	Weight class	Round of 32	Round of 16	Quarterfinals	Semifinals	Final / Bronze match	
Boxer	Weight class	Opposition Score	Opposition Score	Opposition Score	Opposition Score	Opposition Score	Rank
Charles Albert	Flyweight	N/A	Dell'Oro (ITA); W	Charpentier (BEL); W	Genaro (USA); L	Cuthbertson (GBR); L	4
Georges Cochon	Bantamweight	N/A	Vogel (USA); L	Did not advance			9
René Darbou	Light heavyweight	N/A	Sørsdal (NOR); L	Did not advance			9
Jean Dortet	Middleweight	Simonon (BEL); W	Strømme (NOR); L	Did not advance			9
Xavier Eluère	Heavyweight	N/A	Barbaresi (ITA); W	Hoel (NOR); W	Rawson (GBR); L	Spengler (USA); W	3rd place, bronze medalist(s)
Paul Fritsch	Featherweight	Bye	Etzell (USA); W	Erdal (NOR); W	Garzena (ITA); W	Gachet (FRA); L	2nd place, silver medalist(s)
Jean Gachet	Featherweight	Bye	Olsen (NOR); W	Bouvy (BEL); W	Zivic (USA); W	Fritsch (FRA); W	1st place, gold medalist(s)
Léon Gillet	Welterweight	Bye	Whitbread (GBR); W	Colberg (USA); L	Did not advance		5
Jacques Grégoire	Lightweight	N/A	Beland (RSA); L	Did not advance			9
Louis Piochelle	Light heavyweight	N/A	Bye	Franks (GBR); L	Did not advance		5
Jean-Baptiste Rampignon	Flyweight	N/A	Turner (CAN); W	Genaro (USA); L	Did not advance		5
Marcel Rey-Golliet	Middleweight	Bye	Kruse (DEN); W	Prud'Homme (CAN); L	Did not advance		5
Henri Ricard	Bantamweight	N/A	Nygaard (NOR); W	Graham (CAN); L	Did not advance		5
Henri Richards	Welterweight	Bye	Steen (NOR); L	Did not advance			9
Joseph Solvinto	Lightweight	N/A	Mosberg (USA); L	Did not advance			9

Opponent nation	Wins	Losses	Percent
Belgium	3	0	1.000
Canada	1	2	.333
Denmark	1	0	1.000
Great Britain	1	3	.250
Italy	3	0	1.000
Norway	4	3	.571
South Africa	0	1	.000
United States	3	5	.375
Total international	16	14	.533
France	1	1	.500
Total	17	15	.531

Round	Wins	Losses	Percent
Round of 32	1	0	1.000
Round of 16	8	6	.571
Quarterfinals	4	5	.444
Semifinals	2	2	.500
Final	1	1	.500
Bronze match	1	1	.500
Total	17	15	.531

== Cycling ==
Thirteen cyclists represented France in 1920. It was the nation's fifth appearance in the sport. After a disappointing result in 1912, the French road cyclists had a better Games in 1920. The four-man team took the gold medal in the team time trial, on the strength of three top-10 individual performances including Canteloube's individual bronze. The track cyclists were unable to take a medal, with highlights including Lanusse reaching the semifinals of the sprint and Alancourt taking eighth in the 50 kilometres.

=== Road cycling ===
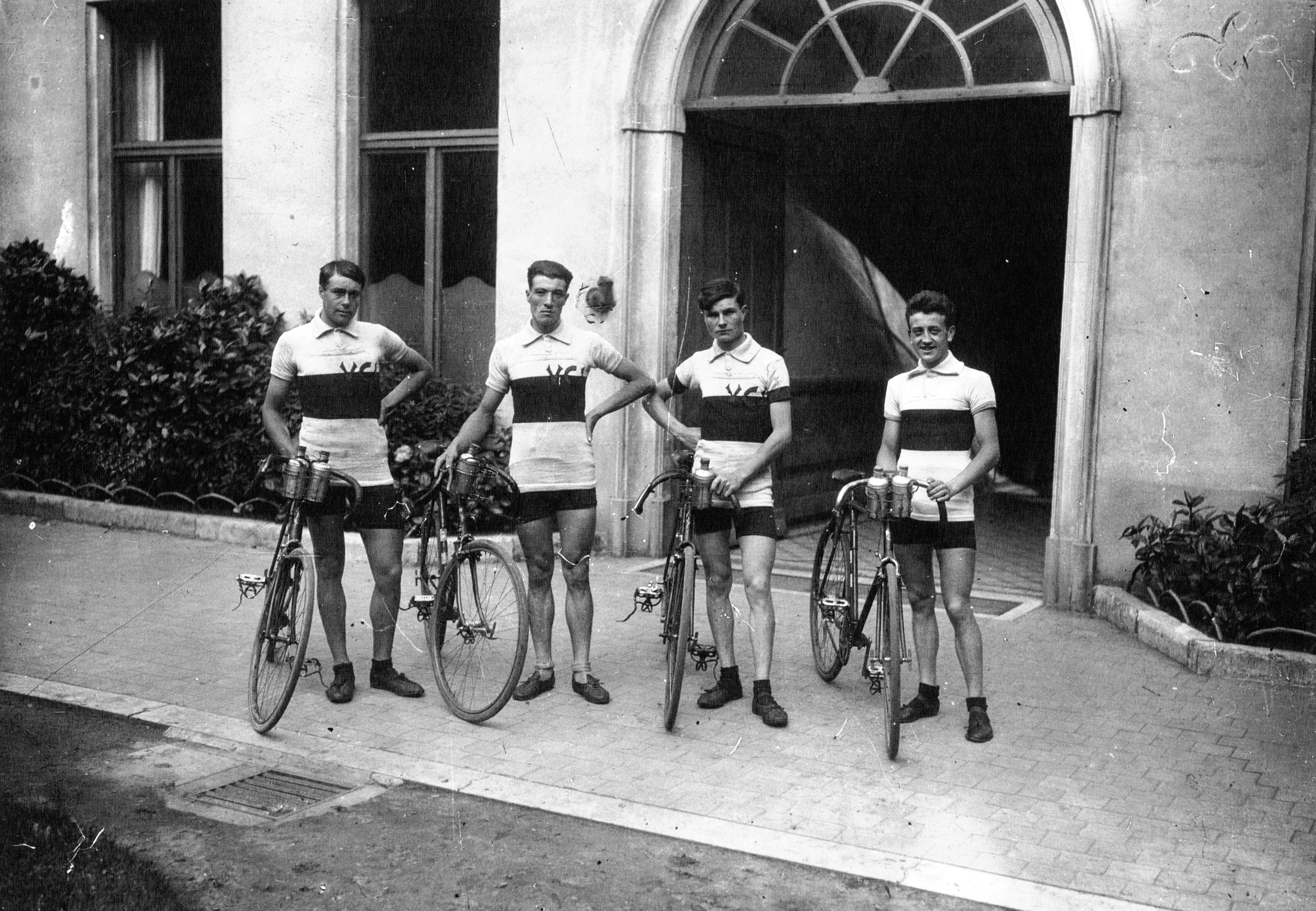
The French team won gold in the men's team time trial

Cyclist	Event	Final	
Cyclist	Event	Result	Rank
Fernand Canteloube	Time trial	4:42:54.4	3rd place, bronze medalist(s)
Georges Detreille	Time trial	4:46:13.4	6
Marcel Gobillot	Time trial	4:55:39.6	14
Achille Souchard	Time trial	4:51:56.0	10
Fernand Canteloube; Georges Detreille; Marcel Gobillot; Achille Souchard	Team time trial	19:16:43.4	1st place, gold medalist(s)

=== Track cycling ===
Ranks given are within the heat.

Cyclist	Event	Heats		Quarterfinals		Repechage semis		Repechage final		Semifinals		Final	
Cyclist	Event	Result	Rank	Result	Rank	Result	Rank	Result	Rank	Result	Rank	Result	Rank
Gaston Alancourt	50 km	N/A										Unknown	8
Henri Bellivier	Sprint	13.2	1 Q	Unknown	2 R	Unknown	1 Q	Unknown	4	Did not advance			
Courder	50 km	N/A										Did not finish	
Enguerrand	50 km	N/A										Did not finish	
Charles Lanusse	Sprint	13.0	1 Q	Unknown	2 R	13.0	1 Q	13.0	1 Q	15.2	2	Did not advance	
Georges Paillard	Sprint	Unknown	2 Q	Unknown	3 R	Unknown	3	Did not advance					
Georges Perrin	Sprint	Unknown	2 Q	Unknown	2 R	12.8	1 Q	Unknown	3	Did not advance			
Henri Bellivier; Georges Perrin	Tandem	N/A		Unknown	3	N/A				Did not advance			
Courder; Enguerrand; Lucien Faucheux; Henri Habent	Team pursuit	N/A		Unknown	2	N/A				Did not advance			

== Equestrian ==
Twenty-four equestrians represented France in 1920. It was the nation's third appearance in the sport, having been one of three countries (along with Belgium and the United States) to have appeared at each Olympic equestrian competition. For the first time, France earned no gold medals in equestrian. The best results for the country were in vaulting with a pair of silvers, one by Field in the individual and one by the team in combined score.

Equestrian	Horse	Event	Final	
Equestrian	Horse	Event	Result	Rank
Jacques Alquir-Bouffard	Dahlia	Jumping	13.25	20
Michel Artola	Plumard	Dressage	23.4375	6
Alfred Badu		Vaulting	23.000	11
Marcel Blanchard	Lenotre	Dressage	20.0000	13
Antoine Boudet	Ambleville	Dressage	21.8125	9
Hédoin de Maille	Chéri Biribi	Dressage	23.9375	5
Cabanac		Vaulting	24.333	10
Camille de Sartiges	Jehova	Eventing	1352.50	15
Cauchy		Vaulting	25.250	9
Jules de Vregille	Grand Manitou	Eventing	Did not finish	
Jean Esnault-Pelterie	Saint James	Dressage	21.8125	9
Field		Vaulting	29.500	2nd place, silver medalist(s)
Formal		Vaulting	22.833	12
Formal		Vaulting	20.500	13
Edmond L'Hotte	Kabyle	Jumping	8.00	10
Henri Mehu	Callipyge	Dressage	20.1250	12
Edouard Saint-Poulof	Josette	Eventing	1387.50	13
Salins		Vaulting	26.333	7
Franck Tisnés	Ugolin	Jumping	17.00	22
André Vidart	Maxime	Eventing	Did not finish	
Cauchy; Field; Salins		Team vaulting	81.083	2nd place, silver medalist(s)
Théophile Carbon; Auguste de Laissardière; Henri Horment; Pierre Le Moyne	Incas; Othello; Dignité; Flirt	Team jumping	34.75	4
Camille de Sartiges; Jules de Vregille; Edouard Saint-Poulof; André Vidart	Jehova; Grand Manitou; Josette; Maxime	Team eventing	Did not finish	

== Fencing ==
Eighteen fencers represented France in 1920. It was the nation's fourth appearance in the sport, and first since 1908. France, as usual, had a strong performance in the sport. The French épéeists swept the individual medals for the second time (having accomplished the feat in 1908 as well), and the foilists took a silver and a bronze. France took a medal in each of the three team events, but won no more gold medals. The team's eight total medals were the most of any nation in 1920, and the gold medal in the épée made France one of only two nations to win any golds (Italy took the other five).

Ranks given are within the group.

Fencer	Event	First round		Quarterfinals		Semifinals		Final	
Fencer	Event	Result	Rank	Result	Rank	Result	Rank	Result	Rank
Lionel Bony de Castellane	Foil	N/A		4–2	3 Q	2–3	4	Did not advance	
Gustave Buchard	Épée	6–1	1 Q	6–5	3 Q	6–5	2 Q	6–5	3rd place, bronze medalist(s)
Georges Casanova	Épée	6–2	2 Q	6–4	3 Q	9–2	1 Q	5–6	5
Philippe Cattiau	Foil	N/A		6–0	1 Q	4–1	1 Q	9–2	2nd place, silver medalist(s)
Henri de Saint-Germain	Sabre	N/A		2–4	6	Did not advance			
Frédéric Dubourdieu	Épée	7–2	1 Q	6–4	2 Q	4–7	7	Did not advance	
Roger Ducret	Épée	5–4	3 Q	5–6	7	Did not advance			
Roger Ducret	Foil	N/A		5–0	1 Q	3–2	3 Q	9–2	3rd place, bronze medalist(s)
André Labatut	Foil	N/A		6–0	1 Q	5–0	1 Q	7–4	4
Alexandre Lippmann	Épée	4–4	5 Q	7–3	2 Q	4–7	5 Q	7–4	2nd place, silver medalist(s)
Jean Margraff	Sabre	N/A		Did not finish		Did not advance			
Armand Massard	Épée	6–2	1 Q	6–4	2 Q	6–5	3 Q	9–2	1st place, gold medalist(s)
Louis Moureau	Épée	6–2	1 Q	6–4	4 Q	6–5	2 Q	5–6	6
Marc Perrodon	Sabre	N/A		3–4	5	Did not advance			
Marcel Perrot	Foil	N/A		6–2	2 Q	3–2	3 Q	3–8	11
Jean Servent	Sabre	N/A		4–4	5	Did not advance			
Georges Trombert	Épée	5–2	1 Q	8–2	1 Q	6–5	7	Did not advance	
Georges Trombert	Foil	N/A		7–1	2 Q	4–1	1 Q	3–8	10
Georges Trombert	Sabre	N/A		Did not finish		Did not advance			
Jean Margraff; Marc Perrodon; Henri de Saint-Germain; Georges Trombert	Team sabre	N/A						6–1	2nd place, silver medalist(s)
Gaston Amson; Gustave Buchard; Georges Casanova; Alexandre Lippmann; Armand Massard; Émile Moureau; Georges Trombert	Team épée	N/A				4–0	1 Q	2–2	3rd place, bronze medalist(s)
Gaston Amson; Lionel Bony; Philippe Cattiau; Roger Ducret; Lucien Gaudin; André Labattut; Marcel Perrot; Georges Trombert	Team foil	N/A				1–0	1 Q	3–1	2nd place, silver medalist(s)

== Field hockey ==
France competed in field hockey for the second time. The team took fourth place in the four-team round robin, losing to each of the other three teams.

Team	Event	Final	
Team	Event	Result	Rank
France national field hockey team	Field hockey	0–3	4

== Football ==
France competed in the Olympic football tournament for the third time. After receiving a bye into the quarterfinal, which was awarded as a 2–0 victory due to Switzerland withdrawing the morning before the first round due to internal dissent, France defeated Italy to move into the semifinals. The team was defeated there by Czechoslovakia. Under the Bergvall System in use for the tournament, France would still have gad the opportunity to play for the silver medal; however, the team left host nation Belgium after their semifinal loss and did not play in the tournament for second place.

Quarterfinals

August 29, 1920

France	3–1	Italy
Boyer 10'; Nicolas 14'; Bard 54'	Report	Brezzi 33' (pen.)

Olympisch Stadion, Antwerp
Attendance: 10,000
Referee: Henri Christophe (BEL)

Semifinals

August 31, 1920

Czechoslovakia	4–1	France
Mazal 18' 75' 87'; Steiner 70'	Report	Boyer 79'

Olympisch Stadion, Antwerp
Attendance: 12,000
Referee: Johannes Mutters (NED)

Final rank
6th

== Gymnastics ==
Twenty-nine gymnasts represented France in 1920. It was the nation's fifth appearance in the sport, matched only by Great Britain. France took three medals, a silver and two bronzes.

=== Artistic gymnastics ===
Gymnast	Event	Final	
Gymnast	Event	Result	Rank
Jean Gounot	All-around	87.45	3rd place, bronze medalist(s)
Laurent Grech	All-around	85.65	6
Louis-Charles Marty	All-around	81.15	13
Georges Thurnherr	All-around	86.00	5
Marco Torrès	All-around	87.62	2nd place, silver medalist(s)
François Walker	All-around	80.55	15
Georges Berger; Émile Bouchès; René Boulanger; Alfred Buyenne; Eugène Cordonnier; Léon Delsarte; Lucien Démanet; Paul Durin; Georges Duvant; Fernand Fauconnier; Arthur Hermann; Albert Hersoy; André Higelin; Auguste Hoël; Louis Quempe; Georges Lagouge; Paulin Lemaire; Ernest Lespinasse; Émile Boitelle; Jules Pirard; Eugène Pollet; Georges Thurnherr; Marco Torrès; François Walker; Julien Wartelle; Paul Wartelle	Team	340.100	3rd place, bronze medalist(s)

== Ice hockey ==
France competed in the inaugural Olympic ice hockey tournament. The team received a bye into the semifinals, but was defeated by Sweden there. Under the Bergvall System in place at the time, Sweden's losses in the gold medal final and the silver medal semifinals meant that France played no further; a far different fate from the other semifinal loser—the United States, who won the silver medal.

Roster

Coach: (Canada) Ernie Garon

Pos	Player	GP	G	Birthdate	Age
D	Jean Chaland	1	0	September 8, 1881	38
R	Pierre Charpentier	1	0	March 30, 1888	32
D	Henri Couttet	1	0	June 8, 1901	18
F	Georges Dary	1	0	December 6, 1889	30
F	Alfred Antoine de Rauch	1	0	June 13, 1887	32
G	Jacques Gaittet	1	0	1893	~27
F	Léon Quaglia	1	0	January 4, 1896	24
–	André Brasseur	0	–	January 8, 1887	33
–	F. Cattia	0	–		
–	Jean Puiforcat	0	–	August 5, 1897	22

Gold medal semifinals

25 April 1920; 17:00	Sweden	4 – 0 (2–0, 2–0)	France	Palais de Glace d'Anvers

Game reference

Seth Howander
Goalies
Jacques Gaittet
Referee:
(Canada) Ernie Garon

Burman	1 – 0
Svensson	2 – 0
Molander	3 – 0
Lindqvist	4 – 0

0 min
Penalties
0 min

Shots
1

Final rank
5th (Tied)

== Modern pentathlon ==
Four pentathletes represented France in 1920. It was the nation's second appearance in the sport, having competed in both instances of the Olympic pentathlon.

A point-for-place system was used, with the lowest total score winning.

Pentathlete	Final						
Pentathlete	Riding	Fencing	Shooting	Swimming	Running	Total	Rank
Georges Brulé	11	16	4	15	11	57	10
Guillaume Candelon	18	21	1	2	22	71	18
André Foucher	19	22	6	4	10	67	16
Jean Mondielli	20	18	19	12	21	72	19

== Rowing ==
Fourteen rowers represented France in 1920. It was the nation's third appearance in the sport. All three boats placed in the top four, including a silver and a bronze medal.

Ranks given are within the heat.

Rower	Cox	Event	Quarterfinals		Semifinals		Final	
Rower	Cox	Event	Result	Rank	Result	Rank	Result	Rank
Gaston Giran; Alfred Plé	N/A	Double sculls	N/A		7:26.0	1 Q	7:21.0	3rd place, bronze medalist(s)
Gabriel Poix; Maurice Monney-Bouton	Ernest Barberolle	Coxed pair	N/A		9:15.0	1 Q	7:57.0	2nd place, silver medalist(s)
Henri Barbenés; Albert Diebold; Frédéric Fleig; Robert Fleig; Frédéric Grossmann; Charles Hahn; Émile Ruhlmann; Charles Schlewer	Émile Barberolle	Eight	6:37.0	1 Q	6:42.6	1 Q	Did not advance	

== Rugby union ==
France competed in the Olympic rugby tournament for the second time. The winners of the gold medal in 1900, France was one of only two teams to compete in 1920. The French team were shut out by the United States, losing 8–0 to take the silver medal.

Final

United States	8–0	France

Attendance: 20,000

Final rank
(silver) Silver

== Sailing ==
Three sailors represented France in 1920. It was the nation's fourth appearance in the sport, making France the only nation to have competed in rowing each time the sport was held at the Olympics. France's single boat finished second of two, taking a silver medal.

Sailors	Class	Race 1		Race 2		Race 3		Total	
Sailors	Class	Result	Rank	Result	Rank	Result	Rank	Score	Rank
Robert Monier; Félix Picon; Albert Weil	6½ metre (1919)	Unknown							2nd place, silver medalist(s)

== Skating ==
=== Figure skating ===
Two figure skaters represented France in 1920. It was the nation's debut appearance in the sport. The Sabourets finished in seventh place of eight in the pairs.

Skater	Event	Final	
Skater	Event	Result	Rank
Charles Sabouret; Simone Sabouret	Pairs	45.5	7

== Shooting ==
Seventeen shooters represented France in 1920. It was the nation's fifth appearance in the sport; France was one of three nations (along with Denmark and Great Britain) to have competed at each Olympic shooting contest to that point. France took a single medal: Johnson's silver in the 300 metre military rifle prone position.

Shooter	Event	Final	
Shooter	Event	Result	Rank
Paul Colas	300 m free rifle, 3 pos.	893	Unknown
Léon Johnson	50 m small-bore rifle	Unknown	
Léon Johnson	300 m military rifle, prone	59	2nd place, silver medalist(s)
Léon Johnson	300 m military rifle, standing	Unknown	
André Parmentier	50 m small-bore rifle	Unknown	
André Parmentier	300 m free rifle, 3 pos.	905	Unknown
Achille Paroche	50 m small-bore rifle	Unknown	
Achille Paroche	300 m free rifle, 3 pos.	929	Unknown
Achille Paroche	300 m military rifle, prone	59	5
Achille Paroche	300 m military rifle, standing	Unknown	
Albert Regnier	300 m free rifle, 3 pos.	850	Unknown
Georges Roes	50 m small-bore rifle	Unknown	
Georges Roes	300 m free rifle, 3 pos.	909	Unknown
Émile Rumeau	50 m small-bore rifle	Unknown	
Émile Boitout; Léon Johnson; Jules Maujean; Joseph Pecchia; André Regaud	30 m team military pistol	1239	5
Émile Boitout; Léon Johnson; Jules Maujean; Joseph Pecchia; André Regaud	50 m team free pistol	2225	6
Paul Colas; André Parmentier; Achille Paroche; Albert Regnier; Georges Roes	Team free rifle	4487	7
Léon Johnson; André Parmentier; Achille Paroche; Georges Roes; Émile Rumeau	50 m team small-bore rifle	1847	5
Léon Johnson; André Parmentier; Achille Paroche; Georges Roes; Émile Rumeau	300 m team military rifle, prone	283	2nd place, silver medalist(s)
Léon Johnson; André Parmentier; Achille Paroche; Georges Roes; Émile Rumeau	300 m team military rifle, standing	249	5
Léon Johnson; André Parmentier; Achille Paroche; Georges Roes; Émile Rumeau	600 m team military rifle, prone	280	5
Léon Johnson; André Parmentier; Achille Paroche; Georges Roes; Émile Rumeau	300 & 600 m team military rifle, prone	563	4
Augustin Berjat; Henri de Castex; Jan de Lareinty-Tholoza; André Fleury; Marcel Lafitte; René Texier	Team clay pigeons	210	7

== Tennis ==
Ten tennis players, seven men and two women, competed for France in 1920. It was the nation's fifth appearance in the sport, tied with Great Britain for the most of any country. Lenglen won the women's singles gold, not losing a single game until her fourth match and not losing any of her ten sets. Lenglen also paired with Décugis to take the gold in the mixed pairs, and added a bronze medal in the women's pairs with D'Ayen. Décugis and Albarran won the bronze in the men's pairs, beating Blanchy and Brugnon in the bronze medal match.

Player	Event	Round of 64	Round of 32	Round of 16	Quarterfinals	Semifinals	Finals	Rank
Player	Event	Opposition Score	Opposition Score	Opposition Score	Opposition Score	Opposition Score	Opposition Score	Rank
François Blanchy	Men's singles	Dodd (RSA); L 2–6, 6–2, 6–1, 9–7	Did not advance					32
Jacques Brugnon	Men's singles	Bye	Chiesa (SUI); W 6–4, 6–5, 6–4	Raymond (RSA); L 3–6, 6–2, 6–0, 6–1	Did not advance			9
Maxime Décugis	Men's singles	Norton (RSA); W 6–4, 12–10, 2–6, 8–6	Dodd (RSA); L 6–2, 6–1, 6–1	Did not advance				17
Elisabeth D'Ayen	Women's singles	N/A	Bye	Hansen (DEN); W 6–2, 6–3	McKane (GBR); L 6–2, 6–3	Did not advance		5
Suzanne Lenglen	Women's singles	N/A	Storms (BEL); W 6–0, 6–0	McNair (GBR); W 6–0, 6–0	Strömberg (SWE); W 6–0, 6–0	Fick (SWE); W 6–0, 6–1	Holman (GBR); W 6–3, 6–0	1st place, gold medalist(s)
Jean-Pierre Samazeuilh	Men's singles	Bye	Winslow (RSA); L 7–5, 2–6, 6–3, 6–2	Did not advance				17
Jeanne Vaussard	Women's singles	N/A	McKane (GBR); L 6–4, 6–4	Did not advance				15
Pierre Albarran; Maxime Décugis	Men's doubles	N/A	Bye	de Satrústegui & Flaquer (ESP); W 6–2, 3–6, 6–0, 6–4	Blackbeard & Dodd (RSA); W 3–6, 6–4, 6–4, 6–5	Turnbull & Woosnam (GBR); L 4–6, 6–4, 6–3, 10–8	Blanchy & Brugnon (FRA); W	3rd place, bronze medalist(s)
François Blanchy; Jacques Brugnon	Men's doubles	N/A	Bye	Hykš-Černý & Just (TCH); W 6–1, 6–2, 6–4	Langaard & Nielsen (NOR); W 6–1, 6–1, 6–3	Kashio & Kumagai (JPN); L 6–4, 4–6, 6–3, 6–1	Albarran & Décugis (FRA); L	4
François Blanchy; Jeanne Vaussard	Mixed doubles	N/A	Bye	Chaudoir & Lammens (BEL); L 4–6, 7–5, 6–3	Did not advance			9
Elisabeth D'Ayen; Pierre Hirsch	Mixed doubles	N/A	Fick & Lindqvist (SWE); W 6–4, 6–2	McKane & Woosnam (GBR); L 6–4, 6–2	Did not advance			9
Elisabeth D'Ayen; Suzanne Lenglen	Women's doubles	N/A	N/A	Bye	Fick & Strömberg (SWE); W 6–4, 6–3	McKane & McNair (GBR); L 2–6, 6–3, 8–6	Arendt & Storms (BEL); W	3rd place, bronze medalist(s)
Maxime Décugis; Suzanne Lenglen	Mixed doubles	N/A	Bye	Beamish & Beamish (GBR); W 6–2, 6–0	Chaudoir & Lammens (BEL); W 3–6, 6–1, 6–1	Hansen & Tegner (DEN); W 6–0, 6–1	McKane & Woosnam (GBR); W 6–4, 6–2	1st place, gold medalist(s)
Daniel Lawton; Jean-Pierre Samazeuilh	Men's doubles	N/A	Grisar & van den Bemden (BEL); W 6–4, 6–3, 6–3	Blackbeard & Dodd (RSA); L 6–3, 6–0, 9–7	Did not advance			9

Opponent nation	Wins	Losses	Percent
Belgium	4	1	.800
Czechoslovakia	1	0	1.000
Denmark	2	0	1.000
Great Britain	4	5	.444
Japan	0	1	.000
Norway	1	0	1.000
South Africa	2	5	.286
Spain	1	0	1.000
Sweden	4	0	1.000
Switzerland	1	0	1.000
Total international	20	12	.625
France	1	1	.500
Total	21	13	.618

Round	Wins	Losses	Percent
Round of 64	1	1	.500
Round of 32	4	3	.571
Round of 16	5	4	.556
Quarterfinals	5	1	.833
Semifinals	2	3	.400
Final	2	0	1.000
Bronze match	2	1	.667
Total	20	12	.625

== Weightlifting ==
Ten weightlifters, two in each weight class, represented France in 1920. It was the nation's debut appearance in the sport. Cadine and Gance won their weight classes, making France the only country that year to take two championships. France tied Belgium for most total medals, with three.

Weightlifter	Event	Final	
Weightlifter	Event	Result	Rank
Fernand Arnout	67.5 kg	220.0	5
Louis Bernot	+82.5 kg	255.0	3rd place, bronze medalist(s)
Ernest Cadine	82.5 kg	295.0	1st place, gold medalist(s)
André Delloue	60 kg	150.0	12
Maurice Devène	82.5 kg	250.0	5
Joseph Duchateau	+82.5 kg	247.5	6
Jean Ducher	60 kg	140.0	13
Henri Gance	75 kg	245.0	1st place, gold medalist(s)
Camille Ledran	75 kg	220.0	5
Jean Vaquette	67.5 kg	215.0	7

== Wrestling ==
Seventeen wrestlers competed for France in 1920. It was the nation's second appearance in the sport. The French wrestlers were not very successful, winning only two matches out of the twenty-four they contested.

=== Freestyle ===
Wrestler	Event	Round of 32	Round of 16	Quarterfinals	Semifinals	Finals / Bronze match	Rank
Pierre Angelot	Middleweight	Bye	Janssens (BEL) (L)	Did not advance			9
Charles Backsman	Middleweight	Penttala (FIN) (L)	Did not advance				17
Georges Barathon	Featherweight	N/A	Bye	Gerson (USA) (L)	Did not advance		5
Jules Deligny	Lightweight	N/A	Anttila (FRA) (L)	Did not advance			8
Jean Harrasse	Featherweight	N/A	Bye	Bernard (GBR) (L)	Did not advance		5
Henri Joudiou	Lightweight	N/A	Bye	Wright (GBR) (L)	Did not advance		5
Pierre Ledron	Light heavyweight	N/A	Maurer (USA) (L)	Did not advance			9
François Meyer	Light heavyweight	N/A	Larsson (SWE) (L)	Did not advance			9

Opponent nation	Wins	Losses	Percent
Belgium	0	1	.000
Finland	0	2	.000
Great Britain	0	2	.000
Sweden	0	1	.000
United States	0	2	.000
Total	0	8	.000

Round	Wins	Losses	Percent
Round of 32	0	1	.000
Round of 16	0	4	.000
Quarterfinals	0	3	.000
Semifinals	0	0	–
Final	0	0	–
Bronze match	0	0	–
Total	0	8	.000

=== Greco-Roman ===
Wrestler	Event	Round of 32	Round of 16	Quarterfinals	Semifinals	Finals	Rank
Wrestler	Event	Round of 32	Round of 16	Silver quarters	Silver semis	Silver match	Rank
Wrestler	Event	Round of 32	Round of 16	Bronze quarters	Bronze semis	Bronze match	Rank
Théodore Bainconneau	Lightweight	Coerse (NED) (L)	Did not advance	Did not advance			18
Théodore Bainconneau	Lightweight	Coerse (NED) (L)	Did not advance	Did not advance			18
Théodore Bainconneau	Lightweight	Coerse (NED) (L)	Did not advance	Did not advance			18
Jules Bouquet	Featherweight	Bye	Beránek (TCH) (L)	Did not advance			11
Jules Bouquet	Featherweight	Bye	Beránek (TCH) (L)	N/A	Did not advance		11
Jules Bouquet	Featherweight	Bye	Beránek (TCH) (L)	Did not advance			11
Némo Bovis	Featherweight	Bye	Torgensen (DEN) (L)	Did not advance			11
Némo Bovis	Featherweight	Bye	Torgensen (DEN) (L)	N/A	Did not advance		11
Némo Bovis	Featherweight	Bye	Torgensen (DEN) (L)	Did not advance			11
Edmond Dame	Heavyweight	Bye	Kukk (EST) (W)	Lindfors (FIN) (L)	Did not advance		7
Edmond Dame	Heavyweight	Bye	Kukk (EST) (W)	Hansen (DEN) (L)	Did not advance		7
Edmond Dame	Heavyweight	Bye	Kukk (EST) (W)	Bye	Weyand (USA) (L)	Did not advance	7
Jean Duvinet	Light heavyweight	Ohlsson (SWE) (L)	Did not advance	Did not advance			17
Jean Duvinet	Light heavyweight	Ohlsson (SWE) (L)	Did not advance	N/A	Did not advance		17
Jean Duvinet	Light heavyweight	Ohlsson (SWE) (L)	Did not advance	N/A			17
André Gasiglia	Heavyweight	Lindfors (FIN) (L)	Did not advance	Did not advance			7
André Gasiglia	Heavyweight	Lindfors (FIN) (L)	Did not advance	Bye	Hansen (DEN) (L)	Did not advance	7
André Gasiglia	Heavyweight	Lindfors (FIN) (L)	Did not advance	Willkie (USA) (L)	Did not advance		7
Emile Gorbière	Middleweight	Corsanego (ITA) (L)	Did not advance	Did not advance			19
Emile Gorbière	Middleweight	Corsanego (ITA) (L)	Did not advance	Did not advance			19
Emile Gorbière	Middleweight	Corsanego (ITA) (L)	Did not advance	Did not advance			19
Camille Prunier	Middleweight	Huml (TCH) (L)	Did not advance	Did not advance			19
Camille Prunier	Middleweight	Huml (TCH) (L)	Did not advance	Did not advance			19
Camille Prunier	Middleweight	Huml (TCH) (L)	Did not advance	Did not advance			19
Maurice Rohon	Lightweight	Rahmy (EGY) (W)	Väre (FIN) (L)	Did not advance			8
Maurice Rohon	Lightweight	Rahmy (EGY) (W)	Väre (FIN) (L)	Bye	Frisenfeldt (DEN) (L)	Did not advance	8
Maurice Rohon	Lightweight	Rahmy (EGY) (W)	Väre (FIN) (L)	Did not advance			8

Opponent nation	Wins	Losses	Percent
Czechoslovakia	0	2	.000
Denmark	0	4	.000
Egypt	1	0	1.000
Estonia	1	0	1.000
Finland	0	3	.000
Italy	0	1	.000
Netherlands	0	1	.000
Sweden	0	1	.000
United States	0	2	.000
Total	2	14	.125

Round	Wins	Losses	Percent
Round of 32	1	5	.167
Round of 16	1	3	.250
Quarterfinals	0	1	.000
Semifinals	0	0	–
Final	0	0	–
Silver quarterfinals	0	1	.000
Silver semifinals	0	2	.000
Silver match	0	0	–
Bronze quarterfinals	0	1	.000
Bronze semifinals	0	1	.000
Bronze match	0	0	–
Total	2	14	.125
