= Modern pentathlon at the 1920 Summer Olympics =

Men's modern pentathlon at the Games of the VII Olympiad
- Venue: Olympisch Stadion
- Dates: August 24–27, 1920
- Competitors: 23 from 8 nations

Medalists
1st place, gold medalist(s)		Gustaf Dyrssen	Sweden
2nd place, silver medalist(s)		Erik de Laval	Sweden
3rd place, bronze medalist(s)		Gösta Runö	Sweden

At the 1920 Summer Olympics in Antwerp, a single modern pentathlon event was contested. As in 1912, Swedish athletes won all three medals.

== Participating nations ==
A total of 23 athletes from 8 nations competed at the Antwerp Games:

- Denmark (4)
- Finland (2)
- France (4)
- Great Britain (4)
- Italy (1)
- Norway (2)
- Sweden (4)
- United States (2)

== Results ==
Rank	Athlete	Riding	Fencing	Shooting	Swimming	Running	Score
1	Gustaf Dyrssen (SWE)	6	2	2	6	2	18
2	Erik de Laval (SWE)	1	13	5	1	3	23
3	Gösta Runö (SWE)	4	1	16	5	1	27
4	Bengt Uggla (SWE)	13	5	10	13	5	46
5	Marius Christensen (DEN)	12	7	3	7	18	47
6	Harold Rayner (USA)	5	12	13	14	4	48
7	Emil Alfons Hagelberg (FIN)	10	3	21	9	8	51
8	Robert Sears (USA)	3	8	9	11	20	51
9	Ejner Augsburg (DEN)	14	4	14	8	17	57
10	Georges Brulé (FRA)	11	16	4	15	11	57
11	Edward Clarke (GBR)	17	14	15	10	12	60
12	Harry Bjørnholm (DEN)	8	20	18	3	15	61
13	Arne Tellefsen (NOR)	2	10	20	19	13	62
14	Olliver Smith (NOR)	8	9	17	22	6	65
15	John Boustead (GBR)	15	11	12	16	7	66
16	André Foucher (FRA)	19	22	6	4	10	67
17	Thomas Wand-Tetley (GBR)	22	15	8	17	9	69
18	Guillaume Candelon (FRA)	18	21	1	2	22	71
19	Jean Mondielli (FRA)	20	18	19	12	21	72
20	Johan Skjoldager (DEN)	7	17	22	20	14	77
21	Edward Gedge (GBR)	16	6	11	18	16	78
22	Adriano Lanza (ITA)	21	19	11	21	19	91
—	Kalle Kainuvaara (FIN)						DNF
