= Weightlifting at the 1920 Summer Olympics =

Weightlifting at the Games of the VII Olympiad
- Weightlifting pictogram
- Venue: Olympisch Stadion
- Date: 29 August 1920
- No. of events: 5 (5 men, 0 women)
- Competitors: 53 from 14 nations

Weightlifting returned to the Olympic program at the 1920 Summer Olympics in Antwerp, with competition in five weight classes, for men only. The sport had previously been contested at the Olympic Games in 1904.

== Medal summary ==
Games	Gold	Silver	Bronze
Featherweight –60 kg	Frans De Haes; Belgium	Alfred Schmidt; Estonia	Eugène Ryter; Switzerland
Lightweight –67.5 kg	Alfred Neuland; Estonia	Louis Williquet; Belgium	Florimond Rooms; Belgium
Middleweight –75 kg	Henri Gance; France	Pietro Bianchi; Italy	Albert Pettersson; Sweden
Light-heavyweight –82.5 kg	Ernest Cadine; France	Fritz Hünenberger; Switzerland	Erik Pettersson; Sweden
Heavyweight +82.5 kg	Filippo Bottino; Italy	Joseph Alzin; Luxembourg	Louis Bernot; France

== Participating nations ==
A total of 53 weightlifters from 14 nations competed at the Antwerp Games:

- Belgium (7)
- Czechoslovakia (2)
- Denmark (5)
- Egypt (1)
- Estonia (3)
- Finland (1)
- France (10)
- Great Britain (2)
- Greece (1)
- Italy (5)
- Luxembourg (3)
- Netherlands (5)
- Sweden (6)
- Switzerland (2)

== Medal table ==
Rank	Nation	Gold	Silver	Bronze	Total
1	France	2	0	1	3
2	Belgium	1	1	1	3
3	Estonia	1	1	0	2
3	Italy	1	1	0	2
5	Switzerland	0	1	1	2
6	Luxembourg	0	1	0	1
7	Sweden	0	0	2	2
Totals (7 entries)		5	5	5	15
