= Equestrian at the 1920 Summer Olympics – Team jumping =

Team jumping at the Games of the VII Olympiad
- Venue: Olympisch Stadion
- Date: 12 September
- Competitors: 20 from 5 nations

Medalists
1st place, gold medalist(s)		Claës König, Frank Martin, Daniel Norling, Hans von Rosen; Sweden
2nd place, silver medalist(s)		André Coumans, Herman de Gaiffier d'Hestroy, Herman d'Oultromont, Henri Laame; Belgium
3rd place, bronze medalist(s)		Alessandro Alvisi, Carlo Asinari, Giulio Cacciandra, Ettore Caffaratti; Italy

The team jumping event was part of the equestrian programme at the 1920 Summer Olympics.

== Results ==
The riders who competed in the individual jumping event were not allowed to participate also on the team.

Place	Team	Ind. place	Score	Total
Final
Gold	Sweden			14.00
Gold	Claës König and Tresor	2	2.00	14.00
Gold	Hans von Rosen and Poor Boy	5	6.00	14.00
Gold	Daniel Norling and Eros II	5	6.00	14.00
Gold	Frank Martin and Kohort	11	10.00	14.00
Silver	Belgium			16.25
Silver	Henri Laame and Biscuit	3	2.75	16.25
Silver	André Coumans and Lisette	4	5.25	16.25
Silver	Herman de Gaiffier d'Hestroy and Miss	9	8.25	16.25
Silver	Herman d'Oultromont and Lord Kitchener	18	30.00	16.25
Bronze	Italy			18.75
Bronze	Ettore Caffaratti and Tradittore	1	1.50	18.75
Bronze	Alessandro Alvisi and Raggio di Sole	7	6.25	18.75
Bronze	Giulio Cacciandra and Fortunello	12	11.00	18.75
Bronze	Carlo Asinari and Varone	19	33.00	18.75
4	France			34.75
4	Auguste de Laissardière and Othello	8	7.50	34.75
4	Henri Horment and Dignité	14	13.25	34.75
4	Théophile Carbon and Incas	15	14.00	34.75
4	Pierre Lemoyne and Flirt	15	14.00	34.75
5	United States			42.00
5	Harry Chamberlin and Nigra	10	9.00	42.00
5	Joe Greenwald and Moses	13	12.00	42.00
5	Vincent Erwin and Joffre	17	21.00	42.00
5	Sloan Doak and Rabbit Red	–	DNF	42.00

== Sources ==
- Belgium Olympic Committee (1957). Olympic Games Antwerp 1920: Official Report (in French).
- Wudarski, Pawel (1999). "Wyniki Igrzysk Olimpijskich" (in Polish). Archived from the original on 16 February 2009.
