= Herman d'Oultromont =

Belgian equestrian (1882–1943)

Herman Marie Ghislaine d'Oultromont (2 April 1882 in Brussels – 17 February 1943 in Woluwe-Saint-Lambert) was a Belgian equestrian who took part in the 1920 Olympic Games in Antwerp.

Oultromont won an Olympic silver medal at the 1920 Summer Olympics in Antwerp. He was part of the Belgian team who came in second place in the team competition in show jumping. The Belgian team consisted of André Coumans on the horse "Lisette", Henri Laame on "Biscuit", Herman de Gaiffier d'Hestroy on "Miss" and d'Oultromont on the horse "Lord Kitchener".

He died on 17 February 1943, at age 60.

== Olympic medals ==
- 1920 Antwerp - Silver in equestrian, show jumping, team (Belgium)
