= Mattiello =

Mattiello is an Italian surname. Notable people with the surname include:

- Federico Mattiello (born 1995), Italian footballer
- Gino Mattiello, Italian weightlifter
- Nicholas Mattiello (born 1963), American politician
