= Weightlifting at the 1920 Summer Olympics – Men's +82.5 kg =

Men's heavyweight weightlifting at the Games of the VII Olympiad
- Venue: Olympisch Stadion
- Date: 31 August
- Competitors: 6 from 5 nations

Medalists
1st place, gold medalist(s)		Filippo Bottino	Italy
2nd place, silver medalist(s)		Joseph Alzin	Luxembourg
3rd place, bronze medalist(s)		Louis Bernot	France

The men's heavyweight was a weightlifting event held as part of the Weightlifting at the 1920 Summer Olympics programme in Antwerp. 1920 was the first time weightlifting was divided into weight categories. Heavyweight was the heaviest category, including weightlifters weighing over 82.5 kilograms. A total of six weightlifters from five nations competed in the event, which was held on 31 August 1920.

== Results ==
Place	Weightlifter	1	2	3	Total
Gold	Filippo Bottino (ITA)	70.0	75.0	120.0	265.0
Silver	Joseph Alzin (LUX)	65.0	75.0	120.0	260.0
Bronze	Louis Bernot (FRA)	65.0	75.0	115.0	255.0
4	Ejnar Jensen (DEN)	60.0	75.0	115.0	250.0
5	Rikard Brunn (SWE)	60.0	80.0	110.0	250.0
6	Joseph Duchâteau (FRA)	65.0	72.5	110.0	247.5

== Sources ==
- Belgium Olympic Committee (1957). Olympic Games Antwerp 1920: Official Report (in French).
- Wudarski, Pawel (1999). "Wyniki Igrzysk Olimpijskich" (in Polish).
