= Candelon =

Candelon is a French surname. Notable people with the surname include:

- Henri Candelon, French modern pentathlete
- Julien Candelon (born 1980), French rugby union footballer
