= Jaroslav Dvořák =

Jaroslav Dvořák may refer to:

- Jaroslav Dvořák (weightlifter) (1896-?), Czech weightlifter
- Jaroslav Dvořák (politician) (born 1957), Czech neurologist and politician
