= Emil Andreasen =

Danish boxer

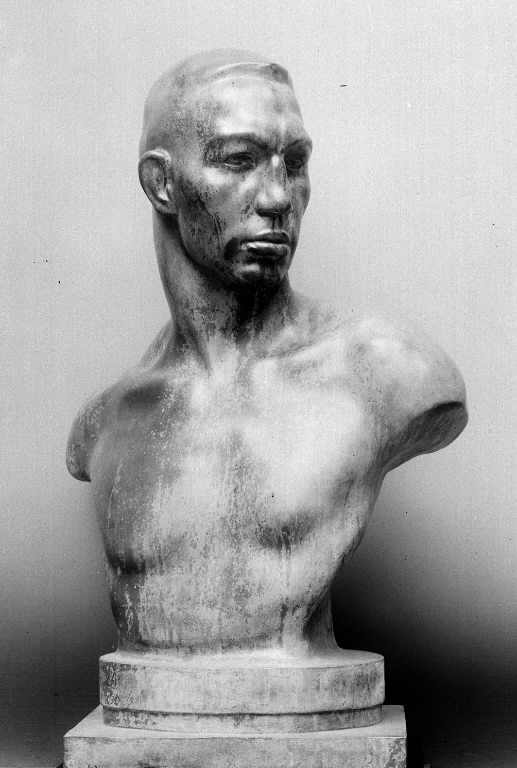
Bust of Andreasenby Kai Nielsen, 1922

Alfred Viggo Emil Andreasen (later Fjordvald; 4 September 1895 – 26 May 1972) was a Danish boxer who competed in the 1920 Summer Olympics. He was born and died in Copenhagen. In 1920 he was eliminated in the quarter-finals of the light heavyweight class after losing his fight to Hugh Brown.
