= Weightlifting at the 1920 Summer Olympics – Men's 67.5 kg =

Men's lightweight weightlifting at the Games of the VII Olympiad
- Venue: Olympisch Stadion
- Date: 29 August
- Competitors: 12 from 10 nations

Medalists
1st place, gold medalist(s)		Alfred Neuland	Estonia
2nd place, silver medalist(s)		Louis Williquet	Belgium
3rd place, bronze medalist(s)		Florimond Rooms	Belgium

The men's lightweight was a weightlifting event held as part of the Weightlifting at the 1920 Summer Olympics programme in Antwerp. 1920 was the first time weightlifting was divided into weight categories. Lightweight was the second lightest category, including weightlifters weighing up to 67.5 kilograms. A total of 12 weightlifters from 10 nations competed in the event, which was held on 29 August 1920.

== Results ==
Place	Weightlifter	1	2	3	Total
Gold	Alfred Neuland (EST)	72.5	75.0	110.0	257.5
Silver	Louis Williquet (BEL)	60.0	75.0	105.0	240.0
Bronze	Georges Rooms (BEL)	55.0	70.0	105.0	230.0
4	Giulio Monti (ITA)	55.0	70.0	105.0	230.0
5	Fernand Arnout (FRA)	60.0	60.0	100.0	220.0
5	Martin Olofsson (SWE)	55.0	70.0	95.0	220.0
7	Jean Vaquette (FRA)	55.0	65.0	95.0	215.0
8	Johny Grün (LUX)	52.5	67.5	90.0	210.0
8	Wilhelmus van Nimwegen (NED)	55.0	65.0	90.0	210.0
10	Evangelos Menexis (GRE)	50.0	60.0	95.0	205.0
11	Thorvald Hansen (DEN)	52.5	55.0	95.0	202.5
12	Percy Mills (GBR)	50.0	57.5	85.0	192.5

== Sources ==
- Belgium Olympic Committee (1957). Olympic Games Antwerp 1920: Official Report (in French).
- Wudarski, Pawel (1999). "Wyniki Igrzysk Olimpijskich" (in Polish).
