= Weightlifting at the 1920 Summer Olympics – Men's 75 kg =

Men's middleweight weightlifting at the Games of the VII Olympiad
- Venue: Olympisch Stadion
- Date: 30 August
- Competitors: 10 from 7 nations

Medalists
| 1st place, gold medalist(s) | | Henri Gance | France |
| 2nd place, silver medalist(s) | | Pietro Bianchi | Italy |
| 3rd place, bronze medalist(s) | | Albert Pettersson | Sweden |

The men's middleweight was a weightlifting event held as part of the Weightlifting at the 1920 Summer Olympics programme in Antwerp. 1920 was the first time weightlifting was divided into weight categories. Middleweight was the median category, including weightlifters weighing up to 75 kilograms. A total of ten weightlifters from seven nations competed in the event, which was held on 30 August 1920.

== Results ==
| Place | Weightlifter | 1 | 2 | 3 | Total, kilograms |
|---|---|---|---|---|---|
| Gold | Henri Gance (FRA) | 65.0 | 75.0 | 105.0 | 245.0 |
| Silver | Pietro Bianchi (ITA) | 60.0 | 70.0 | 105.0 | 235.0 |
| Bronze | Albert Pettersson (SWE) | 55.0 | 75.0 | 105.0 | 235.0 |
| 4 | Marinus Ringelberg (NED) | 55.0 | 65.0 | 105.0 | 225.0 |
| 5 | Camille Ledran (FRA) | 55.0 | 65.0 | 100.0 | 220.0 |
| 6 | Christian Jensen (DEN) | 55.0 | 60.0 | 100.0 | 215.0 |
| 7 | Marcel Marchand (BEL) | 55.0 | 55.0 | 95.0 | 205.0 |
| 8 | Pieter Belmer (NED) | 0.0 | 65.0 | 100.0 | 165.0 |
| — | Georges De Proft (BEL) | 55.0 | 65.0 | — | DNF |
| — | Hamad Samy (EGY) | 55.0 | — | — | DNF |

== Sources ==
- Belgium Olympic Committee (1957). Olympic Games Antwerp 1920: Official Report (in French).
- Wudarski, Pawel (1999). "Wyniki Igrzysk Olimpijskich" (in Polish).
