= John Downer (disambiguation) =

John Downer (1843–1915) was an Australian politician.

John Downer may also refer to:

- John Downer (equestrian) (1881–1977), American equestrian
- John Downer (filmmaker) (born 1952), British film director and producer
- John Downer (sign painter) (born 1951), American designer

== See also ==
- John Downes (disambiguation)
- John Langdon Down (1828–1896), British physician
