= Tellefsen =

Tellefsen is a Norwegian surname.

- Arne Tellefsen (1891–1973), Norwegian Olympic athlete
- Arve Tellefsen (1936-), Norwegian violinist
- Carl Tellefsen (1854-1908), Norwegian-American skiing champion
- Christopher Tellefsen (born 1957), American film editor
- Rut Tellefsen (born 1930), Norwegian actress
- Thomas Tellefsen (1823–1874), Norwegian composer and pianist
- Tom Tellefsen (1931–2012), Norwegian actor

Soul-Ryder Tellefsen (2008-
