= Joseph Greenwald =

Joseph Greenwald may refer to:

- Joseph Greenwald (actor), American actor
- Joseph A. Greenwald, American diplomat

== See also ==
- Joe Greenwald, American equestrian
- Yosef Greenwald, rabbi
