= Jim MacGregor =

South African boxer (1887–1950)

James McGregor (1887 – 20 April 1950) was a South African boxer who competed in the 1920 Summer Olympics. McGregor was born in Ladybrand. In 1920, he was eliminated in the first round of the light heavyweight class after losing his fight to Edwin Schell of the United States.

McGregor died, aged 62, in Benoni, Gauteng.
