= André Foucher =

André Foucher can refer to:

- André Foucher (cyclist) (1933–2025), French road bicycle racer
- André Foucher (pentathlete)
