= Thorvald Hansen =

Thorvald Hansen can refer to:

- Thorvald Hansen (skier), Norwegian Nordic combined skier
- Thorvald Hansen (composer) (1847–1915), Danish trumpeter and composer
- Thorvald Hansen (weightlifter) (1891–1961), Danish weightlifter
