= Weightlifting at the 1920 Summer Olympics – Men's 82.5 kg =

Men's light heavyweight weightlifting at the Games of the VII Olympiad
- Venue: Olympisch Stadion
- Date: 31 August
- Competitors: 11 from 9 nations

Medalists
1st place, gold medalist(s)		Ernest Cadine	France
2nd place, silver medalist(s)		Fritz Hünenberger	Switzerland
3rd place, bronze medalist(s)		Erik Pettersson	Sweden

The men's light heavyweight was a weightlifting event held as part of the Weightlifting at the 1920 Summer Olympics programme in Antwerp. 1920 was the first time weightlifting was divided into weight categories. Light heavyweight was the second heaviest category, including weightlifters weighing up to 82.5 kilograms. A total of eleven weightlifters from nine nations competed in the event, which was held on 31 August 1920.

== Results ==
Place	Weightlifter	1	2	3	Total
Gold	Ernest Cadine (FRA)	70.0	90.0	135.0	295.0
Silver	Fridriech Hünenberger (SUI)	75.0	90.0	112.5	275.0
Bronze	Erik Pettersson (SWE)	62.5	92.5	112.5	267.5
4	Erik Carlsson (SWE)	67.5	75.0	120.0	262.5
5	Maurice Davène (FRA)	65.0	70.0	115.0	250.0
6	Gino Mattiello (ITA)	60.0	70.0	105.0	235.0
7	Jan Welter (NED)	65.0	70.0	95.0	230.0
8	Jaroslav Dvořák (TCH)	55.0	65.0	107.5	227.5
8	Lionel Van De Roye (BEL)	57.5	65.0	105.0	227.5
10	Søren Petersen (DEN)	55.0	57.5	105.0	217.5
—	Rudolf Ekström (FIN)	70.0	—	—	DNF

== Sources ==
- Belgium Olympic Committee (1957). Olympic Games Antwerp 1920: Official Report (in French).
- Wudarski, Pawel (1999). "Wyniki Igrzysk Olimpijskich" (in Polish).
