= Christian Jensen (weightlifter) =

Danish weightlifter

Personal information
- Nationality: Danish
- Born: 4 October 1888 Aalborg, Denmark
- Died: 16 January 1947 (aged 58) Aalborg, Denmark

Sport
- Sport: Weightlifting

Christian Lassen Jensen (4 October 1888 – 16 January 1947) was a Danish weightlifter. He competed in the men's middleweight event at the 1920 Summer Olympics.
