= Wilhelmus van Nimwegen =

Dutch weightlifter

Personal information
- Nationality: Dutch
- Born: 27 June 1890; Amsterdam, Netherlands
- Died: 31 October 1958 (aged 68); Amsterdam, Netherlands

Sport
- Sport: Weightlifting

Wilhelmus van Nimwegen (27 June 1890 – 31 October 1958) was a Dutch weightlifter. He competed in the men's lightweight event at the 1920 Summer Olympics.
