= Gaspard Lemaire =

Belgian swimmer

Personal information
- Full name: Georges Gaspard Thomas Lemaire
- Born: 29 September 1899 Antwerp, Belgium
- Died: 8 March 1979 (aged 79)

Sport
- Sport: Swimming

Georges Gaspard Thomas Lemaire (29 September 1899 – 8 March 1979) was a Belgian swimmer. He competed in the men's 100 metre backstroke event at the 1920 Summer Olympics.
