= Boxing at the 1920 Summer Olympics – Heavyweight =

Boxing competitions

Men's heavyweight boxing at the Games of the VII Olympiad
- Venue: Antwerp Zoo auditorium
- Dates: August 21–24, 1920
- Competitors: 9 from 8 nations

Medalists
1st place, gold medalist(s)		Ronald Rawson	Great Britain
2nd place, silver medalist(s)		Søren Petersen	Denmark
3rd place, bronze medalist(s)		Xavier Eluère	France

The men's heavyweight event was part of the boxing programme at the 1920 Summer Olympics. The weight class was the heaviest contested, allowing boxers weighing over 175 pounds (79.4 kilograms). The competition was held from August 21, 1920 to August 24, 1920. Nine boxers from eight nations competed.

== Results ==
Round of 16
Xavier Eluère (FRA)	W
Mariano Barbaresi (ITA)	L

Quarterfinals
Xavier Eluère (FRA)	W
Sigurd Hoel (NOR)	L
Ronald Rawson (GBR)	W
Samuel Stewart (USA)	L
William Spengler (USA)	W
Jean Creusen (BEL)	L
Søren Petersen (DEN)	W
Frank Dove (GBR)	L

Semifinals
Xavier Eluère (FRA)	L
Ronald Rawson (GBR)	W
William Spengler (USA)	L
Søren Petersen (DEN)	W

Final
Ronald Rawson (GBR)	W
Søren Petersen (DEN)	L
Bronze medal bout
Xavier Eluère (FRA)	W
William Spengler (USA)	L

== Sources ==
- Belgium Olympic Committee (1957). Olympic Games Antwerp 1920: Official Report (in French).
- Wudarski, Pawel (1999). "Wyniki Igrzysk Olimpijskich" (in Polish).
