= Thomas Holdstock =

South African boxer

Personal information
- Nationality: South African
- Born: 10 August 1894
- Died: 28 August 1970 (aged 76)

Sport
- Sport: Boxing

Thomas Holdstock (10 August 1894 – 28 August 1970) was a South African boxer. He competed in the men's light heavyweight event at the 1920 Summer Olympics. At the 1920 Summer Olympics, he defeated Johan Clementz of Norway, before losing to Eddie Eagan of the United States.
