= Santorre Derossi Di Santa Rosa =

Italian equestrian

Personal information
- Nationality: Italian
- Born: 21 April 1894; Venice, Italy
- Died: 24 March 1981 (aged 86)

Sport
- Sport: Equestrian

Santorre Derossi Di Santa Rosa (21 April 1894 – 24 March 1981) was an Italian equestrian. He competed in the individual jumping event at the 1920 Summer Olympics.
