= Jean Creusen =

Belgian boxer

Personal information
- Nationality: Belgian
- Born: 6 August 1893
- Died: Unknown

Sport
- Sport: Boxing

Jean Creusen (born 6 August 1893, date of death unknown) was a Belgian boxer. He competed in the men's heavyweight event at the 1920 Summer Olympics.
