= Johan Clementz =

Norwegian boxer

Johan Fog Clementz (27 September 1894 – 14 February 1952) was a Norwegian boxer who competed in the 1920 Summer Olympics. In 1920, he was eliminated in the first round of the light heavyweight class after losing his fight to Thomas Holdstock.
