= Alessandro Valerio =

Italian horse rider

Medal record

Men's Equestrian

Representing Italy

Olympic Games
Silver medal – second place	1920 Antwerp	Individual jumping

Alessandro Valerio (18 May 1881 – 28 May 1955) was an Italian horse rider. He competed in the 1920 Summer Olympics and, with his horse Cento, won the silver medal in the individual jumping event.
