= Gösta Runö =

Swedish modern pentathlete

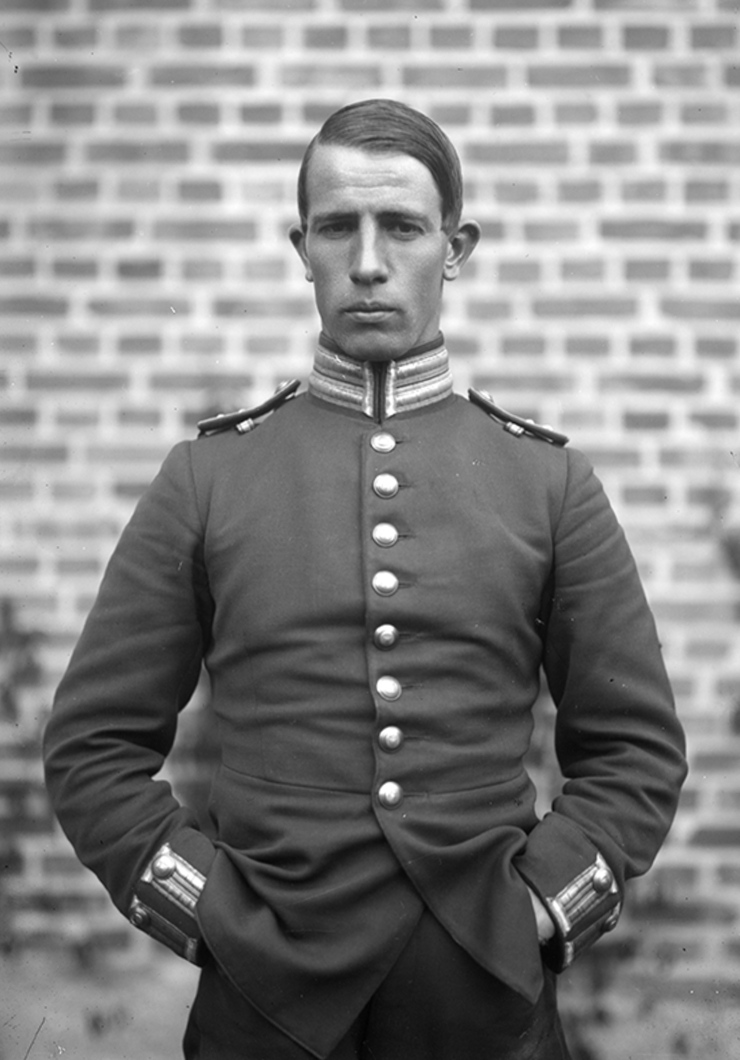

Personal information
- Born: 9 December 1896 Stockholm, Sweden
- Died: 13 November 1922 (aged 25) near Linköping, Sweden

Sport
- Sport: Modern pentathlon
- Club: I20 IF, Umeå
Medal record
Representing Sweden
Olympic Games
| Bronze medal – third place | 1920 Antwerp | Modern pentathlon |

Gösta Otto Runö (9 December 1896 – 13 November 1922) was a Swedish modern pentathlete who won a bronze medal at the 1920 Summer Olympics.

Runö was a military pilot with the rank of lieutenant. In 1922 he crashed his Phönix D III plane near Linköping and died, aged 25.
