= Lars von Stockenström =

Swedish equestrian

Personal information
- Nationality: Swedish
- Born: 13 December 1894 Stockholm, Sweden
- Died: 25 July 1968 (aged 73) Stockholm, Sweden

Sport
- Sport: Equestrian

Lars von Stockenström (13 December 1894 – 25 July 1968) was a Swedish equestrian. He competed in the individual jumping event at the 1920 Summer Olympics.
