= Ruggero Ubertalli =

Italian equestrian

Personal information
- Nationality: Italian
- Born: 15 March 1877; Biella, Italy
- Died: 7 September 1973 (aged 96)

Sport
- Sport: Equestrian

Ruggero Ubertalli (15 March 1877 – 7 September 1973) was an Italian equestrian. Born in Biella, Italy, he competed in the individual jumping event at the 1920 Summer Olympics.
