= Samuel Stewart (boxer) =

American boxer

Samuel Gibson Stewart (November 29, 1895 – August 29, 1950) was an American boxer who competed in the 1920 Summer Olympics. He was born in Kansas and died in San Francisco, California. In 1920 he was eliminated in the quarter-finals of the heavyweight class after losing his fight to the eventual gold medalist Ronald Rawson.
