= Evangelos Menexis =

Greek weightlifter

Personal information
- Nationality: Greek

Sport
- Sport: Weightlifting

Evangelos Menexis was a Greek weightlifter. He competed in the men's lightweight event at the 1920 Summer Olympics.
