= Allan Ekman =

Swedish equestrian

Personal information
- Nationality: Swedish
- Born: 2 December 1891 Malmö, Sweden
- Died: 25 February 1950 (aged 58) Stockholm, Sweden

Sport
- Sport: Equestrian

Allan Ekman (2 December 1891 – 25 February 1950) was a Swedish equestrian. He competed in the individual jumping event at the 1920 Summer Olympics.
