= Marinus Ringelberg =

Dutch weightlifter

Personal information
- Nickname: Tinus
- Nationality: Dutch
- Born: 24 December 1892; Rotterdam, Netherlands
- Died: 1940 (aged 47–48)

Sport
- Sport: Weightlifting

Marinus "Tinus" Ringelberg (24 December 1892 – 1940) was a Dutch weightlifter. He competed in the men's middleweight event at the 1920 Summer Olympics.
