= Hugh Brown (boxer) =

British boxer (1894–1935)

Personal information
- Nationality: British
- Born: 2 February 1894 Tewin, Hertfordshire, England
- Died: 22 August 1935 (aged 41) Johannesburg, South Africa

Sport
- Sport: Boxing

Hugh Brown (2 February 1894 – 22 August 1935) was a British boxer who competed in the 1920 Summer Olympics. In 1920 he finished fourth in the light heavyweight class after losing the bronze medal bout to Harold Franks.

Brown won the 1914 ABA Middleweight Championship boxing for Belsize ABC. After World War I, he stepped up in weight and won the 1919 ABA Heavyweight Championship. He would probably have won further A.B.A titles if the war had not stopped the Championships for four years.

In 1921, he became the World Amateur Light Heavyweight champion when boxing out of Aylesbury.

Brown died on 22 August 1935, at the age of 41.
