= Asbjørn Wang =

Norwegian swimmer

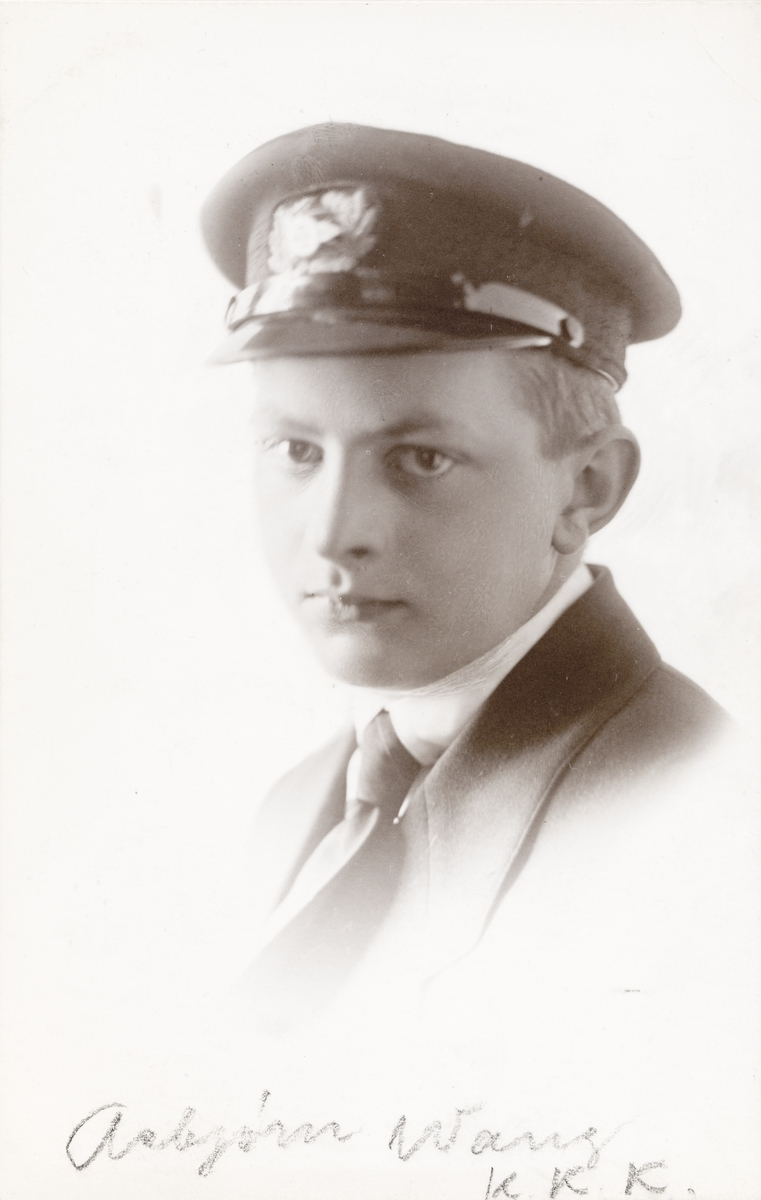

Personal information
- Born: 28 September 1899 Kristiania, Norway
- Died: 16 January 1966 (aged 66)

Sport
- Sport: Swimming

Asbjørn Rudolf Wang (28 September 1899 – 16 January 1966) was a Norwegian sport swimmer.

He was born in Kristiania. He competed at the 1920 Summer Olympics, where he reached the semifinals in 100 metre backstroke. He placed fourth in his heat in the semifinal but did not qualify for the final.
