= Paul Michelet =

Norwegian equestrian

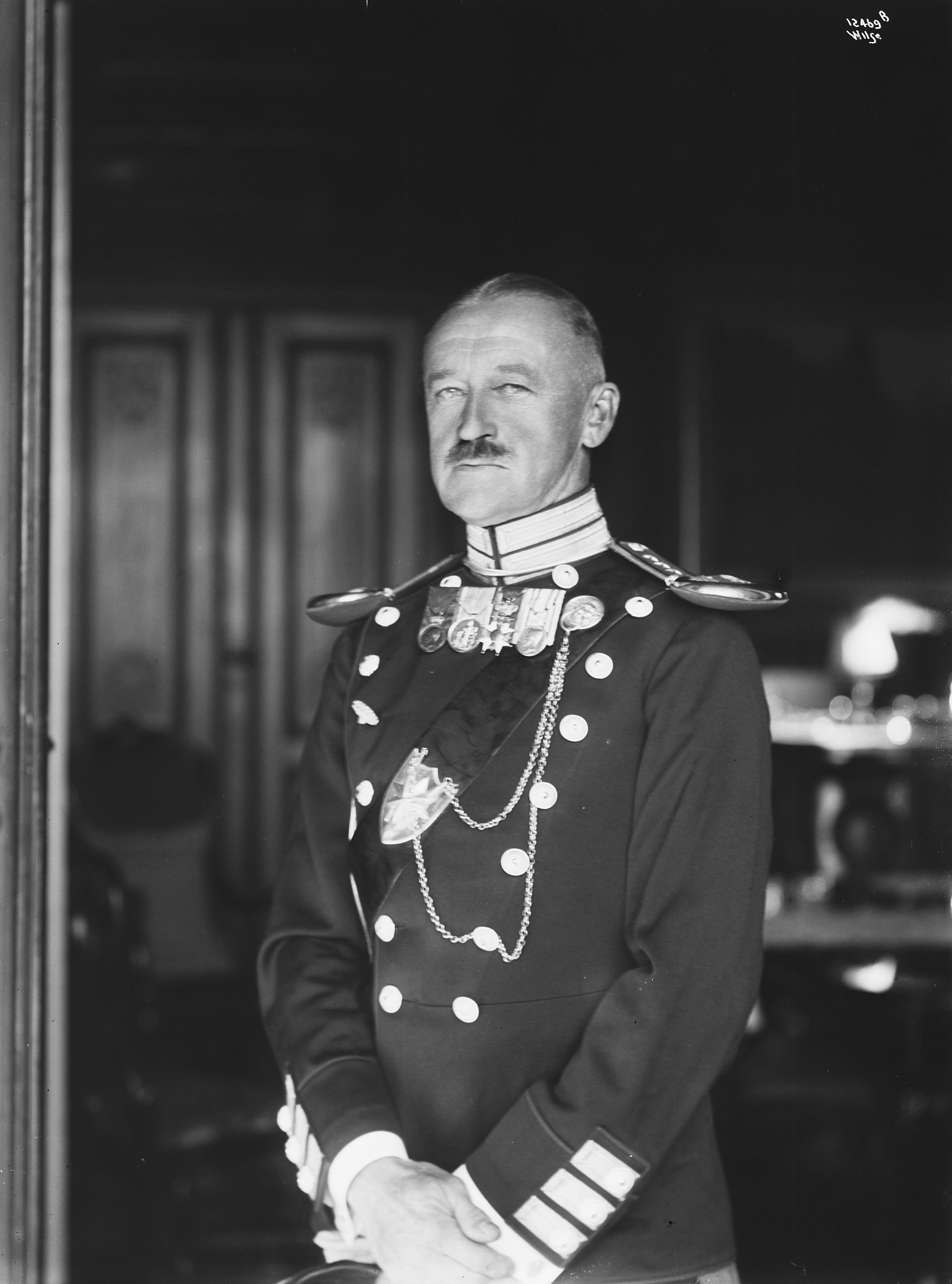

Personal information
- Nationality: Norwegian
- Born: 23 September 1880 Halden
- Died: 20 November 1958 (aged 78)

Sport
- Sport: Equestrian

Paul Michelet (23 September 1880 – 20 November 1958) was a Norwegian horse rider. He was born in Halden. He competed at the 1920 Summer Olympics in Antwerp, where he placed fourth in individual jumping. He also competed at the 1928 Summer Olympics.
