= Rudolf Ekström =

Finnish weightlifter

Personal information
- Nationality: Finnish
- Born: 14 April 1895 Helsinki, Finland
- Died: 16 January 1971 (aged 75) Helsinki, Finland

Sport
- Sport: Weightlifting

Rudolf Edvard Ekström (14 April 1895 – 16 January 1971) was a Finnish weightlifter. He competed in the men's light heavyweight event at the 1920 Summer Olympics.
