= Ronald Rawson =

English boxer

Personal information
- Nationality: British (English)
- Born: 17 June 1892 Kensington, London, England
- Died: 30 March 1952 (aged 59) Kensington, London, England

Sport
- Sport: boxing
Medal record
Representing Great Britain
Men's Boxing
| Gold medal – first place | 1920 Antwerp | Heavyweight |

Ronald Rawson Rawson MC & Two Bars (17 June 1892 – 30 March 1952) was an English heavyweight professional boxer, who won a gold medal in Boxing at the 1920 Summer Olympics for Great Britain.

== Amateur boxing career ==
He was the ABA Heavyweight Champion of Great Britain in 1920 and 1921. In 1920 he won the Olympic Gold Medal in Antwerp in the heavyweight division (from 1920 to 1936 this was 79.38 kg/175 lb+), defeating Danish boxer Søren Petersen in the final.

Although he only boxed as an Amateur, he did meet the professional boxer Jack Bloomfield in a "supposed 'exhibition' bout at a charity show at the Brighton Pavilion", where he suffered a knockout defeat in round three.

== Olympic results ==
- 1st round bye
- Defeated Samuel Stewart (United States)
- Defeated Xavier Eluère (France)
- Defeated Søren Petersen (Denmark)
