= Equestrian at the 1920 Summer Olympics – Individual dressage =

Equestrian at the Olympics

Individual dressage at the Games of the VII Olympiad
- Venue: Olympisch Stadion
- Dates: 7–9 September
- Competitors: 17 from 5 nations

Medalists
1st place, gold medalist(s)		Janne Lundblad	Sweden
2nd place, silver medalist(s)		Bertil Sandström	Sweden
3rd place, bronze medalist(s)		Hans von Rosen	Sweden

The individual dressage event was part of the equestrian programme at the 1920 Summer Olympics.

== Results ==
Place	Equestrian	Score
1	Janne Lundblad and Uno (SWE)	27.9375
2	Bertil Sandström and Sabel (SWE)	26.3125
3	Hans von Rosen and Running Sister (SWE)	25.1250
4	Wilhelm von Essen and Nomeg (SWE)	24.8750
5	Hédoin de Maille and Chéri Biribi (FRA)	23.9375
6	Michel Artola and Plumard (FRA)	23.4375
7	Gaston de Trannoy and Bouton d'Or (BEL)	23.1250
8	Jens Falkenberg and Hjördis (NOR)	22.3750
9	Jean Esnault-Pelterie and Saint James (FRA)	21.8125
9	Antoine Boudet and Ambleville (FRA)	21.8125
11	Emmanuel de Blommaert and Grizzly (BEL)	20.4375
12	Henri Mehu and Callipyge (FRA)	20.1250
13	Marcel Blanchard and Lenotre (FRA)	20.0000
14	Sloan Doak and Singlen (USA)	19.3125
14	Harry Chamberlin and Harebell (USA)	19.3125
14	John Burke Barry and Chiswell (USA)	19.3125
DSQ ^{1}	Gustaf Adolf Boltenstern and Iron (SWE)	26.1875

^{1} Boltenstern originally finished third, but was disqualified for practicing in the ring prior to the competition.

== Sources ==
- Belgium Olympic Committee (1957). Olympic Games Antwerp 1920: Official Report (in French).
- Wudarski, Pawel (1999). "Wyniki Igrzysk Olimpijskich" (in Polish). Archived from the original on 16 February 2009.
