= Mariano Barbaresi =

Italian boxer

Mariano Barbaresi (7 June 1895 – 14 October 1928) was an Italian boxer who competed in the 1920 Summer Olympics. In 1920 he was eliminated in the first round of the heavyweight class after losing his fight to the upcoming bronze medalist Xavier Eluère. He was born in Rome.
