= Boxing at the 1920 Summer Olympics – Light heavyweight =

Boxing competitions

Men's light heavyweight boxing at the Games of the VII Olympiad
- Venue: Antwerp Zoo auditorium
- Dates: August 21–24, 1920
- Competitors: 11 from 6 nations

Medalists
1st place, gold medalist(s)		Eddie Eagan	United States
2nd place, silver medalist(s)		Sverre Sørsdal	Norway
3rd place, bronze medalist(s)		Harold Franks	Great Britain

The men's light heavyweight event was part of the boxing programme at the 1920 Summer Olympics. The weight class was the second-heaviest contested, and allowed boxers of up to 175 pounds (79.4 kilograms). The competition was held from August 21, 1920, to August 24, 1920. 11 boxers from six nations competed.

== Results ==
Round of 16
Thomas Holdstock (RSA)	W
Johan Clementz (NOR)	L
Sverre Sørsdal (NOR)	W
René Darbou (FRA)	L
Edwin Schell (USA)	W
Jim MacGregor (RSA)	L

Quarterfinals
Eddie Eagan (USA)	W
Thomas Holdstock (RSA)	L
Harold Franks (GBR)	W
Louis Piochelle (FRA)	L
Hugh Brown (GBR)	W
Emil Andreasen (DEN)	L
Sverre Sørsdal (NOR)	W
Edwin Schell (USA)	L

Semifinals
Eddie Eagan (USA)	W
Harold Franks (GBR)	L
Hugh Brown (GBR)	L
Sverre Sørsdal (NOR)	W

Final
Eddie Eagan (USA)	W
Sverre Sørsdal (NOR)	L
Bronze medal bout
Harold Franks (GBR)	W
Hugh Brown (GBR)	L

== Sources ==
- Belgium Olympic Committee (1957). Olympic Games Antwerp 1920: Official Report (in French).
- Wudarski, Pawel (1999). "Wyniki Igrzysk Olimpijskich" (in Polish).
