= Sigurd Hoel (boxer) =

Norwegian boxer

Sigurd Emanuel Hoel (15 August 1897 – 21 July 1977) was a Norwegian boxer who competed in the 1920 Summer Olympics. In 1920, he was eliminated in the quarter-finals of the heavyweight class after losing his fight to Xavier Eluère.
