= Louis Piochelle =

French boxer

Louis Piochelle (12 December 1888 – 15 September 1939) was a French boxer who competed in the 1920 Summer Olympics. In 1920, he was eliminated in the quarter-finals of the light heavyweight class after losing his fight to Harold Franks.
