= Swimming at the 1920 Summer Olympics – Men's 100 metre backstroke =

Men's 100 meter backstroke at the Games of the VII Olympiad
- Venue: Stade Nautique d'Antwerp
- Dates: 22 August 1920 (semifinals); 23 August 1920 (final)
- Competitors: 12 from 6 nations
- Winning time: 1:15:2

Medalists
| 1st place, gold medalist(s) | | Warren Kealoha | United States |
| 2nd place, silver medalist(s) | | Ray Kegeris | United States |
| 3rd place, bronze medalist(s) | | Gérard Blitz | Belgium |

The men's 100 metre backstroke was a swimming event held as part of the swimming at the 1920 Summer Olympics programme. It was the fourth appearance of the event.

A total of 12 swimmers from six nations competed in the event, which was held on Sunday, 22 August and on Monday, 23 August 1920.

== Records ==
These were the standing world and Olympic records (in minutes) prior to the 1920 Summer Olympics.

| World record | 1:15.6 | (Germany) Otto Fahr | Magdeburg (GER) | 29 April 1912 |
| Olympic record | 1:20.8 | (United States) Harry Hebner | Stockholm (SWE) | 10 July 1912 |

In the first semi-final Ray Kegeris bettered the Olympic record to 1:17.8 minutes. In the second semi-final Warren Kealoha set a new world record with 1:14.8 minutes.

== Results ==
=== Semifinals ===
Sunday, 22 August 1920: The fastest two in each semi-final and the faster of the two third-placed swimmer advanced to the final.

==== Semifinal 1 ====
| Place | Swimmer | Time | Qual. |
|---|---|---|---|
| 1 | Ray Kegeris (USA) | 1:17.8 | Q OR |
| 2 | Harold Kruger (USA) | 1:19.0 | Q |
| 3 | Gaspard Lemaire (BEL) | 1:28.0 | |
| 4 | Asbjørn Wang (NOR) | 1:28.2 | |
| 5 | Henri Matter (FRA) | | |
| 6 | George Robertson (GBR) | | |

==== Semifinal 2 ====
| Place | Swimmer | Time | Qual. |
|---|---|---|---|
| 1 | Warren Kealoha (USA) | 1:14.8 | Q WR |
| 2 | Gérard Blitz (BEL) | 1:18.6 | Q |
| 3 | Perry McGillivray (USA) | 1:20.4 | q |
| 4 | Per Holmström (SWE) | 1:26.0 | |
| 5 | George Webster (GBR) | | |
| 6 | Daniel Lehu (FRA) | | |

=== Final ===
Monday, 23 August 1920:

| Place | Swimmer | Time |
|---|---|---|
| 1 | Warren Kealoha (USA) | 1:15.2 |
| 2 | Ray Kegeris (USA) | 1:16.8 |
| 3 | Gérard Blitz (BEL) | 1:19.0 |
| 4 | Perry McGillivray (USA) | 1:19.4 |
| 5 | Harold Kruger (USA) | |

== Notes ==
- Belgium Olympic Committee (1957). Olympic Games Antwerp 1920: Official Report (in French).
- Wudarski, Pawel (1999). "Wyniki Igrzysk Olimpijskich" (in Polish).
