= Pieter Belmer =

Dutch weightlifter (1892–1979)

Personal information
- Nationality: Dutch
- Born: 7 August 1892 Amsterdam, Netherlands
- Died: 24 November 1979 (aged 87) Hilversum, Netherlands

Sport
- Sport: Weightlifting

Pieter Leonard Belmer (7 August 1892 – 24 November 1979) was a Dutch weightlifter. He competed in the men's middleweight event at the 1920 Summer Olympics.
