= Vincent Erwin =

American equestrian (1887–1967)

Personal information
- Born: Vincent P. Erwin; August 9, 1887 Chapman, Kansas, U.S.
- Died: March 15, 1967 (aged 79) Colorado Springs, Colorado, U.S.
- Military career
- Allegiance: United States
- Branch: Maryland Army National Guard
- Rank: Major
- Unit: 110th Field Artillery

Sport
- Sport: Equestrian; Polo

Vincent Erwin (August 9, 1887 – March 15, 1967) was an American equestrian. He competed in the team jumping event at the 1920 Summer Olympics.

== Early life ==
Vincent P. Erwin was born on August 9, 1887, in Chapman, Kansas to Ellen (née McGrath) and John Erwin. His father was one of the first settlers of Chapman and worked as a postmaster and ranch operator. Erwin graduated from Dickinson County High School in Dickinson County, Kansas in 1906. Senator Chester I. Long selected Erwin to attend the United States Naval Academy in 1907. He was captain of the second squad of the Navy Midshipmen football team and a member of the first team of the Navy Midshipmen baseball team. He graduated from the Naval Academy in 1911. Following graduation, Erwin attended Fort Riley's cavalry school and completed a course.

== Career ==
In 1920, Erwin attended the 1920 Summer Olympics as part of the team jumping equestrian event. He rode a horse raised on the Erwin farm in Chapman.

Erwin competed in polo in the 1920s. He was given the nickname "Little Red", to distinguish himself from his brother, nicknamed "Big Red", another army polo player. He served as major and field artillery instructor for the 110th Field Artillery of the Maryland Army National Guard and was stationed in Pikesville, Maryland. He received a concussion from a fall from a pony at the Rhode Island Cup polo tournament at Narragansett Pier, Rhode Island on July 30, 1923 and was hospitalized for a period of six months at Walter Reed Hospital. He walked with a cane following the injury.
