= Søren Petersen (weightlifter) =

Danish weightlifter

Personal information
- Nationality: Danish
- Born: 21 June 1890; Rosenholm, Denmark
- Died: 6 March 1971 (aged 80); Aarhus, Denmark

Sport
- Sport: Weightlifting

Søren Petersen (21 June 1890 – 6 March 1971) was a Danish weightlifter. He competed in the men's light heavyweight event at the 1920 Summer Olympics.
