= Ferdinand de la Serna =

Belgian equestrian

Personal information
- Nationality: Belgian
- Born: 21 May 1894 Fouleng, Belgium
- Died: 17 April 1973 (aged 78) Ixelles, Belgium

Sport
- Sport: Equestrian

Ferdinand de la Serna (21 May 1894 – 17 April 1973) was a Belgian equestrian. He competed in the individual jumping event at the 1920 Summer Olympics.
