= Thierry de Briey =

Belgian equestrian

Personal information
- Nationality: Belgian
- Born: 29 December 1895 Brussels, Belgium
- Died: 11 April 1945 (aged 49) Bergen-Belsen, Germany

Sport
- Sport: Equestrian

Thierry de Briey (29 December 1895 – 11 April 1945) was a Belgian equestrian. He competed in the individual jumping event at the 1920 Summer Olympics. A member of the Belgian Resistance, he was killed in the Bergen-Belsen concentration camp during World War II.

== Personal life ==
In 1940, after the invasion of Belgium by German forces, de Briey became a member of the Belgian Resistance. He was arrested in February 1944 and was first deported to Buchenwald and then Harzungen. After the evacuation of the latter camp, de Briey was forced to march to the Bergen-Belsen camp on foot; he died in the camp on 25 April 1945.
