= Giulio Monti =

Italian weightlifter

Personal information
- Nationality: Italian
- Born: 18 December 1889; Marradi, Italy
- Died: 12 January 1960 (aged 70); Genoa, Italy

Sport
- Sport: Weightlifting

Giulio Luigi Antonio Monti (18 December 1889 – 12 January 1960) was an Italian weightlifter. He competed in the men's lightweight event at the 1920 Summer Olympics.
