= Ejnar Jensen =

Danish weightlifter

Personal information
- Nationality: Danish
- Born: 17 February 1896; Aarhus, Denmark
- Died: 31 October 1973 (aged 77); Aarhus, Denmark

Sport
- Sport: Weightlifting

Ejnar Jensen (17 February 1896 – 31 October 1973) was a Danish weightlifter. He competed in the men's heavyweight event at the 1920 Summer Olympics.
