= Jan Welter =

Dutch weightlifter

Personal information
- Nationality: Dutch
- Born: 27 February 1895; Amsterdam, Netherlands
- Died: 19 June 1960 (aged 65); Badhoevedorp, Netherlands

Sport
- Sport: Weightlifting

Jan Welter (27 February 1895 – 19 June 1960) was a Dutch weightlifter. He competed in the men's light heavyweight event at the 1920 Summer Olympics.
