= Lionel Van De Roye =

Belgian weightlifter (1883–??)

Leonardus Augustus Van De Roye
Personal information
- Nationality: Belgian
- Born: 3 June 1883 Antwerp, Belgium

Sport
- Sport: Weightlifting

Leonard Van De Roye (born 3 June 1883) was a Belgian weightlifter. He competed in the men's light heavyweight event at the 1920 Summer Olympics.
