= Marcel Marchand =

Belgian weightlifter

Personal information
- Nationality: Belgian

Sport
- Sport: Weightlifting

Marcel Marchand was a Belgian weightlifter. He competed in the men's middleweight event at the 1920 Summer Olympics.
