= Emilio Benini =

Italian equestrian

Personal information
- Nationality: Italian
- Born: 5 July 1891 Florence, Italy
- Died: 6 October 1958 (aged 67) Treviso, Italy

Sport
- Sport: Equestrian

Emilio Benini (5 July 1891 – 6 October 1958) was an Italian equestrian. He competed in the individual jumping event at the 1920 Summer Olympics.
