= William Spengler =

American boxer

William Frederick Spengler (March 31, 1889 – May 3, 1979) was an American boxer who competed in the 1920 Summer Olympics. He was born on March 31, 1889, in New York City. In 1920 he finished fourth in the heavyweight class after losing the bronze medal bout to Xavier Eluère. He died in May 1979, aged 90, in Long Lake, New York.

== 1920 Olympic results ==
Below is the record of William Spengler, an American heavyweight boxer who competed at the 1920 Antwerp Olympics:

- Round of 16: bye
- Quarterfinal: defeated Victor Creusen (Belgium)
- Semifinal: lost to Soren Peterson (Denmark)
- Bronze Medal Bout: lost to Xavier Eluere (France)
