= Percy Mills (weightlifter) =

British weightlifter

Personal information
- Nationality: British
- Born: 5 January 1896 Wakefield, England
- Died: 3 March 1971 (aged 75) Huddersfield, England

Sport
- Sport: Weightlifting

Percy Mills (5 January 1896 – 3 March 1971) was a British weightlifter. He competed in the men's lightweight event at the 1920 Summer Olympics.
