= Herman de Gaiffier d'Hestroy =

Belgian equestrian

Olympic medal record

Men's Equestrian
Silver medal – second place	1920 Antwerp	Team jumping

Herman Baron de Gaiffier d'Hestroy (18 May 1895 - 20 October 1960) was a Belgian horse rider who competed in the 1920 Summer Olympics. In 1920, he and his horse Miss won the silver medal in the team jumping competition.
