= Florimond Rooms =

Belgian weightlifter

Olympic medal record

Men's Weightlifting
Bronze medal – third place	1920 Antwerp	Lightweight

Georges Florimond Rooms (born 1894, date of death unknown) was a Belgian weightlifter who competed in the 1920 Summer Olympics. In 1920, he won the bronze medal in the lightweight class.
