= Pierre Charpentier =

French ice hockey player

- Born: 28 March 1888; Paris, France
- Position: Defence
- National team: France
- Playing career: 1907–1925

Pierre Joseph Charpentier (born 28 March 1888, date of death unknown) was a French ice hockey player. He competed in the men's tournaments at the 1920 Summer Olympics and the 1924 Winter Olympics.
