= Edmond L'Hotte =

French equestrian

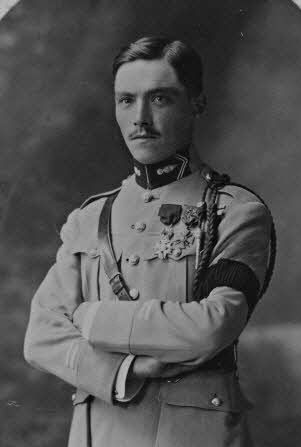
- l'Hotte in 1921

Personal information
- Nationality: French
- Born: 10 January 1892 Versailles, France
- Died: 11 June 1970 (aged 78) Paris, France

Sport
- Sport: Equestrian

Edmond L'Hotte (10 January 1892 – 11 June 1970) was a French equestrian. He competed in the individual jumping event at the 1920 Summer Olympics.
