= Jean Esnault-Pelterie =

French equestrian

Personal information
- Nationality: French

Sport
- Sport: Equestrian

Jean Esnault-Pelterie was a French equestrian. He competed in the individual dressage event at the 1920 Summer Olympics.
