= Joe Greenwald =

American equestrian

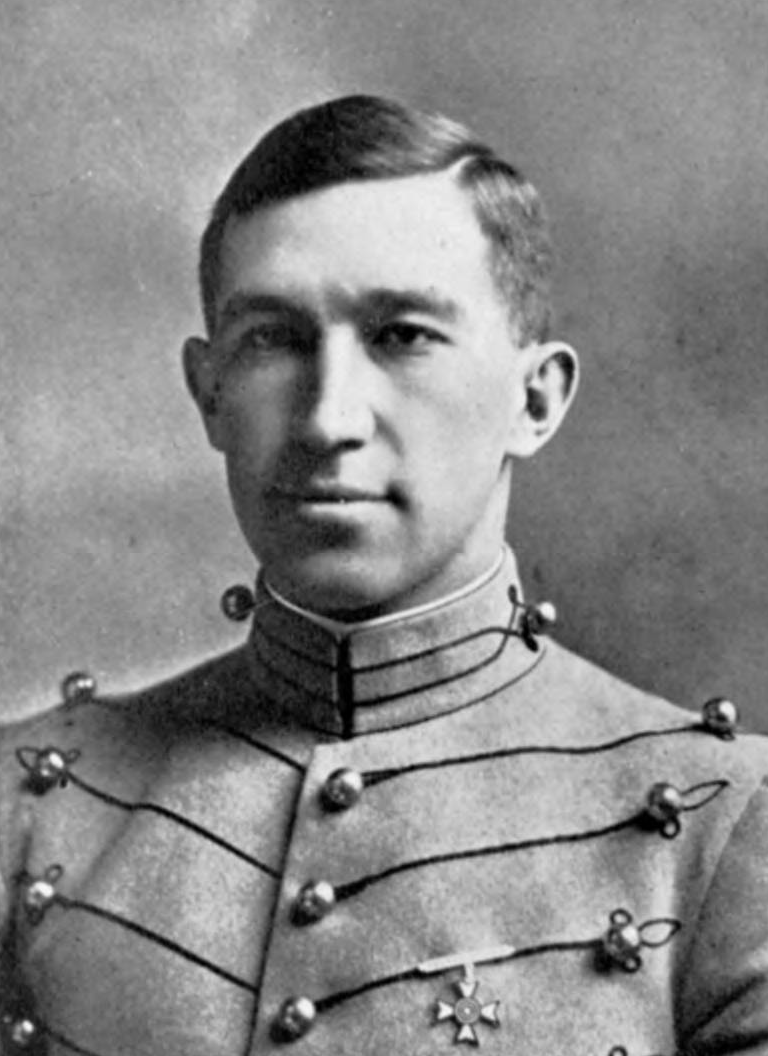

Personal information
- Full name: Karl Christopher Joe Greenwald
- Born: December 2, 1888 Iowa, United States
- Died: May 19, 1986 (aged 97) San Antonio, Texas, United States

Sport
- Sport: Equestrian

Joe Greenwald (December 2, 1888 – May 19, 1986) was an American equestrian. He competed in the team jumping event at the 1920 Summer Olympics.
