= Jean Vaquette =

French weightlifter

Personal information
- Nationality: French

Sport
- Sport: Weightlifting

Jean Vaquette was a French weightlifter. He competed in the men's lightweight event at the 1920 Summer Olympics.
