= Marcel Blanchard =

French equestrian

Personal information
- Nationality: French
- Born: 19 August 1890 Paris, France
- Died: 11 August 1977 (aged 86) Chantilly, Oise, France

Sport
- Sport: Equestrian

Marcel Blanchard (19 August 1890 – 11 August 1977) was a French equestrian. He competed in the individual dressage event at the 1920 Summer Olympics.
