= Pietro Bianchi (weightlifter) =

Italian weightlifter (1895–1962)

Medal record

Men's weightlifting

Representing Italy

Olympic Games
Silver medal – second place	1920 Antwerp	Middleweight

Pietro Ubaldo Bianchi (14 March 1895 – 21 May 1962) was an Italian weightlifter who competed in the 1920 Summer Olympics. In 1920 he won the silver medal in the middleweight class.
