= Henri Horment =

French equestrian

Personal information
- Nationality: French
- Born: 3 March 1883 Féas, France
- Died: 6 July 1924 (aged 41) La Roche-sur-Yon, France

Sport
- Sport: Equestrian

Henri Horment (3 March 1883 – 6 July 1924) was a French equestrian. He competed in the team jumping event at the 1920 Summer Olympics.
