= Equestrian at the 1920 Summer Olympics – Individual jumping =

Equestrian at the Olympics

Individual jumping at the Games of the VII Olympiad
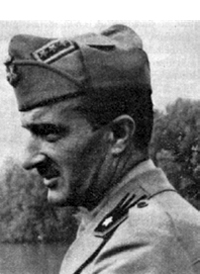
- Tommaso Lequio di Assaba
- Venue: Olympisch Stadion
- Date: 12 September
- Competitors: 25 from 6 nations
- Winning score: 2.00

Medalists
1st place, gold medalist(s)		Tommaso Lequio di Assaba; Italy
2nd place, silver medalist(s)		Alessandro Valerio; Italy
3rd place, bronze medalist(s)		Carl Gustaf Lewenhaupt; Sweden

The individual show jumping event was part of the equestrian programme at the 1920 Summer Olympics. The competition was held on 12 September at the Olympisch Stadion in Antwerp. There were 25 competitors from 6 nations. The event was won by Tommaso Lequio di Assaba of Italy, with his teammate Alessandro Valerio earning silver. Carl Gustaf Lewenhaupt of Sweden took bronze. They were the first medals in individual jumping for both nations.

== Background ==
This was the third appearance of the event, which had first been held at the 1900 Summer Olympics and has been held at every Summer Olympics at which equestrian sports have been featured (that is, excluding 1896, 1904, and 1908). It is the oldest event on the current programme, the only one that was held in 1900.

The United States made its debut in the event. Belgium and France both competed for the third time, the only nations to have competed at each appearance of the event to that point.

== Competition format ==
The 800 metre course consisted of 14 obstacles, all of which were 1.3 to 1.4 meters high. The water was a maximum of 4 meters in width. The pair with the fewest faults was the winner.

The roster of faults was changed significantly from 1912. The faults possible in 1920 were: 2 points for a first refusal, 4 for a second, 6 for a third; 8 points for a horse falling; 4 points for the rider being unseated; 2 points for knocking an obstacle down with the horse's fore legs, 1 point for knocking it down with the hind legs; 1 point for the hind legs inside the end line of a long jump, 2 points for the fore legs inside the end line; and 2 points for going off-course. Touching the end line of a distance jump was now not penalized.

== Schedule ==
Date	Time	Round
Sunday, 12 September 1920	14:00	Final

== Results ==
Rank	Rider	Horse	Nation	Faults
1st place, gold medalist(s)	Tommaso Lequio di Assaba	Trebecco	Italy	2.00
2nd place, silver medalist(s)	Alessandro Valerio	Cento	Italy	3.00
3rd place, bronze medalist(s)	Carl Gustaf Lewenhaupt	Mon Coeur	Sweden	4.00
4	Paul Michelet	Raven	Norway	5.00
5	Ferdinand de la Serna	Arsinoe	Belgium	6.00
5	Lars von Stockenström	Reward	Sweden	6.00
7	Henry Allen	Don	United States	7.00
7	Santorre Derossi Di Santa Rosa	Neruccio	Italy	7.00
7	Roger Moeremans d'Emaüs	Sweet Girl	Belgium	7.00
10	Garibaldi Spighi	Virginia	Italy	8.00
10	Edmond L'Hotte	Kabyle	France	8.00
12	John Downer	Dick	United States	8.50
13	Eugen Johansen	Nökken	Norway	9.00
14	Åge Lundström	Eros	Sweden	9.75
15	Gustaf Kilman	Irving	Sweden	10.00
15	Jules Bonvalet	Weppelghem	Belgium	10.00
17	Ruggero Ubertalli	Proton	Italy	10.25
18	William West	Prince	United States	12.00
19	Emilio Benini	Passero	Italy	13.00
20	Jean Alquier-Bouffard	Dahlia	France	13.25
21	Thierry de Briey	Perfect Gentleman	Belgium	13.50
22	Franck Tisnés	Ugolin	France	17.00
23	Nils Åkerblom	Heikki	Sweden	19.50
24	Allan Ekman	Tagore	Sweden	21.50
25	Jacques Misonne	Gaucho	Belgium	23.25

== Sources ==
- Belgium Olympic Committee (1957). Olympic Games Antwerp 1920: Official Report (in French).
- Wudarski, Pawel (1999). "Wyniki Igrzysk Olimpijskich" (in Polish). Archived from the original on 16 February 2009.
