= Gino Mattiello =

Italian weightlifter

Personal information
- Nationality: Italian

Sport
- Sport: Weightlifting

Gino Mattiello was an Italian weightlifter. He competed in the men's light heavyweight event at the 1920 Summer Olympics.
