= John Downer (equestrian) =

American equestrian

Personal information
- Born: November 22, 1881 Charles Town, West Virginia, United States
- Died: January 28, 1977 (aged 95) Lexington, Virginia, United States

Sport
- Sport: Equestrian

John Downer (November 22, 1881 – January 28, 1977) was an American equestrian. He competed in the individual jumping event at the 1920 Summer Olympics.
