= Franck Tisnés =

French equestrian

Personal information
- Nationality: French
- Born: 15 December 1881; Castres, France
- Died: 12 December 1964 (aged 82); Castres, France

Sport
- Sport: Equestrian

Franck Tisnés (15 December 1881 – 12 December 1964) was a French equestrian. He competed in the individual jumping event at the 1920 Summer Olympics.
