= Suzanne Wurtz =

French swimmer

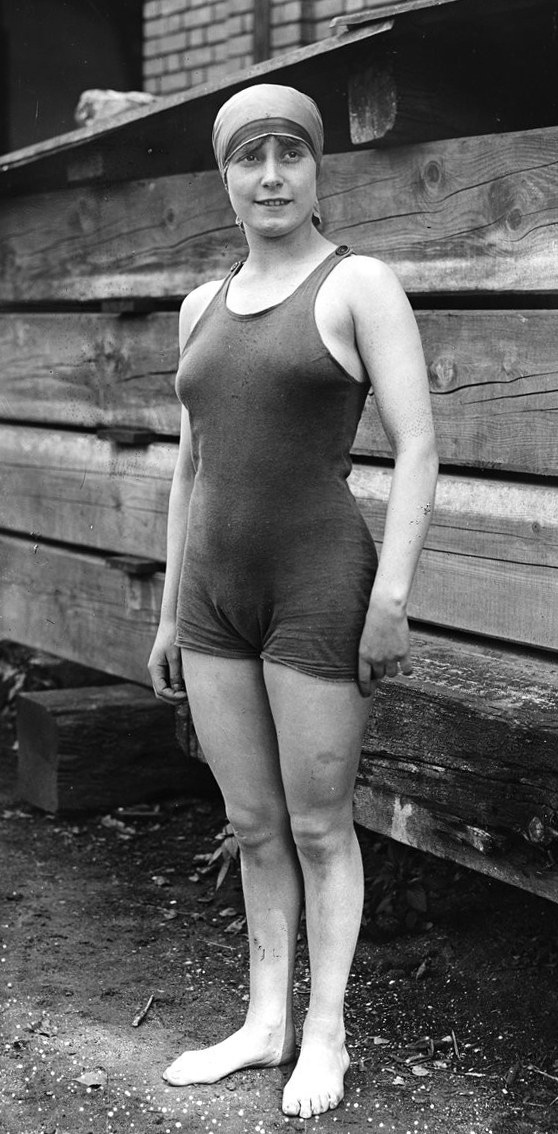
- Suzanne Wurtz in 1920

Personal information
- Born: 26 December 1900 Paris, France
- Died: 27 July 1982 (aged 81) Aix-en-Provence, France

Sport
- Sport: Swimming
- Club: USFSA

Suzanne Wurtz (26 December 1900 – 27 July 1982) was a French swimmer. She competed at the 1920 Summer Olympics in the 100 m and 300 m freestyle events, but failed to reach the finals.
