= Jean Alquier-Bouffard =

French equestrian

Personal information
- Nationality: French
- Born: 24 October 1893; Sorèze, France
- Died: 1 June 1922 (aged 28); Castres, France

Sport
- Sport: Equestrian

Jean Alquier-Bouffard (24 October 1893 – 1 June 1922) was a French equestrian. He competed in the individual jumping event at the 1920 Summer Olympics.
