= Antoine Boudet =

French equestrian

Jacques Boudet
Personal information
- Full name: Jacques Joseph Jean Boudet
- Nationality: French
- Born: 14 February 1883 Lamonzie-Saint-Martin, France
- Died: 4 November 1957 (aged 74) Troissy, France

Sport
- Sport: Equestrian

Jacques Boudet (14 February 1883 – 4 November 1957) was a French equestrian. He competed in the individual dressage event at the 1920 Summer Olympics.
