= André Coumans =

Belgian equestrian

Olympic medal record

Representing Belgium

Men's Equestrian
Silver medal – second place	1920 Antwerp	Team jumping

André Coumans (10 April 1893 – 8 March 1958) was a Belgian horse rider who competed in the 1920 Summer Olympics. In 1920, he and his horse Lisette won the silver medal in the team jumping competition.
