= René Darbou =

French boxer

Personal information
- Nationality: French

Sport
- Sport: Boxing

René Darbou was a French boxer. He competed in the men's light heavyweight event at the 1920 Summer Olympics.
