= Henri Laame =

Belgian equestrian (1891–1966)

Olympic medal record

Men's Equestrian
Silver medal – second place	1920 Antwerp	Team jumping

Henri Joseph Gedein Laame (31 August 1891 – 21 August 1966) was a Belgian horse rider who competed in the 1920 Summer Olympics and in the 1928 Summer Olympics. In 1920 he and his horse Biscuit won the silver medal in the team jumping competition.

Eight years later, he and his horse Belga finished eighth with the Belgian team in the team dressage competition after finishing 27th in the individual dressage event.
