= Louis Williquet =

Belgian weightlifter (1894–1937)

Olympic medal record

Men's Weightlifting
| Silver medal – second place | 1920 Antwerp | -67.5 kg |

Pierre Louis Florent Williquet (2 July 1894 – 3 February 1937) was a Belgian weightlifter who competed in the 1920 Summer Olympics. In 1920, he won the silver medal in the lightweight class.
