= Thorvald Hansen (weightlifter) =

Danish weightlifter

Personal information
- Nationality: Danish
- Born: 16 October 1891 Helsingør, Denmark
- Died: 13 February 1961 (aged 69) Helsingør, Denmark

Sport
- Sport: Weightlifting

Thorvald Emil Hansen (16 October 1891 – 13 February 1961) was a Danish weightlifter. He competed in the men's lightweight event at the 1920 Summer Olympics.
