= Camille Ledran =

French weightlifter

Personal information
- Nationality: French
- Born: 19 June 1889 Clichy, Hauts-de-Seine, France
- Died: 14 February 1970 (aged 80) Auxerre, France

Sport
- Sport: Weightlifting

Georges Camille Victor Ledran (19 June 1889 – 14 February 1970) was a French weightlifter. He competed in the men's middleweight event at the 1920 Summer Olympics.
