= Erik Pettersson (weightlifter) =

Swedish weightlifter

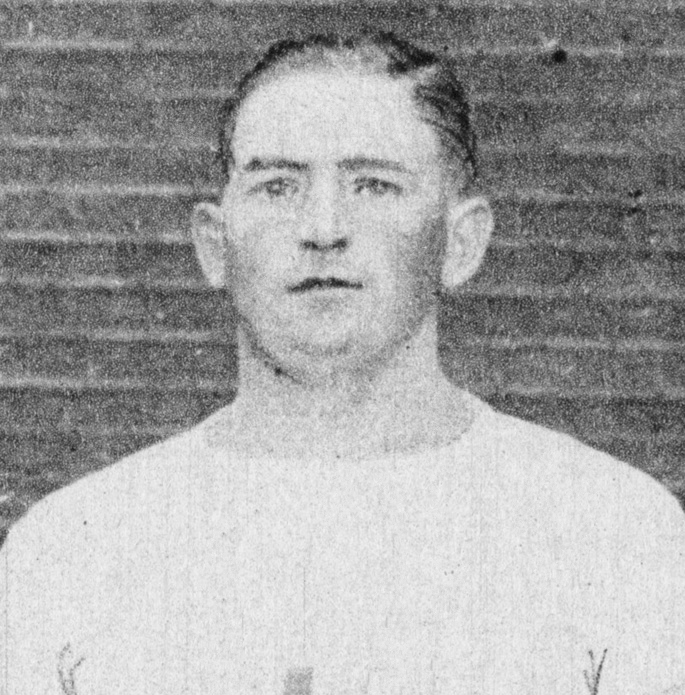

Personal information
- Born: 18 May 1890 Nyköping, Sweden
- Died: 4 April 1975 (aged 84) Stockholm, Sweden

Sport
- Sport: Weightlifting
- Club: Eskilstuna GAK
Medal record
Representing Sweden
Olympic Games
Bronze medal – third place	1920 Antwerp	−82.5 kg

Erik Albert Pettersson (18 May 1890 – 4 April 1975) was a Swedish weightlifter. He won a bronze medal in the light-heavyweight division (under 82.5 kg) at the 1920 Summer Olympics.
