= Edwin Schell =

American boxer

Edwin Wright Schell (November 14, 1900 – October 7, 1979) was an American boxer who competed in the 1920 Summer Olympics. He was born in Berwyn, Illinois and died in San Diego, California. In 1920, he was eliminated in the quarter-finals of the light heavyweight class after losing his fight to the eventual silver medalist Sverre Sørsdal.
