= Joseph Duchâteau =

French weightlifter

Personal information
- Nationality: French
- Born: 14 June 1885 Tours, France
- Died: 4 May 1953 (aged 67) Paris, France

Sport
- Sport: Weightlifting

Michel Joseph Duchâteau (14 June 1885 – 4 May 1953) was a French weightlifter. He competed in the men's heavyweight event at the 1920 Summer Olympics.
