= Pierre Lemoyne =

French equestrian

Personal information
- Nationality: French
- Born: 16 April 1891 Mont-de-Marsan, France
- Died: 30 July 1983 (aged 92) Saint-Sever, France

Sport
- Sport: Equestrian

Pierre Lemoyne (16 April 1891 – 30 July 1983) was a French equestrian. He competed in the team jumping event at the 1920 Summer Olympics.
