= Henri Matter =

French swimmer

Personal information
- Born: 16 July 1901
- Died: 30 May 1983 (aged 81) Paris, France

Sport
- Sport: Swimming

Marie Henri Matter (16 July 1901 – 30 May 1983) was a French swimmer. He competed in the men's 100 metre backstroke event at the 1920 Summer Olympics.
