= Rémy Weil =

French swimmer (1899–1943)

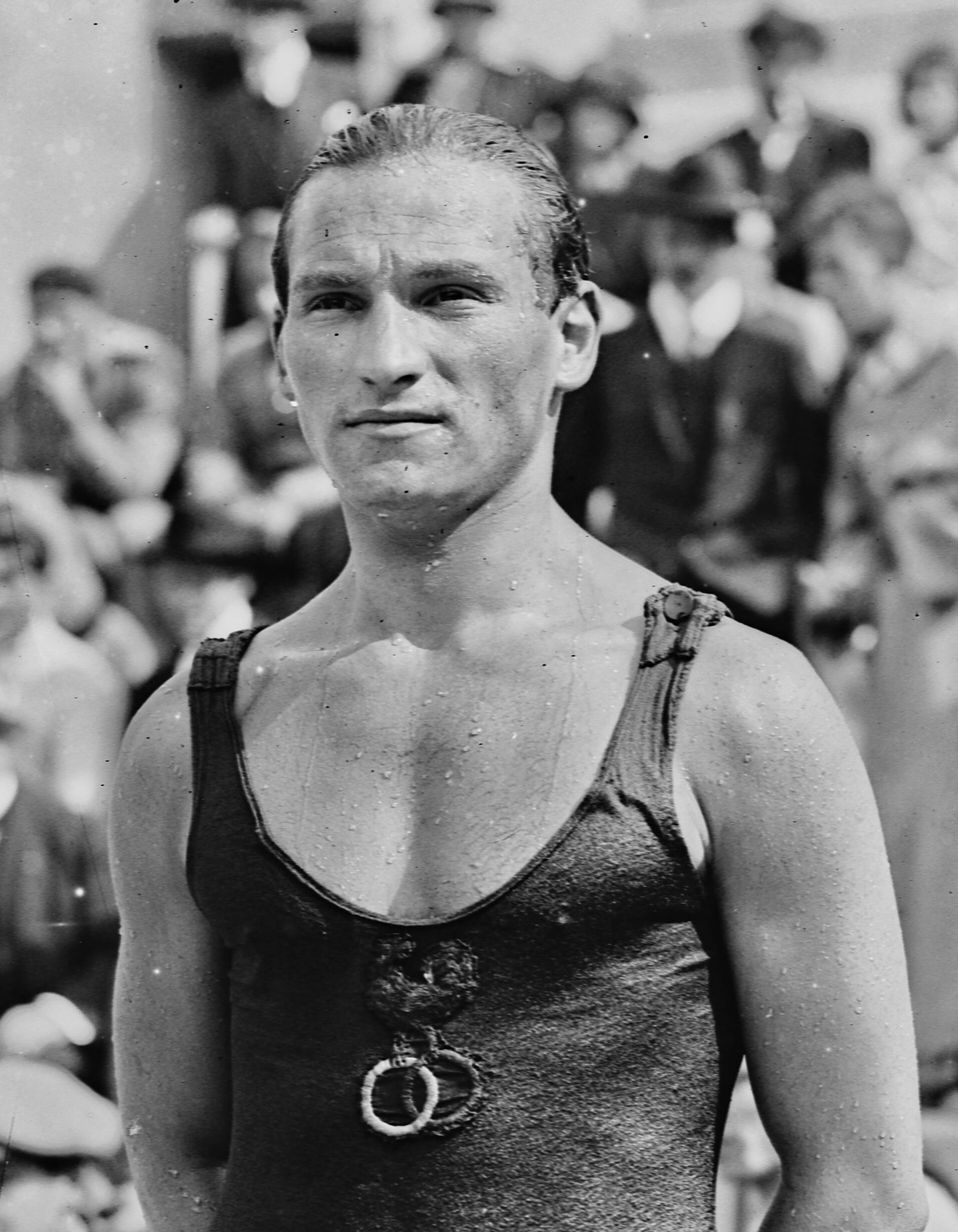

Personal information
- Born: 17 December 1899 Strasbourg, France
- Died: 20 November 1943 (aged 43) Auschwitz-Birkenau, German-occupied Poland

Sport
- Sport: Swimming
- Strokes: freestyle

Rémy Weil (17 December 1899 – 20 November 1943) was a French freestyle swimmer and diver. He competed at the 1920 Summer Olympics and 1924 Summer Olympics. He was murdered in the Auschwitz concentration camp during World War II.
