= Jaroslav Dvořák (weightlifter) =

Czech weightlifter (1896–?)

Personal information
- Nationality: Czech
- Born: 18 July 1896

Sport
- Sport: Weightlifting

Jaroslav Dvořák (born 18 July 1896, date of death unknown) was a Czech weightlifter. He competed in the men's light heavyweight event at the 1920 Summer Olympics.
