= Søren Petersen =

Danish boxer (1894–1945)

Olympic medal record

Men's Boxing
Silver medal – second place	1920 Antwerp	Heavyweight
Silver medal – second place	1924 Paris	Heavyweight

Søren Peter Petersen (December 6, 1894 in Kolding, Denmark – 1945 in Belgium) was a Danish heavyweight professional boxer who competed in the 1920s and 1930s. He was born in Kolding and died in Belgium. Petersen won a silver medal in boxing at the 1920 Summer Olympics, losing to British boxer Ronald Rawson in the final. Petersen was knocked down seven times in the first three rounds of the fight, at the time an Olympic record; he did not knock Rawson down a single time in the fight. Peterson followed his 1920 achievements exactly in boxing at the 1924 Summer Olympics where he won another silver when he lost to Otto von Porat in the final.
