= Albert Pettersson =

Swedish weightlifter

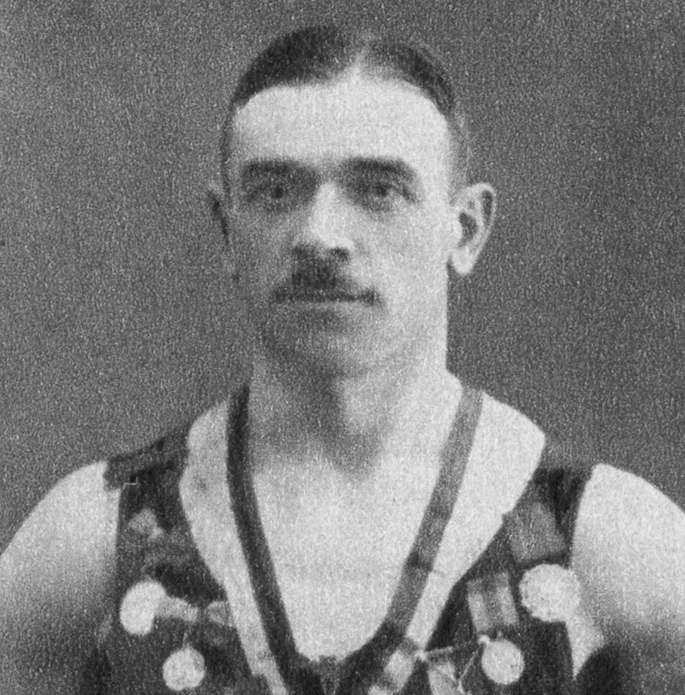

Personal information
- Born: 5 May 1885 Örebro, Sweden
- Died: 8 March 1960 (aged 74) Stockholm, Sweden

Sport
- Sport: Weightlifting
- Club: Stockholms AK
Medal record
Representing Sweden
Olympic Games
Bronze medal – third place	1920 Antwerp	Middleweight
European Championships
Bronze medal – third place	1909 Dresden	Lightweight

Erik Albert Pettersson (5 May 1885 – 8 March 1960) was a Swedish weightlifter. He won two bronze medals at international competitions: in the lightweight division at the 1909 European Championships, and in the middleweight category (−75 kg) at the 1920 Summer Olympics. Aged 35, he was the oldest weightlifting competitor at those games.
