= Maurice Davène =

French weightlifter

Personal information
- Nationality: French
- Born: 7 March 1891 Paris, France
- Died: 4 June 1969 (aged 78) Paris, France

Sport
- Sport: Weightlifting

Maurice Henri Davène (7 March 1891 – 4 June 1969) was a French weightlifter. He competed in the men's light heavyweight event at the 1920 Summer Olympics.
