= Auguste de Laissardière =

French equestrian

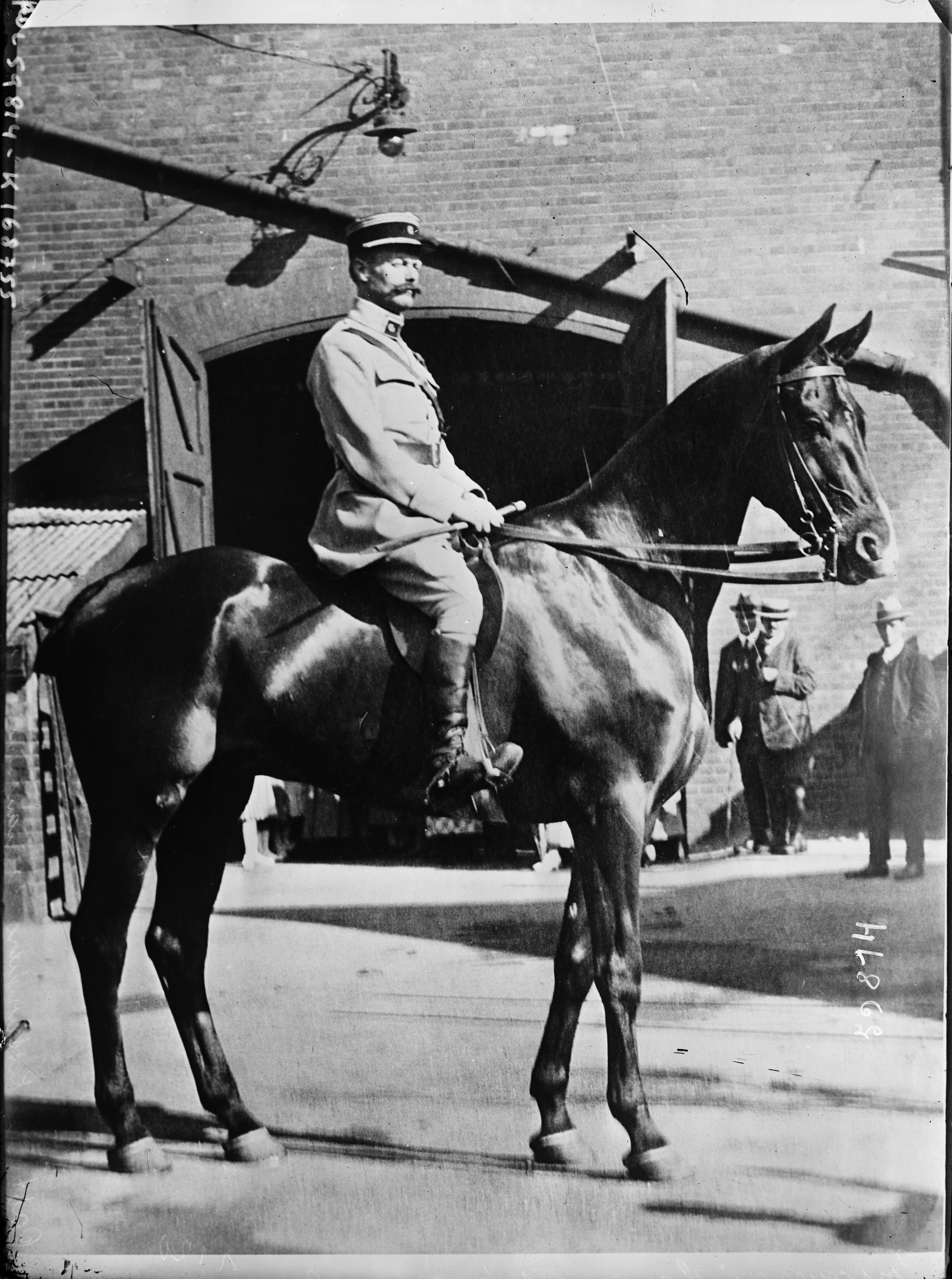
- Laissardière at the 1920 Olympia London International Horse Show.

Personal information
- Full name: Marie Auguste du Tremblay de Laissardière
- Nationality: French
- Born: 15 April 1881 Vault-de-Lugny, France
- Died: 21 June 1964 (aged 83) Paris, France

Sport
- Sport: Equestrian

Auguste de Laissardière (15 April 1881 – 21 June 1964) was a French equestrian and cavalry officer. He competed in the team jumping event at the 1920 Summer Olympics.

He fought during both World War I and World War II. Assigned to the Saumur Cavalry School in June 1940, he prevented the capture of the school's horses after the French defeat.
