= Hédoin de Maille =

French equestrian

Personal information
- Nationality: French
- Born: 15 November 1898; Tours, France
- Died: 6 April 1953 (aged 54); Lantan, France

Sport
- Sport: Equestrian

Hédoin de Maille (15 November 1898 – 6 April 1953) was a French equestrian. He competed in the individual dressage event at the 1920 Summer Olympics.
