= Henri Mehu =

French equestrian

Personal information
- Nationality: French
- Born: 13 August 1891 Saint-Laurent-sur-Saône, France
- Died: 16 March 1973 (aged 81) Caluire-et-Cuire, France

Sport
- Sport: Equestrian

Henri Mehu (13 August 1891 – 16 March 1973) was a French equestrian. He competed in the individual dressage event at the 1920 Summer Olympics.
