= Arne Tellefsen =

Norwegian modern pentathlete

Personal information
- Born: 13 February 1891 Oslo, Norway
- Died: 23 December 1973 (aged 82) Oslo, Norway

Sport
- Sport: Modern pentathlon

Arne Tellefsen (13 February 1891 – 23 December 1973) was a Norwegian modern pentathlete. He competed at the 1920 Summer Olympics.
