= Louis Bernot =

French weightlifter (1896–1975)

Medal record

Men's weightlifting

Representing France

Olympic Games
Bronze medal – third place	1920 Antwerp	Heavyweight

Louis Bernot (French: [lwi bɛʁno]; 26 July 1896 - 19 February 1975) was a French weightlifter who competed in the 1920 Summer Olympics. He won the bronze medal in the heavyweight class.
