= Henri Gance =

French weightlifter

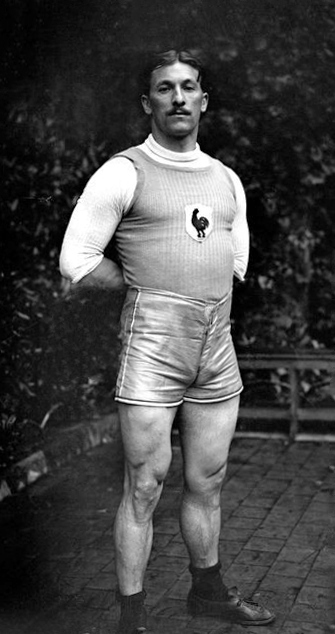

Personal information
- Born: 17 March 1888 Paris, France
- Died: 29 November 1953 (aged 65) Paris, France
- Height: 1.70 m (5 ft 7 in)
- Weight: 75 kg (165 lb)

Sport
- Sport: Weightlifting
- Club: Cercle Athlétique Parisien
Medal record
Representing France
Olympic Games
Gold medal – first place	1920 Antwerp	-75 kg

Henri Gance (17 March 1888 – 29 November 1953) was a French weightlifter who won a gold medal at the 1920 Summer Olympics in Antwerp, representing France.

Gance took up weightlifting in 1908 and was a French champion in 1920.
