= Ernest Cadine =

French weightlifter (1893–1978)

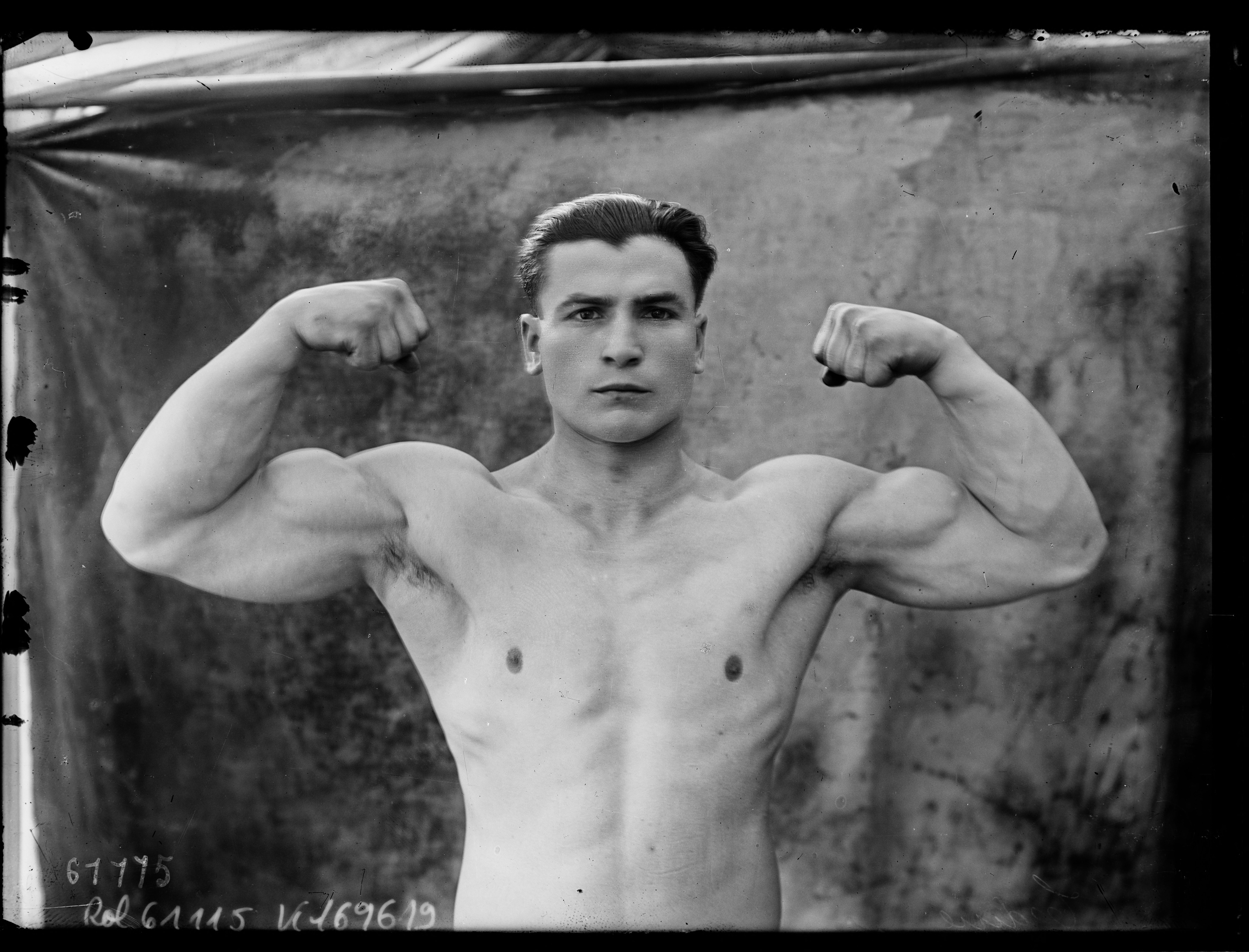
- Ernest Cadine in 1920

Personal information
- Born: 12 July 1893 Seine-Saint-Denis, France
- Died: 20 May 1978 (aged 84) Paris, France
- Height: 1.67 m (5 ft 6 in)
- Weight: 82 kg (181 lb)

Sport
- Sport: Weightlifting
Medal record
Representing France
Olympic Games
Gold medal – first place	1920 Antwerp	-82.5 kg

Ernest Cadine (12 July 1893 – 20 May 1978) was a French weightlifter who won a gold medal at the 1920 Summer Olympics in Antwerp.

As a teenager, Cadine trained in gymnastics, wrestling, weightlifting and swimming. He finished third in the national middleweight weightlifting championships before World War I. During the war, he served with an artillery regiment. In 1920, he won the light-heavyweight gold medals at the national championships and the Olympic Games and did not compete internationally thereafter. In 1920–1925, he set six world records: three in the snatch and three in clean and jerk, and later became a professional weightlifting showman. In 1978, he received the French National Order of Merit.
