= Jean Mondielli =

French modern pentathlete

Personal information
- Born: 13 September 1882
- Died: 31 May 1955 (aged 72)

Sport
- Sport: Modern pentathlon

Jean Mondielli (13 September 1882 – 31 May 1955) was a French modern pentathlete. He competed at the 1920 Summer Olympics.
