= Harold Franks =

British boxer (1891–1973)

Personal information
- Nationality: British
- Born: 2 October 1891 Hackney, London, England
- Died: 1973 Kent, England

Sport
- Sport: boxing
Medal record
Representing Great Britain
Men's boxing
Bronze medal – third place	1920 Antwerp	Light heavyweight

Harold Franks (2 October 1891 – 1973) was a British light heavyweight professional boxer who competed in the 1920s. He won a bronze medal in Boxing at the 1920 Summer Olympics losing against Norwegian boxer Sverre Sorsdal in the semi-finals.

Franks won the inaugural Amateur Boxing Association 1920 light heavyweight title, when boxing out of the St. Pancras ABC.
