= André Foucher (pentathlete) =

French modern pentathlete

Sport
- Sport: Modern pentathlon

André Foucher was a French modern pentathlete. He competed at the 1920 Summer Olympics.
