= Guillaume Candelon =

French modern pentathlete

Personal information
- Born: 19 November 1886
- Died: Unknown

Sport
- Sport: Modern pentathlon

Guillaume Candelon (born 19 November 1886, date of death unknown) was a French modern pentathlete. He competed at the 1920 Summer Olympics.
