= Xavier Eluère =

French boxer (1897–1967)

Olympic medal record

Men's Boxing
Bronze medal – third place	1920 Antwerp	Heavyweight

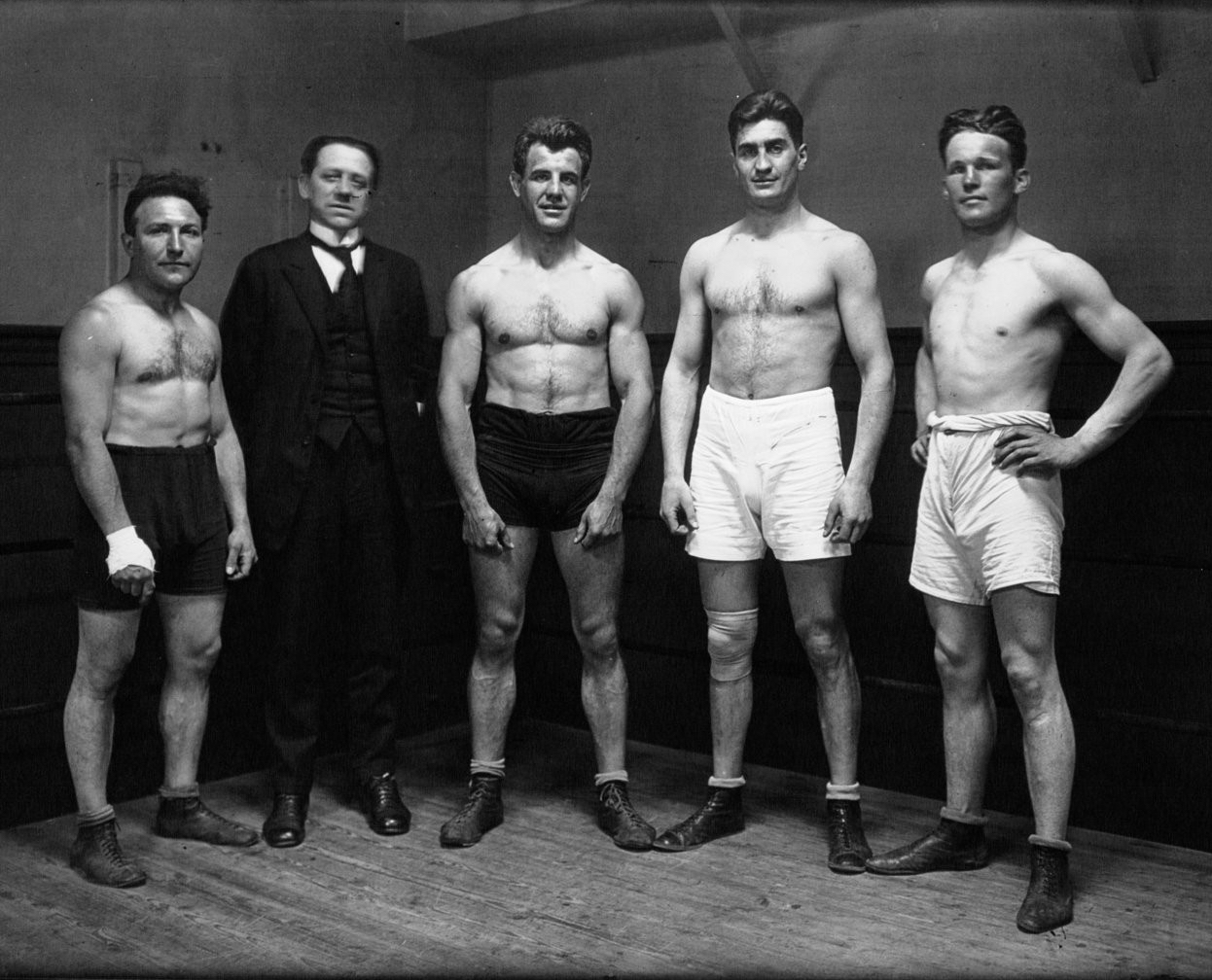
Xavier Eluère

Albert Xavier Eluère (8 September 1897 – 5 February 1967) was a French heavyweight professional boxer. He competed in the 1920s and was born in Issé. Eluère won a bronze medal in the 1920 Summer Olympics, losing against Danish boxer Søren Petersen in the semi-finals.
