= List of Olympic male artistic gymnasts for Great Britain =

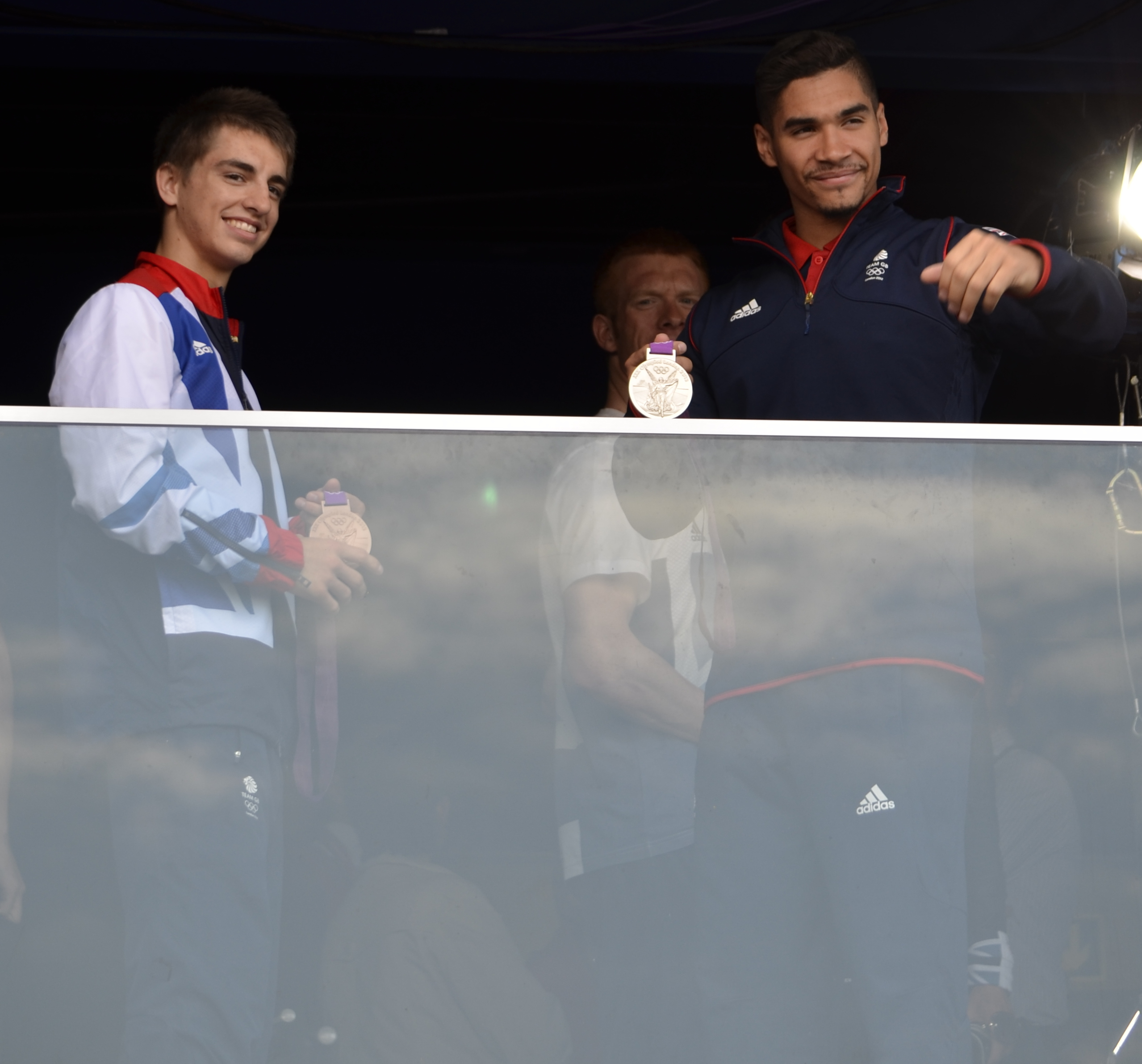
Max Whitlock and Louis Smith with their 2012 Olympic medals

British male artistic gymnasts have competed in gymnastics at the Olympic Games since its inauguration in 1896 where Launceston Elliot placed fifth in rope climbing. Walter Tysall won Great Britain its first medal in artistic gymnastics, a silver in the all-around at the 1908 Olympic Games. Max Whitlock is currently the most decorated British male Olympic gymnast with six Olympic medals, three of which are gold.

== Gymnasts ==
Gymnast	Years
Sidney Andrew	1920
Eddie Arnold	1972
Edmund Aspinall	1908
George Bailey	1908
Terry Bartlett	1984, 1988, 1992
Otto Bauscher	1908
Albert Betts	1912, 1920
Brinn Bevan	2016
Carl Beynon	1984
Michael Booth	1968
Paul Bowler	1992
Dominic Brindle	1996
Charles Brodbeck	1900
Harold Brown	1924
Ken Buffin	1948, 1952, 1960
Marvin Campbell	1992
Arthur Cocksedge	1920
William Connor	1900
Joseph Cook	1908, 1912
James Cotterell	1908, 1920
William Cowhig	1908, 1912, 1920
David Cox	1992
Bert Cronin	1928
Sidney Cross	1912, 1920
Jeff Davis	1976
Horace Dawswell	1920
Thomas Dick	1908
Harry Dickason	1912
James Dingley	1920
Sidney Domville	1908, 1920
Hedley Doncaster	1920
Herbert Drury	1908, 1912
Edgar Dyson	1908
Reginald Edgecombe	1920
Wyndham Edwards	1920
Launceston Elliot	1896
William Fergus	1908
Harry Finchett	1920, 1924, 1928
Jack Flaherty	1948
A. V. Ford	1908
Bernard Franklin	1912, 1920
Joe Fraser	2020, 2024
Dick Gradley	1960
Jamie Graham	1908
James Hall	2020
Robert Hanley	1908
Leonard Hanson	1908, 1912
Graham Harcourt	1952
J. Harris	1920
Fred Hawkins	1924
Craig Heap	2000
Harry Hepworth	2024
Henry Hiatt	1900
Alfred Hodges	1908
Samuel Hodgetts	1908, 1912, 1920
Glyn Hopkins	1948
Thomas Hopkins	1924
Stan Humphreys	1924, 1928
Jake Jarman	2024
Daniel Keatings	2008
Keith Langley	1980, 1984
Ernest Leigh	1924
Stanley Leigh	1920, 1924
Charles Luck	1912
William MacKune	1912
George Masters	1920
James May	1992
Percy May	1948
Lee McDermott	1996
Ronald McLean	1912, 1920
George Meade	1908
Alfred Messenger	1912
Andrew Morris	1984, 1988
Oliver Morris	1920
John Mulhall	1960, 1964
Ian Neale	1976
Ted Ness	1920
Bill Norgrave	1972
Henry Oberholzer	1912
Sam Oldham	2012
A.E. Page	1920
Jack Pancott	1960, 1964
Tom Parkinson	1928
William Pearce	1900
Edward Pepper	1912
William Lloyd Phillips	1900
Alfred Pinner	1920
Edward Potts	1908, 1912
Reginald Potts	1912
Teddy Pugh	1920
Daniel Purvis	2012
Gilbert Raynes	1928
Giarnni Regini-Moran	2020
George Ross	1908, 1912
Charles Simmons	1912
Charles Smith	1908
Louis Smith	2008, 2012, 2016
Arthur Southern	1912
Alfred Spencer	1924
Peter Starling	1952, 1960
Nik Stuart	1956, 1960
H.W. Taylor	1920
Kristian Thomas	2012, 2016
Neil Thomas	1992
William Titt	1908, 1912
Frank Turner	1948, 1952, 1956
Walter Tysall	1908
Eddie Van Hoof	1984
Ivor Vice	1948
Charles Vigurs	1908, 1912
Alec Wales	1948
John Walker	1920
Samuel Walker	1912
Edgar Walton	1928
Ted Warren	1928
John Watters	1908
William Watters	1908
George Weedon	1948, 1952
John Whitaker	1908, 1912
Luke Whitehouse	2024
Arthur Whitford	1928
Jack Whitford	1952
Max Whitlock	2012, 2016, 2020, 2024
Stan Wild	1968, 1972
Nile Wilson	2016
Tommy Wilson	1976, 1980
Barry Winch	1980, 1984
Ralph Yandell	1920

== Medalists ==
Medal	Name	Year	Event
Silver	Walter Tysall	(United Kingdom) 1908 London	Men's all-around
Bronze	Betts, Cowhig, Cross, Dickason, Drury, Franklin, Hanson, Hodgetts, Luck, MacKune, McLean, Messenger, Oberholzer, Pepper, Potts, Potts, Ross, Simmons, Southern, Titt, Vigurs, Walker, Whitaker	(Sweden) 1912 Stockholm	Men's team
Bronze	Louis Smith	(China) 2008 Beijing	Men's pommel horse
Bronze	Oldham, Purvis, Smith, Thomas, Whitlock	(United Kingdom) 2012 London	Men's team
Silver	Louis Smith	(United Kingdom) 2012 London	Men's pommel horse
Bronze	Max Whitlock	(United Kingdom) 2012 London	Men's pommel horse
Bronze	Max Whitlock	(Brazil) 2016 Rio de Janeiro	Men's all-around
Gold	Max Whitlock	(Brazil) 2016 Rio de Janeiro	Men's floor exercise
Gold	Max Whitlock	(Brazil) 2016 Rio de Janeiro	Men's pommel horse
Silver	Louis Smith	(Brazil) 2016 Rio de Janeiro	Men's pommel horse
Bronze	Nile Wilson	(Brazil) 2016 Rio de Janeiro	Men's horizontal bar
Gold	Max Whitlock	(Japan) 2020 Tokyo	Men's pommel horse
Bronze	Jake Jarman	(France) 2024 Paris	Men's floor exercise
Bronze	Harry Hepworth	(France) 2024 Paris	Men's vault

== See also ==
- Great Britain men's national artistic gymnastics team
- List of Olympic female artistic gymnasts for Great Britain
