= Welsh Gymnastics =

Governing body of gymnastics in Wales

- Gymnasteg Cymru
- Abbreviation: WG
- Formation: 1902; 124 years ago
- Type: National sports governing body
- Purpose: Developing gymnasts, coaches and gymnastics clubs in Wales
- Headquarters: Sport Wales National Centre
- Location: Cardiff, Wales
- Chairman: Chris McLarnon
- CEO: Victoria Ward
- Head of MAG: Peter Etherington
- Head of WAG: Tracey Skirton-Davies
- Affiliations: British Gymnastics; European Union of Gymnastics; FIG, British Olympic Association
- Website: Welsh Gymnastics
- Formerly called: Welsh Amateur Gymnastics Association

Welsh Gymnastics (WG; Welsh: Gymnasteg Cymru) is the national governing body for gymnastics in Wales. It has overall responsibility for the administration of all eight gymnastics disciplines in Wales – women's artistic, men's artistic and rhythmic gymnastics, general gymnastics, sports acrobatics, sports aerobics, trampolining and tumbling – through its four geographical areas (north, south, east and west), which are responsible for their own area competition and squad training sessions.

== History ==
Welsh Gymnastics was founded in 1902 as the Welsh Amateur Gymnastics Association (WAGA) which catered for men's and women's artistic gymnastics.

In 1912 Welsh gymnasts William Cowhig and William Titt were part of the British team that won bronze in the team event at the 1912 Olympic Games in Sweden. They are the only Welsh gymnasts to win an Olympic medal to date.

Welsh Gymnastics first competed at the Commonwealth Games in 1978 after gymnastics was included in the Games programme. The gymnasts who were the first to represent Wales at these Commonwealth Games in Canada were: Andrew Hallam, Leigh Jones, Michael Higgins, Paul Preedy, Tina Pocock, Jacqueline Vokes, Linda Bernard and Linda Surringer.

Women's artistic gymnast Sonia Lawrence won silver on the vault at the 1994 Commonwealth Games in Victoria, Canada to become the first gymnast to win a Commonwealth medal for Wales.

In 2004 the organisation changed to Welsh Gymnastics (WG) dropping the amateur status and becoming a company limited by guarantee.

Welsh Gymnastics relocated from their previous headquarters at Cardiff Central Youth Club to Sport Wales National Centre at Sophia Gardens in Cardiff in 2010.

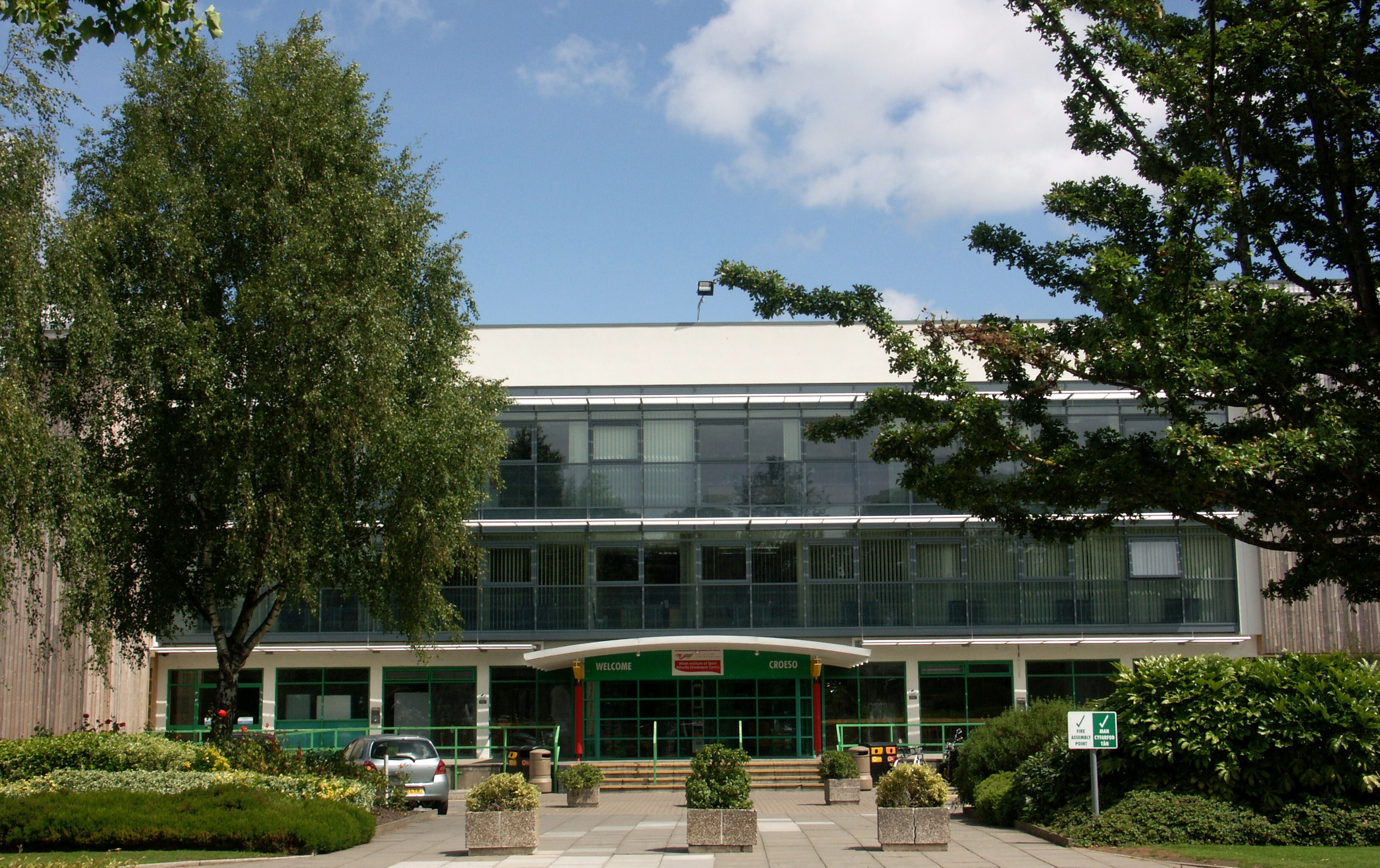
Sport Wales National Centre, Cardiff home of Welsh Gymnastics

In 2014 Welsh gymnasts won a historic 10 medals at the 2014 Commonwealth Games in Glasgow. Becoming their most successful Commonwealth Games to date. Rhythmic gymnast Frankie Jones led the way with six medals (five individual, one team).

Helen Phillips MBE stepped down as chair in 2019 after an 18-year tenure.

Chris McLarnon becomes chair in 2024.

At the 2026 Commonwealth Games twin sisters Abigail and Emily Roper made history by becoming the first medalist on vault since 1994 and first ever commonwealth medalist on the uneven bars respectively. The following day Ruby Evans became the first artistic gymnast to win a gold medal at the Commonwealth Games, after placing first on floor exercise.

== Competition ==
Welsh Gymnastics organises the Welsh national team for international competition including the Commonwealth Games & Northern European Gymnastics Championships.

It also hosts national competitions including the Welsh Gymnastics Championships annually for elite-level artistic gymnasts which is a qualifying event for the British Gymnastics Championships which subsequently acts a selection event for the British Gymnastics national team.
