= Stan Wild =

British gymnast (born 1944)

- Full name: Stanley John Wild
- Born: 19 February 1944 (age 82) Bolton upon Dearne, England

Gymnastics career
- Discipline: Men's artistic gymnastics
- Country represented: (United Kingdom) Great Britain
- Club: Leeds Athletic Institute
- Head coach: Dick Gradley

Stanley John Wild (born 19 February 1944) is a British gymnast. He competed at the 1968 Summer Olympics and the 1972 Summer Olympics.

In 2021, following an investigation into multiple allegations of child sexual abuse, Wild was expelled from British Gymnastics.
