= Cowhig =

Cowhig is an Irish surname found primarily in County Cork, Ireland. Notable people with the surname include:

- Gerry Cowhig (1921–1996), American football player
- William Cowhig (1887–1964), British Olympic gymnast
