= George Weedon =

George Weedon may refer to:

- George Weedon (general) (1734–1793), American general
- George Weedon (gymnast) (1920–2017), English gymnast
