= Alex Buesnel =

British artistic gymnast, also competing for Jersey

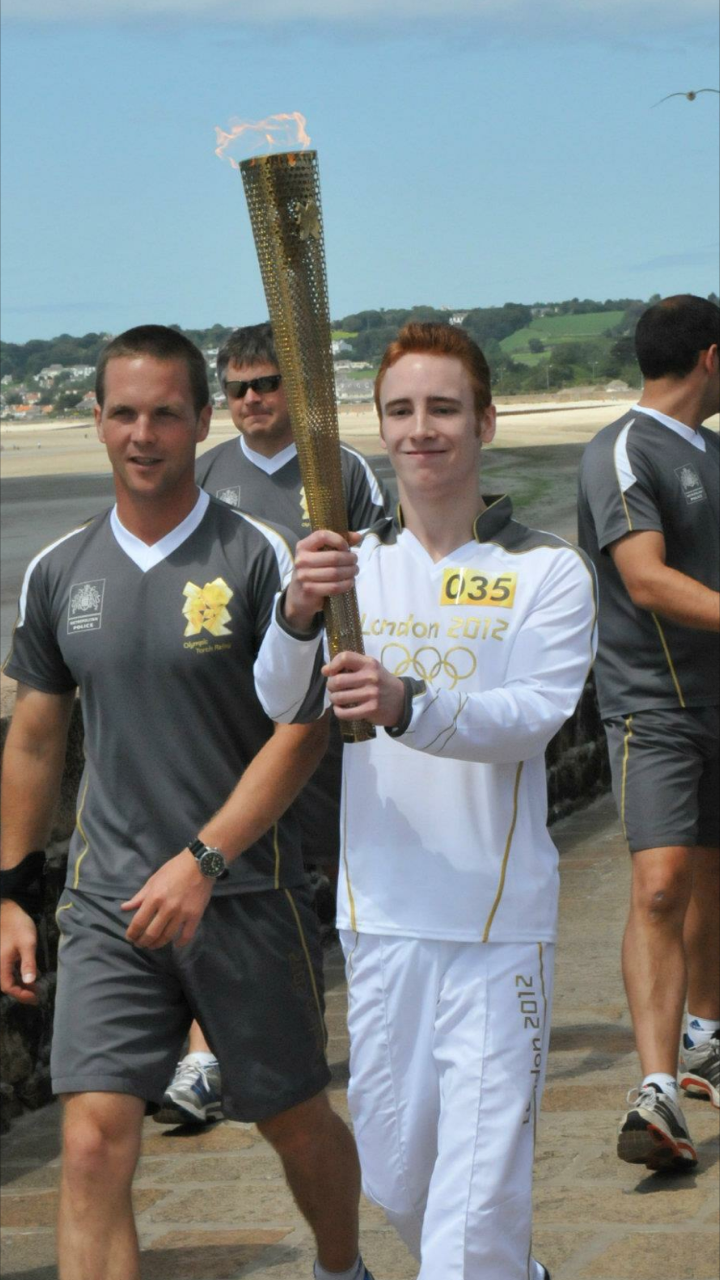
- Buesnel carrying the Olympic Flame in 2012

Personal information
- Full name: Alexander Thomas Harry Buesnel
- Born: 8 October 1992 (age 34) Jersey, Channel Islands

Gymnastics career
- Discipline: Men's artistic gymnastics
- Country represented: (United Kingdom) Great Britain; Jersey
- Club: Jersey Special Gymnastics Club
Medal record
Men's artistic gymnastics
Representing Great Britain
Special Olympics World Games
Gold medal – first place	2011 Athens	Floor
Silver medal – second place	2011 Athens	Rings
Silver medal – second place	2011 Athens	Parallel Bars
Silver medal – second place	2011 Athens	Horizontal Bar
Bronze medal – third place	2011 Athens	Pommel Horse
Bronze medal – third place	2011 Athens	Vault
Bronze medal – third place	2011 Athens	All-Around
Special Olympics European Games
Gold medal – first place	2014 Belgium	Floor
Gold medal – first place	2014 Belgium	Pommel Horse
Gold medal – first place	2014 Belgium	Rings
Silver medal – second place	2014 Belgium	Parallel Bars
Silver medal – second place	2014 Belgium	Horizontal Bar
Silver medal – second place	2014 Belgium	All-Around
Bronze medal – third place	2014 Belgium	Vault
Representing Jersey
British Open Champion
Gold medal – first place	2017 Lilleshall	Champion
Gold medal – first place	2016 Lilleshall	Champion
Gold medal – first place	2015 Bolton	Champion
Gold medal – first place	2014 Lilleshall	Champion
Gold medal – first place	2013 Newcastle	Champion
Gold medal – first place	2012 Newcastle	Champion
Gold medal – first place	2011 Poole	Champion
Gold medal – first place	2010 Newcastle	Champion
Gold medal – first place	2009 Newcastle	Champion
Gold medal – first place	2008 London	Champion
Natwest Island Games
Silver medal – second place	2017 Gotland	Team SET
Special Olympics National Games
Gold medal – first place	2017 Sheffield	All-Around
Gold medal – first place	2013 Bath	All-Around
Gold medal – first place	2009 Leicester	All-Around

Alexander Thomas Harry Buesnel (born 8 October 1992) is a British artistic gymnast. He is a ten-time British Disability Gymnastics Champion as well as a gold medalist in the 2011 Special Olympics World Summer Games in Athens, Greece. He was born in Jersey, Channel Islands, and started his gymnastics career in 2004 under the Jersey Special Gymnastics Club founder John Grady MBE. During his career, Buesnel competed in competitions across the globe representing both Jersey and Great Britain in National, European and World championships.

== Early life ==
Alexander Thomas Harry Buesnel was born in Saint Helier, Jersey on 8 October 1992. Buesnel is autistic. He was introduced to gymnastics in September 2004 when he joined the Jersey Special Gymnastics Club aged 11. In 2005, he competed in his first mainland competition in Poole, where he won three gold medals at Level 1 and a further gold on vault at Level 2. He repeated his achievements in 2006 and 2007, taking three gold medals at both Level 2 and 3 in the next two consecutive years. Progressing through the set levels, Buesnel moved up to Level 4 (the highest tier) in 2008.

In 2007, he won the Alan Kelly Memorial Trophy for achievement in Special Gymnastics in Jersey. He won the award again ten years later, in December 2017.

== Gymnastics career ==
=== 2008 ===
In August 2008, Buesnel was selected for the Great Britain team. He moved up to Level 4, the highest level of Special Gymnastics. In November, Buesnel won his first British Open title in London, becoming the first Jersey Special Gymnast to do so.

Shortly after his first title, Buesnel was invited to his first event outside the British Isles: the Blume Festival in Gran Canaria. This trip included training camps, displays and a friendly competition at the end of the week-long experience.

=== 2009 ===
A busy second year at senior level for Buesnel saw him contest his first Special Olympics National Games in Leicester. Five gold and one silver medal and a fourth place on horizontal bar earned him the all-around gold medal. This was followed by his second British Open title, secured in Newcastle.

Buesnel travelled to Berlin, Germany for his second international training camp with the Great Britain squad.

=== 2010 ===
Buesnel continued his gymnastics career and began foundation coaching as part of his Sport course at Highlands College.

=== 2011 ===
As well as winning his fourth British title in Poole, Buesnel was named to the Great Britain squad for the upcoming Special Olympics World Games. He won a gold medal on floor as well as silver on the rings, parallel bars, and horizontal bar and bronze on vault, resulting in an overall all-around bronze medal at his first Special Olympics.

Away from competition, Buesnel became a coach, passing his Level 1 Coaching assessment in November 2011.

=== 2012 ===
Buesnel was selected as one of 20 torch carriers when he took part in the London 2012 Olympic torch relay in St Helier, Jersey in July 2012.

In November, Buesnel claimed his fifth straight British Open title. A week later, Buesnel was awarded the Jersey Sports Association For The Disabled (JSAD) Sports Personality of the Year.

=== 2013 ===
In his second Special Olympics National Games in Bath, Buesnel won six gold and one silver medal, allowing him to claim the all-around gold. Buesnel was also awarded another gold medal in a special gala event to close the competition.

=== 2014 ===
Buesnel contested his first Special Olympics European Games in Antwerp, Belgium. Before the competition, Buesnel, along with his fellow athletes, enjoyed a special reception with Prime Minister David Cameron. At the competition, Buesnel claimed three golds, three silvers, and a bronze, winning him the all-around gold.

As well as his European success, Buesnel excelled in Britain. In March 2014, Disability Gymnasts' profile was raised when the sport was run alongside the British Gymnastics Championships at Echo Arena in Liverpool. Buesnel won the Disability all-around gold while sharing the arena with Olympians, including Louis Smith and Dan Keatings.

=== 2015 ===
In March 2015, Buesnel competed in his second British Masters competition at the Echo Arena in Liverpool, claiming two gold and four silver medals. Buesnel's domination of the British Open Championship also continued with a gold in the all-around on his way to his eighth straight British title; he won on all pieces of apparatus.

Later that year, he competed at the mainstream Inter Island Games in Anglesey, Wales. He won two silver medals and a bronze for Jersey.

=== 2016 ===
As well as his ninth British Open success, 2016 saw Buesnel become an ambassador for British Gymnastics, the governing body for gymnastics in the United Kingdom. He also passed his Level 2 Coaching assessment.

=== 2017 ===
In the summer of 2017, Buesnel contested his third Special Olympics National Games in Sheffield and won seven gold medals. Buesnel was chosen to perform his horizontal bar routine at a special gala performance to close the competition.

Buesnel was selected for the 13-strong squad to represent Jersey in the Natwest Island Games in Gotland in June. He was the first disabled athlete to represent the island in the biennial games. As well as helping the team collect silver, Buesnel also qualified for two apparatus finals.

In September, Buesnel was shortlisted as finalist for the Jersey Evening Post Pride of Jersey Awards.

In October, Buesnel won his tenth consecutive British Open Championship title. He also was awarded the JSAD Sports Personality of the Year for the second time.

=== 2018 ===
At the beginning of 2018, Buesnel was recognised for his services to gymnastics in the Channel Islands and was awarded the Michael Lucas Sporting Hero Award at the Betway Channel Islands Sports Personality Awards in Guernsey.

In March, Buesnel made the shortlist for the 2017 Jersey Sports Council Sports Personality of the Year. After missing out on the main trophy, he won an award for achievement in Disability sport. That same month, Buesnel competed in his final competition, the British Masters competition at the Echo Arena in Liverpool. He finished with three gold and two silver medals.

On 20 March 2018, Buesnel announced his retirement from competitive gymnastics after 14 years in the sport. He said he would continue to train and would focus on his coaching career.

== Awards and honours ==
- 10-time British Open Gymnastics Champion
- Special Olympics Gold Medalist
- British Gymnastics Ambassador
- JSAD Sports Personality of the Year (2012 and 2017)
- JSAD Special Merit Award (2009 and 2016)
- Michael Lucas Sporting Hero Award - Channel Islands Sports Personality Awards 2017
