= Gymnastics at the 1912 Summer Olympics – Men's artistic individual all-around =

Olympic gymnastics event

Men's artistic individual all-around at the Games of the V Olympiad
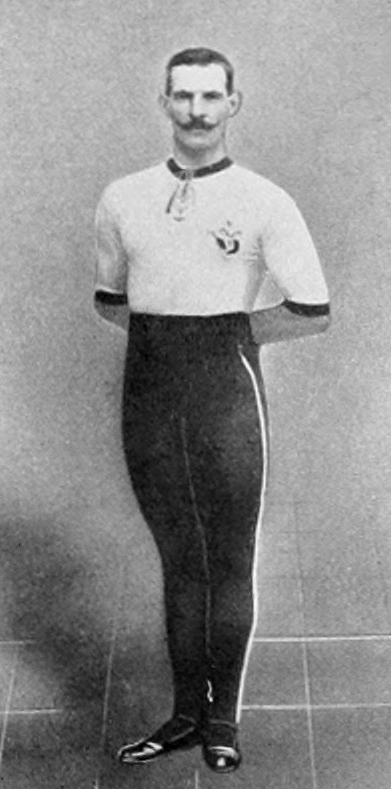
- Gold medalist Alberto Braglia
- Venue: Stockholm Olympic Stadium
- Date: 12 July 1912
- Competitors: 44 from 9 nations
- Winning score: 131.50

Medalists
1st place, gold medalist(s)		Alberto Braglia; Italy
2nd place, silver medalist(s)		Louis Ségura; France
3rd place, bronze medalist(s)		Adolfo Tunesi; Italy

The men's artistic individual all-around was an artistic gymnastics event held as part of the Gymnastics at the 1912 Summer Olympics programme. The competition was held on 12 July at the Stockholm Olympic Stadium. It was the fourth appearance of the event. There were 44 competitors from 9 nations. Each nation was limited to 6 gymnasts (a marked reduction from the 20 permitted in 1908). The event was won by Alberto Braglia of Italy, the first man to successfully defend a title in the artistic individual all-around. The bronze medalist from 1908, Louis Ségura, this time took silver. Braglia and Ségura were the first two men to win multiple medals in the event. Italian Adolfo Tunesi earned bronze.

As in 1908, the individual results were not considered for any of the team competitions. As in 1900 and 1908, there were no separate apparatus events.

== Background ==
This was the fourth appearance of the men's individual all-around. The first individual all-around competition had been held in 1900, after the 1896 competitions featured only individual apparatus events. A men's individual all-around has been held every Games since 1900.

Four of the top 10 gymnasts from the 1908 Games returned: gold medalist Alberto Braglia of Italy, bronze medalist Louis Ségura of France, sixth-place finisher Samuel Hodgetts of Great Britain, and seventh-place finisher Marcel Lalu of France. Marco Torrès of France (1909) had won a World Championship since the last Games; reigning (1911) World Champion Ferdinand Steiner of Bohemia did not compete in Stockholm.

Denmark, Luxembourg, and the Russian Empire each made their debut in the event. Bohemia, France, Great Britain, Hungary, and Italy each made their third appearance, tying the absent Germany (missing the event for the first time) for most among nations. Germany, Sweden, and Norway had gymnasts competing in the team events, but opted not to have individual gymnasts; Sweden and Norway cited their view that gymnastics should be a team sport with mass displays.

== Competition format ==
Gymnasts competed on the horizontal bar, parallel bars, rings, and pommel horse. Three judges marked each performer in each of the four apparati; these 12 scores were summed to give a final score. The scoring was from 0 to 12; this led to a possible total of 36 on each apparatus and 144 for the grand total.

== Schedule ==
Two three-hour sessions were held on a single day, from 9:30 to 12:30 and from 14:00 to 17:00.

Date	Time	Round
Friday, 12 July 1912	9:30	Final

== Results ==
Results are listed in the order that they appeared in the Official Olympic Report, rather than the Olympic Order that exists today.

Rank	Gymnast	Nation	Pommel horse	Rings (gymnastics)	Parallel bars	Horizontal bar	Total
1st place, gold medalist(s)	Alberto Braglia	Italy	34.75	31.75	34.75	32.75	135.00
2nd place, silver medalist(s)	Louis Ségura	France	34.50	32.25	35.75	30.00	132.50
3rd place, bronze medalist(s)	Adolfo Tunesi	Italy	35.75	30.50	35.00	30.25	131.50
4	Guido Boni	Italy	34.75	28.25	35.25	29.75	128.00
4	Giorgio Zampori	Italy	33.25	30.75	35.00	29.00	128.00
6	Pietro Bianchi	Italy	31.75	30.75	33.75	29.50	127.75
7	Marcel Lalu	France	31.75	30.50	35.50	29.25	127.00
7	Marco Torrès	France	30.75	31.00	35.00	30.25	127.00
9	Guido Romano	Italy	34.50	30.00	32.50	29.25	126.25
10	Antoine Costa	France	30.75	29.75	34.25	29.75	124.50
11	Louis-Charles Marty	France	30.50	30.50	34.75	26.75	122.50
12	Leonard Hanson	Great Britain	29.50	31.50	31.75	28.50	121.25
13	Elemér Pászti	Hungary	33.75	27.00	30.50	27.75	119.00
14	Auguste Pompogne	France	31.00	28.00	32.00	27.00	118.00
15	József Szalai	Hungary	26.00	29.75	33.00	28.00	117.25
15	Antoine Wehrer	Luxembourg	29.00	28.75	33.00	26.50	117.25
17	Imre Gellért	Hungary	32.25	26.75	34.00	24.00	117.00
18	Pierre Hentges	Luxembourg	30.75	29.25	29.50	26.00	115.50
19	János Krizmanich	Hungary	33.00	26.75	28.75	26.50	115.00
20	Nicolas Kanivé	Luxembourg	28.50	29.50	31.25	22.25	111.50
21	John Whitaker	Great Britain	27.25	29.75	27.75	26.50	111.25
22	Jean-Pierre Thommes	Luxembourg	28.50	27.50	32.00	22.75	110.75
23	François Hentges	Luxembourg	30.25	27.00	32.50	20.75	110.50
24	Emile Lanners	Luxembourg	28.75	27.00	29.00	25.00	109.75
25	Samuel Hodgetts	Great Britain	27.25	28.25	27.75	25.25	108.50
26	Arvor Hansen	Denmark	22.50	28.50	29.50	27.00	107.50
27	Villiam Nieminen	Finland	24.25	25.00	30.00	26.50	105.75
28	Charles Simmons	Great Britain	23.00	28.50	30.50	23.50	105.50
29	William Cowhig	Great Britain	22.50	26.75	29.50	25.75	104.50
30	Charles Jensen	Denmark	25.25	26.25	27.00	25.25	103.75
31	Edvard Jansson	Finland	19.75	24.25	30.75	28.25	103.00
32	Reginald Potts	Great Britain	24.75	28.25	23.25	25.50	101.75
33	Axel Andersen	Denmark	20.00	26.50	30.00	22.25	98.75
34	Carl Pedersen	Denmark	20.00	28.25	28.25	20.75	97.25
34	Niels Petersen	Denmark	23.75	25.50	25.00	17.00	97.25
36	Bohumil Honzátko	Bohemia	23.75	25.50	25.00	17.00	91.25
37	Anders Tamminen	Finland	18.25	26.00	23.25	23.00	90.50
38	Pavel Kushnikov	Russian Empire	19.25	21.50	24.50	24.75	90.00
39	Aleksandr Akhyun	Russian Empire	18.50	23.25	25.25	20.75	87.75
40	Einar Møbius	Denmark	20.00	26.25	27.00	13.50	86.75
41	Semyon Kulikov	Russian Empire	17.50	21.50	24.00	16.50	79.50
42	Fyodor Zabelin	Russian Empire	17.00	22.50	22.00	14.75	76.25
—	Yrjö Vuolio	Finland	—	—	29.00	23.25	52.25
—	Kaarlo Ekholm	Finland	—	—	25.50	25.00	50.50

== Sources ==
- The Official Report of the Olympic Games of Stockholm 1912. Stockholm: Wahlström & Widstrand. 1913. (pp 558–559)
- Wudarski, Pawel (1999). "Wyniki Igrzysk Olimpijskich" (in Polish).
