= Junior World Artistic Gymnastics Championships – Boys' vault =

The Junior World Championships in artistic gymnastics were first held in 2019. Originally meant to be held every two years, the second edition of the event was not held until 2023 due to the COVID-19 pandemic.

Three medals are awarded: gold for first place, silver for second place, and bronze for third place. Tie breakers were used in the first year of the event but were not used subsequently.

== Medalists ==
Year	Location	Gold	Silver	Bronze	Ref
2019	(Hungary) Győr	(Hungary) Gabriel Burtănete	(China) Yang Haonan	(United Kingdom) Jasper Smith-Gordon	
2023	(Turkey) Antalya	(Italy) Tommaso Brugnami	(Canada) Victor Canuel	(Hungary) Szilard Zavory	
2025	(Philippines) Manila	(Individual Neutral Athletes) Arsenii Dukhno	(United Kingdom) Sol Scott	(United Kingdom) Evan McPhillips	

== All-time medal count ==
Last updated after the 2025 Junior World Championships.

Rank	Nation	Gold	Silver	Bronze	Total
1	Hungary	1	0	1	2
2	Italy	1	0	0	1
–	Individual Neutral Athletes	1	0	0	1
3	Great Britain	0	1	2	3
4	Canada	0	1	0	1
4	China	0	1	0	1
Totals (5 entries)		3	3	3	9
