= Para-gymnastics =

Gymnastics for disabled athletes

- Highest governing body: World Gymnastics

Characteristics
- Contact: No contact
- Mixed-sex: No, separate
- Venue: Gymnasium

Presence
- Paralympic: No

Para-gymnastics, also known as disability gymnastics and para gymnastics, is a discipline of gymnastics for disabled athletes. It was recognized as an official World Gymnastics discipline in October 2024.

== History ==
World Gymnastics maintained a Gymnastics for All committee. In 2018, they expanded the Gymnastics for All program by forming an alliance of gymnastics federations. Countries such as the United States have held team competitions teams of athletes with disabilities, while countries like Great Britain have held championships for individual competitors.

In October 2024, World Gymnastics recognized para-gymnastics as an official discipline. It defined the discipline as "Competitive Gymnastics performed on different pieces of apparatus for those gymnasts with approved Para classification," and approved it for artistic gymnastics. As of 2024, para-gymnastics is limited to national competition.

World Gymnastics published its first Codes of Points for men's and women's artistic para-gymnastics in November 2026. It defined three levels of competition structure, with gymnasts allowed to compete different levels on different apparatus as needed by their impairment, and it focused on three groups of disabilities: upper limb impairment, lower limb impairment, and visual impairment. The Codes were acknowledged to be preliminary, with the first year of use expected to inform further refinement.

=== Great Britain ===
Great Britain had a national para-gymnastics squad, but it disbanded in 2013. In 2016, more than 200 clubs affiliated with British Gymnastics officially offered disability gymnastics programs, representing over 1,500 disabled members. In 2020, British Gymnastics officially formed the British Gymnastics Disability Gymnastics Panel. British Gymnastics worked on a Code of Points for Men's and Women's Artistic Para-Gymnastics, and on creating a classification structure, with the goals of hosting the first World Gymnastics Para-Gymnastics World Championships in 2027 and Paralympic inclusion in 2032.

== Notable para-gymnasts ==
- Jen Bricker-Bauer
- Alex Buesnel
- Carol Johnston
- Stacie Ridley
- Oli Kettleborough
