= Auguste Pompogne =

French gymnast

- Born: 5 December 1882

Gymnastics career
- Discipline: Men's artistic gymnastics
- Country represented: France

Auguste Pompogne (born 5 December 1882; date of death unknown) was a French gymnast who competed in the 1912 Summer Olympics. In 1912 he finished 14th in the all-around competition.
