= Adolfo Tunesi =

Italian artistic gymnast

- Born: 27 August 1887 Cento, Kingdom of Italy
- Died: 29 November 1964 (aged 77) Bologna, Italy

Gymnastics career
- Discipline: Men's artistic gymnastics
- Country represented: Italy
- Club: Virtus Pallacanestro Bologna
Medal record
Men's artistic gymnastics
Representing Kingdom of Italy
Olympic Games
Gold medal – first place	1912 Stockholm	Team
Bronze medal – third place	1912 Stockholm	All-around

Adolfo Tunesi (August 27, 1887 – November 29, 1964) was an Italian gymnast who competed in the 1912 Summer Olympics. As part of the Italian team he won the gold medal in the gymnastics men's team, European system event as well as the bronze medal in the individual all-around.
