= Karl Richter (gymnast) =

German gymnast

- Full name: Karl Walter Richter
- Born: 23 September 1887 Leipzig, German Empire
- Died: 3 October 1918 (aged 31) Leipzig, German Empire

Gymnastics career
- Discipline: Men's artistic gymnastics
- Country represented: Germany
- Gym: Allgemeiner Akademischer Turnerbund Leipzig

Karl Walter Richter (September 23, 1887 – October 3, 1918) was a German gymnast who competed in the 1912 Summer Olympics. He was born in Leipzig. In 1912, he was a member of the German team that finished fourth in the team, free system competition and fifth in the team, European system event.
