= Dominic Brindle =

British gymnast (born 1976)

- Born: 30 June 1976 (age 50) Bradford, England

Gymnastics career
- Discipline: Men's artistic gymnastics
- Country represented: (United Kingdom) Great Britain

Dominic Brindle (born 30 June 1976) is a British former gymnast. He competed at the 1996 Summer Olympics.
