= Pat Evans (gymnast) =

Welsh gymnast (1926–2020)

Personal information
- Nationality: Welsh
- Born: 1926 Swansea, Wales
- Died: 19 January 2020 (aged 93–94)
- Spouse: Jack Whitford

Sport
- Sport: Gymnastics

Patricia Bowen Evans Whitford (1926 – 19 January 2020) was a Welsh gymnast. She competed in the women's artistic team all-around at the 1948 Summer Olympics.
