= Karl Jordan (zoologist, born 1888) =

German gymnast

- Full name: Karl Hermann Christian Jordan
- Born: 23 March 1888 Papstdorf, German Empire
- Died: 6 March 1972 (aged 83) Bautzen, East Germany

Gymnastics career
- Discipline: Men's artistic gymnastics
- Country represented: Germany
- Gym: Allgemeiner Akademischer Turnerbund Leipzig

Karl Hermann Christian Jordan (23 March 1888 – 6 March 1972) was a German entomologist and gymnast who competed in the 1912 Summer Olympics.

== Biography ==
Jordan was born on 23 March 1888 in Papstdorf (then known as Pfaffdorf), Saxony. In 1912, he was a member of the German team that finished fourth in the team, free system competition and fifth in the team, European system event. Jordan was also a professor of zoology, with six species of heteroptera named after him.

Jordan was born to a farming family in Papstdorf, a farming village in Sächsische Schweiz-Osterzgebirge, Germany. He studied science in Jena and Leipzig. His initial career as a scientist at the experimental station for fruit and wine research, Neustadt/Haardt, was cut short by the First World War, after which he taught in the faculty of biology and chemistry at the Oberrealschule in Bautzen. In 1948/1949, he took up a position in Dresden, first as a professor of zoology and then as director of the zoological institute at the Royal Saxon Academy of Forestry in Tharandt. He led the Naturwissenschaftliche Gesellschaft ISIS Dresden for 22 years, and was editor of its publication, Isis Budissina. After the Second World War, he led the entomological section of the Deutsche Kuturbund. He is particularly known for his work on the Heteroptera but published widely on the insects of Saxony and Upper Lusatia (Oberlausitz). His own collection was later taken into the Natural History Museum, Berlin.
