= János Krizmanich =

Hungarian gymnast (1889–1944)

- Born: 27 January 1889 Sopron, Hungary
- Died: 26 July 1944 (aged 55) Budapest, Hungary

Gymnastics career
- Discipline: Men's artistic gymnastics
- Country represented: Hungary
Medal record
Olympic Games
Silver medal – second place	1912 Stockholm	Team, european system

János Krizmanich (27 January 1889 – 26 July 1944) was a Hungarian gymnast who competed in the 1912 Summer Olympics. He was part of the Hungarian team, which won the silver medal in the gymnastics men's team, European system event in 1912. In the individual all-around competition, he finished 19th.
