= Pierre Hentges =

Luxembourgish gymnast (1890–1975)

- Born: 3 September 1890 Bonnevoie, Luxembourg
- Died: 26 December 1975 (aged 85) Luxembourg City, Luxembourg
- Relatives: François Hentges (brother)

Gymnastics career
- Discipline: Men's artistic gymnastics
- Country represented: Luxembourg

Pierre Hentges (3 September 1890 – 26 December 1975) was a Luxembourgish gymnast who competed in the 1912 Summer Olympics. In 1912 he was a member of the Luxembourgish team which finished fourth in the team, European system competition and fifth in the team, free system event. In the individual all-around, he finished 18th.
