= Rudolf Körner =

German gymnast (1892–1978)

- Full name: Theodor Rudolph Körner
- Born: 8 January 1892 Leipzig, German Empire
- Died: 13 November 1978 (aged 86) Füssen, West Germany

Gymnastics career
- Discipline: Men's artistic gymnastics
- Country represented: Germany
- Gym: Allgemeiner Akademischer Turnerbund Leipzig

Theodor Rudolph "Rudolf" Körner (8 January 1892 – 13 November 1978) was a German gymnast who competed in the 1912 Summer Olympics. In 1912, Körner was a member of the German team which finished fourth in the team, free system competition and fifth in the team, European system event.

In Leipzig, he studied biology, chemistry, geology, history, and sports to become a teacher. He was a member of the Frankfurt-Leipziger Burschenschaft Arminia. He fought as an officer in both World Wars and was awarded high medals of honour.
