= Elemér Pászti =

Hungarian gymnast (1889–1965)

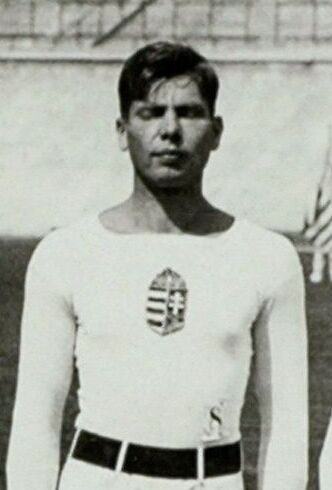
- Elemér Pászti in 1928

Personal information
- Born: 20 December 1889 Szolnok
- Died: 27 October 1965 (aged 75) Budapest

Gymnastics career
- Discipline: Men's artistic gymnastics
- Country represented: Hungary
Medal record
Olympic Games
Silver medal – second place	1912 Stockholm	Team, european system

Elemér Pászti (born 20 December 1889 in Szolnok – 27 October 1965 in Budapest) was a Hungarian gymnast who competed at the 1912 Summer Olympics and the 1928 Summer Olympics.

He was part of the Hungarian team, which won the silver medal in the gymnastics men's team European system event in 1912. In the individual all-around competition he finished 13th.
