= Frank Turner (gymnast) =

British gymnast

- Turner as captain of the British Gymnastics team in 1948

Personal information
- Full name: Frank Conway Turner
- Born: 5 September 1922
- Died: 27 September 2010 (aged 88) Bricket Wood, England

Gymnastics career
- Discipline: Men's artistic gymnastics
- Country represented: (United Kingdom) Great Britain

Frank Conway Turner (5 November 1922 – 27 September 2010) was a British gymnast who took part in four Olympic Games, three as a competitor and the fourth as National Coach; he was captain of the British Gymnastics team in the 1948 Summer Olympics. Turner was four times British gymnastics champion.

== Early life and education ==
Born in the East End of London in 1922, Turner developed an interest in sports as a boy, training in table tennis, diving, football, boxing and gymnastics. As a flyweight, Turner boxed in the semi-finals of the Amateur Boxing Association of England Championship before deciding to develop his interest in gymnastics. Aged 11, he won the South of England Boys Championship in 1933 before making his international debut aged 15 in 1938. On leaving school in 1939, he worked as a bank clerk, but during World War II he was conscripted into the Royal Artillery in 1941. He served in North Africa and Sicily and was twice wounded.

== Gymnastics career ==
On being selected to captain the British gymnastics team in the 1948 Summer Olympics, Turner and the rest of the team had little if any experience of competing at an international level, and were unofficially coached by Helmut Bantz, a recently released German prisoner of war who had stayed in England as an agricultural worker. Turner competed in the Men's Individual All-Around, the Men's Team All-Around, the Men's Floor Exercise, the Men's Horse Vault, the Men's Parallel Bars, the Men's Horizontal Bar, the Men's Rings, and the Men's Pommelled Horse. A lifelong friend was fellow competitor George Weedon.

Turner was also at the 1952 Summer Olympics in Helsinki, competing in the Men's Individual All-Around, the Men's Team All-Around, the Men's Floor Exercise, the Men's Horse Vault, the Men's Parallel Bars, the Men's Horizontal Bar, the Men's Rings, and Men's Pommelled Horse.

In the 1956 Summer Olympics in Melbourne Turner competed in the Men's Individual All-Around, the Men's Floor Exercise, the Men's Horse Vault, the Men's Parallel Bars, the Men's Horizontal Bar, the Men's Rings, and the Men's Pommelled Horse. As National Coach to the British gymnastics team, he also attended the 1960 Summer Olympics in Rome.

Turner was four times British all-around gymnastics champion, from 1949 to 1951, and again in 1953. He also took part in the 1950 World Championships in Basel, and the 1954 European Championships in Frankfurt.

== Post-gymnastics career ==
He achieved his International Judges Brevet award in 1963 and was awarded his 'Master Gymnast' in 1974. In 1964 he took a BA degree in Sports science at the Royal Polytechnic and a BEd from the Open University before becoming a lecturer at Watford College of Technology and Dulwich College. He was made a Freeman of the City of London in 1965. He was also a Freemason. He doubled for actors including Michael Bentine and Norman Wisdom when gymnastic stunts were required in films and television dramas. He received the Honorary Award of 'Distinguished Judge' from British Gymnastics. With his wife he had two sons, Keith and Colin Turner.

== Death ==
Frank Turner died of cancer at his home in Bricket Wood in Hertfordshire in September 2010 aged 87. His ashes were scattered in a field in Aldenham.
