= Nicolas Kanivé =

Luxembourgish gymnast and long jumper

- Born: 23 November 1887 Luxembourg City, Luxembourg
- Died: 12 July 1966 (aged 78) Luxembourg City, Luxembourg

Gymnastics career
- Discipline: Men's artistic gymnastics
- Country represented: Luxembourg

Nicolas Kanivé (23 November 1887 - 12 July 1966) was a Luxembourgish gymnast and athlete who competed in the 1912 Summer Olympics and in the 1920 Summer Olympics.

In 1912, he was a member of the Luxembourgish team, which finished fourth in the team, European system competition and fifth in the team, free system event. In the individual all-around competition, he finished 20th. Eight years later, he participated as a long jumper and finished 29th and last in the Olympic long jump event in 1920.
