= Imre Gellért =

Hungarian gymnast (1888–1981)

- Born: 8 July 1888
- Died: 31 March 1981 (aged 92)

Gymnastics career
- Discipline: Men's artistic gymnastics
- Country represented: Hungary
Medal record
Olympic Games
Silver medal – second place	1912 Stockholm	Team, european system

Imre Gellért (8 June 1888 – 31 March 1981) was a Hungarian gymnast who competed in the 1908 Summer Olympics and in the 1912 Summer Olympics. In 1908 he participated in the individual all-around competition and finished 39th. He was part of the Hungarian team, which won the silver medal in the gymnastics men's team, European system event in 1912. In the individual all-around competition he finished 17th.

== See also ==
- List of select Jewish gymnasts
