= Harry Dickason (gymnast) =

British artistic gymnast (1890–1962)

- Full name: Harold Dickason
- Born: 16 April 1890 Hebden, North Yorkshire, England
- Died: 21 January 1962 (aged 71) Birmingham, England

Gymnastics career
- Discipline: Men's artistic gymnastics
- Country represented: (United Kingdom) Great Britain
Medal record
Men's artistic gymnastics
Representing Great Britain
Olympic Games
Bronze medal – third place	1912 Stockholm	Team, European system

Harry Dickason (16 April 1890 – 21 January 1962) was a British gymnast who competed in the 1912 Summer Olympics.

He was part of the British team, which won the bronze medal in the gymnastics men's team, European system event in 1912.

Harry worked at Cadburys for 44 1/2 years in the Sheet Metal Department and then the Mould Makers department. His brothers (Willie and Albert) and his four sisters (Gertrude, Doreen, Elsie and Florence) also all worked for Cadburys. His Aunt (Eliza Shrimpton) was Richard Cadbury's Housekeeper.
