= Charles Vigurs =

British gymnast (1888–1917)

- Full name: Charles Alfred Vigurs
- Born: 11 July 1888 Birmingham, England
- Died: 22 February 1917 (aged 28) Grenay, Pas-de-Calais, France

Gymnastics career
- Discipline: Men's artistic gymnastics
- Country represented: (United Kingdom) Great Britain
Medal record
Men's artistic gymnastics
Representing Great Britain
Olympic Games
Bronze medal – third place	1912 Stockholm	Team, European system

Charles Alfred Vigurs (11 July 1888 – 22 February 1917) was a British gymnast who competed in the 1908 Summer Olympics and in the 1912 Summer Olympics. He was born in Birmingham, West Midlands.

As a member of the British team in 1908, he finished eighth in the team competition. Four years later, he was part of the British team, which won the bronze medal in the gymnastics men's team European system event.

Vigurs was killed in action at age 28 during the First World War, serving as a private with the Royal Warwickshire Regiment near Grenay. He was buried in the Maroc British Cemetery nearby.

== See also ==
- List of Olympians killed in World War I
