= Bernard Franklin =

British artistic gymnast

- Full name: Bernard Wallis Franklin
- Born: 10 November 1889 Battersea, England
- Died: 2 January 1937 (aged 47) Muswell Hill, England

Gymnastics career
- Discipline: Men's artistic gymnastics
- Country represented: (United Kingdom) Great Britain
Medal record
Men's artistic gymnastics
Representing Great Britain
Olympic Games
Bronze medal – third place	1912 Stockholm	Team, European system

Bernard Wallis Franklin (10 November 1889 – 2 January 1937) was a British gymnast who competed in the 1912 Summer Olympics and in the 1920 Summer Olympics. He was born in London.

He was part of the British team, which won the bronze medal in the gymnastics men's team, European system event in 1912. As a member of the British team in 1920 he finished fifth in the team, European system competition.
