= Marvin Campbell (gymnast) =

British gymnast (born 1961)

- Born: 14 July 1961 (age 65) Manchester, England

Gymnastics career
- Discipline: Men's artistic gymnastics
- Country represented: (United Kingdom) Great Britain

Marvin Campbell (born 14 July 1961) is a British gymnast and stunt performer. He competed in eight events at the 1992 Summer Olympics.

Campbell retired from competitive gymnastics in April 1996, after not securing a place for the 1996 Olympic Games, but continued to work as a gymnastics coach for a number of years. Since his first credited appearance in the 2002 film 28 Days Later he has worked as a professional stuntman and minor cast member in numerous Hollywood films and TV shows. These include all five James Bond films of the Daniel Craig era, Harry Potter and the Deathly Hallows: Part 1 and Part 2, Morbius, Mission: Impossible - The Final Reckoning, and Inception. His performance alongside Joseph Gordon-Levitt in the rotating hallway fight scene in Inception has been described as one of the best movie fight scenes of all time.
