= Arthur Whitford =

British gymnast (1908-1996)

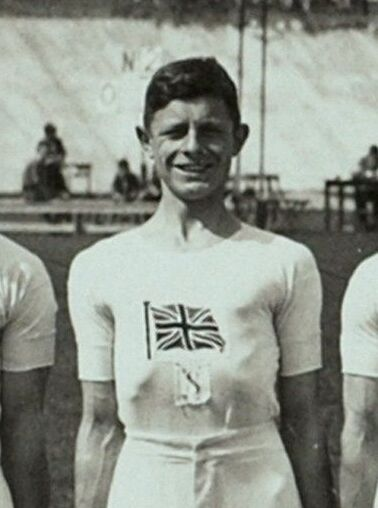
- Whitford in 1928

Personal information
- Full name: Arthur John Whitford
- Born: 2 July 1908 Swansea, Wales
- Died: 7 January 1996 (aged 87) Swansea, Wales
- Relatives: Jack Whitford (half-brother)

Gymnastics career
- Discipline: Men's artistic gymnastics
- Country represented: (United Kingdom) Great Britain

Arthur John Whitford (2 July 1908 – 7 January 1996) was a British gymnast. He competed in seven events at the 1928 Summer Olympics, and was a ten-time British national champion.

== Early life ==
Whitford was born in July 1908 in Swansea. He began to take up gymnastics at the age of 12, at his local church club. Following the closure of the club, he joined the gym club at the YMCA in Swansea. Two weeks after joining, he represented the club in the local boys' final.

== Gymnastics career ==
Whitford competed in gymnastics during the 1920s and 1930s, becoming the national champion for nine consecutive years from 1928 to 1936, and winning his tenth national title in 1939. Whitford also won two Irish titles, four Scottish titles, and nine Welsh titles.

Whitford was part of the Great Britain team that competed at the 1928 Summer Olympics in Amsterdam. His best individual performance was 61st place in the men's vault, with the British team finishing in eleventh place overall.

After initially stopping to compete competitively when he won his ninth national title in 1936, Whitford returned to competition two years later. His aim was to compete at the 1940 Summer Olympics in Helsinki, but the games were cancelled due to World War II.

== Post-gymnastics career ==
As there was no competitions being held because of the war, Whitford became a coach, and coached his half-brother Jack. Jack would also go on to represent Great Britain at the Olympics, with him taking part at the 1952 Summer Olympics. Arthur Whitford also coached the British teams at the 1948 Summer Olympics and the 1952 Summer Olympics.

Whitford later owned a shoe shop in his hometown of Swansea, and died in January 1996, at the age of 87. He was inducted into the Welsh Sports Hall of Fame in 2004.
