= George Ross (gymnast) =

British gymnast (1877–1945)

- Born: 1 December 1877
- Died: 27 August 1945 (aged 67)

Gymnastics career
- Discipline: Men's artistic gymnastics
- Country represented: (United Kingdom) Great Britain
Medal record
Men's Gymnastics
Bronze medal – third place	1912 Stockholm	Team, european system

George James Ross (1 December 1877 – 27 August 1945) was a British gymnast who competed in the 1908 and 1912 Olympic Games.

As a member of the British team in 1908, he finished eighth in the team competition. He was part of the British team which won the bronze medal in the men's gymnastics team event in the European system in 1912.
