= Samuel Walker (gymnast) =

British gymnast (1883–1960)

- Full name: Samuel John Walker
- Born: 5 October 1883 Birmingham, England
- Died: 29 February 1960 (aged 76) Birmingham, England

Gymnastics career
- Discipline: Men's artistic gymnastics
- Country represented: (United Kingdom) Great Britain
Medal record
Men's artistic gymnastics
Representing Great Britain
Olympic Games
Bronze medal – third place	1912 Stockholm	Team, European system

Samuel John Walker (5 October 1883 – 29 February 1960) was a British gymnast who competed in the 1912 Summer Olympics. He was born in Birmingham, West Midlands. He was part of the British team, which won the bronze medal in the gymnastics men's team, European system event in 1912.
