= Harry Finchett =

British gymnast (1900–1968)

- Full name: Henry John Finchett
- Born: 26 September 1900 Birmingham, England
- Died: 17 October 1968 (aged 68) Sutton Coldfield, England

Gymnastics career
- Discipline: Men's artistic gymnastics
- Country represented: (United Kingdom) Great Britain

Henry John "Harry" Finchett (26 September 1900 – 17 October 1968) was a British gymnast. He competed at the 1920 Summer Olympics, the 1924 Summer Olympics and the 1928 Summer Olympics.
