= Charles Luck =

British gymnast (1886–1981)

- Full name: Charles James Luck
- Born: 19 November 1886 London, England
- Died: 1 February 1981 (aged 94) Havering, England

Gymnastics career
- Discipline: Men's artistic gymnastics
- Country represented: (United Kingdom) Great Britain
Medal record
Men's artistic gymnastics
Representing Great Britain
Olympic Games
Bronze medal – third place	1912 Stockholm	Team, European system

Charles James Luck (19 November 1886 – 1 February 1981) was a British gymnast who competed in the 1912 Summer Olympics.

He was part of the British team that won the bronze medal in the gymnastics men's team European system event in 1912.
