= Thomas Hopkins (gymnast) =

British gymnast (1903–1983)

- Born: 29 July 1903 Swansea, Wales
- Died: 23 January 1983 (aged 79) Reading, England

Gymnastics career
- Discipline: Men's artistic gymnastics
- Country represented: (United Kingdom) Great Britain

Thomas Hopkins (29 July 1903 – 23 January 1983) was a British gymnast. He competed in nine events at the 1924 Summer Olympics.
