= Leonard Hanson =

British gymnast (1887–1949)

- Born: 1 November 1887 Bradford, England
- Died: 27 October 1949 (aged 61) Bradford, England

Gymnastics career
- Discipline: Men's artistic gymnastics
- Country represented: (United Kingdom) Great Britain
Medal record
Men's artistic gymnastics
Representing Great Britain
Olympic Games
Bronze medal – third place	1912 Stockholm	Team, European system

Leonard Hanson (1 November 1887 – 27 October 1949) was a British gymnast who competed in the 1908 Summer Olympics and in the 1912 Summer Olympics. He was born in Bradford.

In 1908, he participated in the individual all-around competition, but his place is unknown. He was part of the British team, which won the bronze medal in the gymnastics men's team European system event in 1912. He finished twelfth in the individual all-around competition.
