= Alfred Messenger =

British gymnast (1887–1968)

- Full name: Alfred William Messenger
- Born: 4 December 1887 Birmingham, England
- Died: 1968 (aged 80–81) Birmingham, England

Gymnastics career
- Discipline: Men's artistic gymnastics
- Country represented: (United Kingdom) Great Britain
Medal record
Men's artistic gymnastics
Representing Great Britain
Olympic Games
Bronze medal – third place	1912 Stockholm	Team, European system

Alfred William Messenger (born 4 December 1887 - 1968) was a British gymnast who competed in the 1912 Summer Olympics. He was born in Birmingham, West Midlands.

He was part of the British team that won the bronze medal in the gymnastics men's team European system event in 1912. Following his 1912 medal win, he retired from gymnastics and returned to cabinet making. He enlisted in the army in 1915 and served in France and India.
