= Arthur Southern =

British gymnast (1883–1940)

- Born: 26 March 1883 Sowerby Bridge, England
- Died: 5 June 1940 (aged 57) Swanage, England

Gymnastics career
- Discipline: Men's artistic gymnastics
- Country represented: (United Kingdom) Great Britain
Medal record
Men's artistic gymnastics
Representing Great Britain
Olympic Games
Bronze medal – third place	1912 Stockholm	Team, European system

Arthur George Heron Southern (26 March 1883 – 5 June 1940) was a British gymnast who competed in the 1912 Summer Olympics. He was part of the British team, which won the bronze medal in the men's gymnastics team, European system event in 1912.
