= Samuel Hodgetts =

British artistic gymnast (1877–1944)

- Full name: Samuel Ernest Hodgetts
- Born: 28 October 1877 Birmingham, England
- Died: 4 March 1944 (aged 66) Birmingham, England

Gymnastics career
- Discipline: Men's artistic gymnastics
- Country represented: (United Kingdom) Great Britain
Medal record
Men's artistic gymnastics
Representing Great Britain
Olympic Games
Bronze medal – third place	1912 Stockholm	Team, European system

Samuel Ernest Hodgetts (28 October 1877 – 1944) was a British gymnast who competed in the 1908, 1912 and 1920 Summer Olympics. He was born in Birmingham, West Midlands.

In 1908, he participated in the individual all-around competition and finished eighth.

He was part of the British team, which won the bronze medal in the gymnastics men's team European system event in 1912. In the individual all-around competition, he finished 25th.

As a member of the British team in 1920, he finished fifth in the team, European system competition.
