= Ernest Leigh =

British gymnast (1895–1960)

- Born: 17 January 1895 Swansea, Wales
- Died: 11 October 1960 (aged 65) Swansea, Wales
- Relatives: Stanley Leigh (brother)

Gymnastics career
- Discipline: Men's artistic gymnastics
- Country represented: (United Kingdom) Great Britain

Ernest Leigh (17 January 1895 – 11 October 1960) was a British gymnast. He competed in nine events at the 1924 Summer Olympics.
