= William MacKune =

British gymnast (1882–1955)

- Born: 6 August 1882 Liverpool, England
- Died: 31 August 1955 (aged 73) Orangetown, New York, US

Gymnastics career
- Discipline: Men's artistic gymnastics
- Country represented: (United Kingdom) Great Britain
Medal record
Men's artistic gymnastics
Representing Great Britain
Olympic Games
Bronze medal – third place	1912 Stockholm	Team, European system

William MacKune (6 August 1882 – 31 August 1955) was a British gymnast who competed in the 1912 Summer Olympics. He was born in Liverpool. He was part of the British team, which won the bronze medal in the gymnastics men's team, European system event in 1912.
