= Jasper Smith-Gordon =

British gymnast (born 2002)

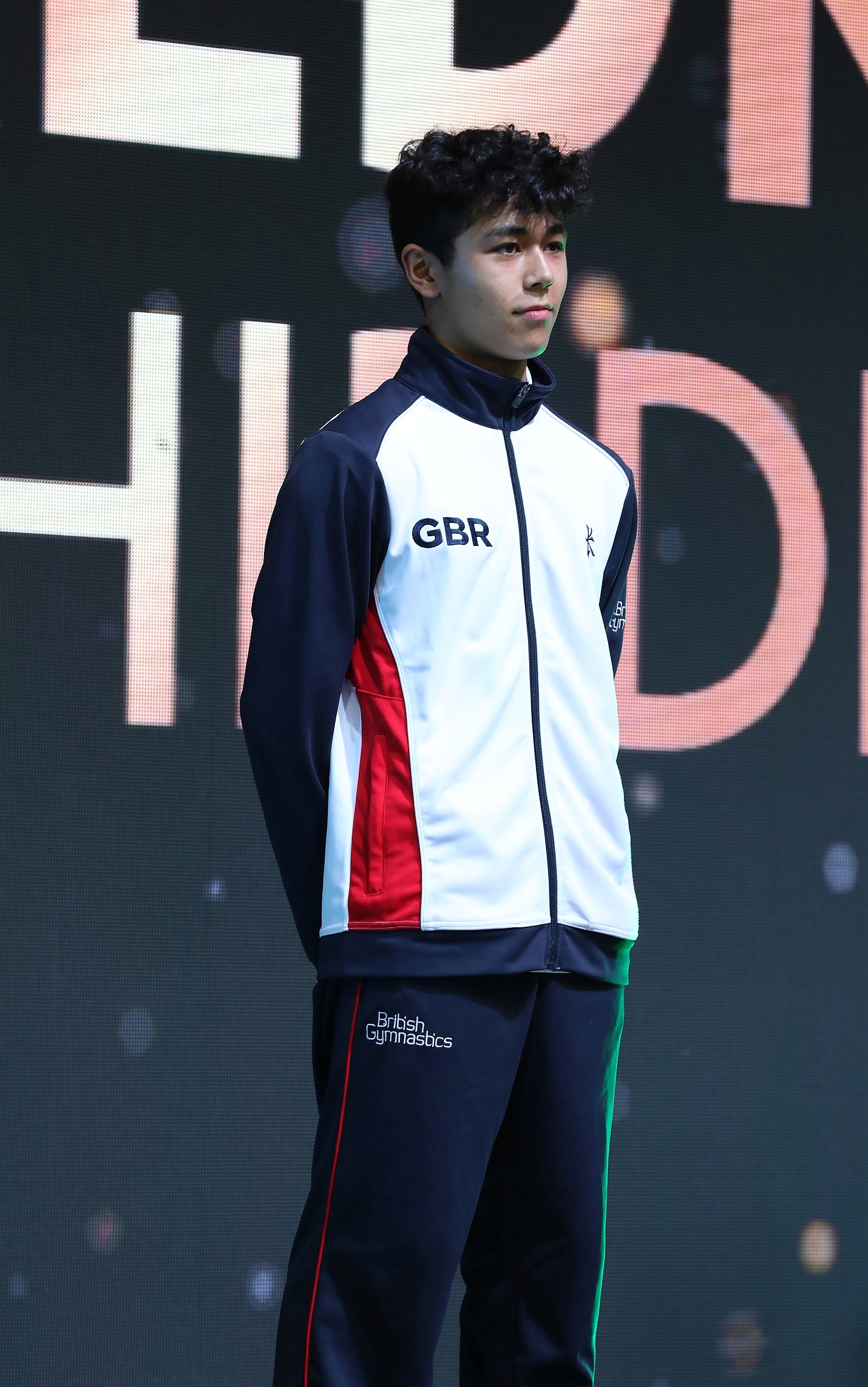
- Jasper Smith-Gordon in 2019

Personal information
- Full name: Jasper Eldred Kai Smith-Gordon
- Born: 9 September 2002 (age 23) Singapore

Gymnastics career
- Discipline: Men's artistic gymnastics
- Country represented: (United Kingdom) Great Britain
- College team: California Golden Bears (2022–2026)
- Club: Woking Gymnastics Club
Medal record
Representing United Kingdom
Men's artistic gymnastics
Junior World Championships
Bronze medal – third place	2019 Győr	Vault

Jasper Eldred Kai Smith-Gordon (born 9 September 2002) is a British artistic gymnast. In 2019, he won the bronze medal in the vault event at the 2019 Junior World Artistic Gymnastics Championships held in Győr, Hungary.

== Gymnastics career ==
Smith-Gordon joined the California Golden Bears men's gymnastics team as a redshirt freshman in 2023 and quickly established himself as one of the program's top vaulters. That season, he broke the school vault record and earned CGA Regular Season All-American honors.

In 2024, he ranked among the top vaulters nationally, recording multiple scores of 14.700 or higher and qualifying for the NCAA Championships final on vault.

During the 2025 season, he won the MPSF vault title and again qualified for the NCAA Championships final, while also earning conference and academic honors.

As a redshirt senior in 2026, Smith-Gordon finished the regular season as the nation’s top-ranked vaulter and set a program record with a score of 14.550, in addition to winning multiple event titles and receiving the ACC Excellence Award.

== Personal life ==
Smith-Gordon's parents are Kumi Suzuki and Lionel George Eldred Smith-Gordon, heir apparent of the Smith-Gordon Baronetcy.

== Awards and honours ==
- 2× CGA Regular Season All-American (Vault) (2023–2024)
- 2× NCAA Championships Finals qualifier (Vault) (2024–2025)
- MPSF Vault Champion (2025)
- 4× All-MPSF (Vault ×3, Pommel Horse ×1) (2024–2026)
- 2× MPSF Vault Runner Up (2024, 2026)
- 1× MPSF Pommel Horse Bronze Medalist (2026)
- CGA Specialist of the Week (2023)
- CGA Rookie of the Week (2023)
- MPSF Specialist of the Week (2023)
- Holds the school record on vault under the 2017–2024 scoring system
- Holds the program's highest vault score under the modern scoring system
- ACC Excellence Award (2026)
- 3× CGA First-Team Academic All-American (2023–2025)
- 2× CSC Academic All-District (2023–2024)
- 2× MPSF All-Academic (2023–2024)
- ACC Academic Honor Roll (2024–2025)
- 2× Pac-12 Academic Honor Roll (2023–2024)
- Cal Gatorade Student-Athlete of the Month (March 2023)
- 2× Golden Bear Award (2024–2025)
- Keeney–Frey Award (2025)
