= Paul Bowler =

British gymnast (born 1967)

- Born: 13 October 1967 (age 58) Manchester, England

Gymnastics career
- Discipline: Men's artistic gymnastics
- Country represented: (United Kingdom) Great Britain; England
- Club: Manchester Central IG
Medal record
Men's artistic gymnastics
Representing England
Commonwealth Games
Bronze medal – third place	1994 Victoria	Team

Paul Martin Bowler (born 13 October 1967) is a male former British gymnast. Bowler competed in eight events at the 1992 Summer Olympics. He represented England and won a bronze medal in the team event, at the 1994 Commonwealth Games in Victoria, British Columbia, Canada.
