= Sidney Cross (gymnast) =

British artistic gymnast (1891–1964)

- Born: 5 January 1891 Hoxton, England
- Died: 7 October 1964 (aged 73) Chichester, England

Gymnastics career
- Discipline: Men's artistic gymnastics
- Country represented: (United Kingdom) Great Britain
Medal record
Men's artistic gymnastics
Representing Great Britain
Olympic Games
Bronze medal – third place	1912 Stockholm	Team, European system

Sidney Cross (5 January 1891 – 7 October 1964) was a British gymnast who competed in the 1912 Summer Olympics and in the 1920 Summer Olympics.

He was part of the British team that won the bronze medal in the gymnastics men's team, European system event in 1912. As a member of the British team in 1920, he finished fifth in the team, European system competition.
