= Ken Buffin =

British gymnast (1923–1972)

- Born: 1 November 1923 Barry, Vale of Glamorgan, Wales
- Died: 9 December 1972 (aged 49) Cardiff, Wales

Gymnastics career
- Discipline: Men's artistic gymnastics
- Country represented: (United Kingdom) Great Britain

Ken Buffin (1 November 1923 – 9 December 1972) was a British gymnast. He competed at the 1948 Summer Olympics, the 1952 Summer Olympics and the 1960 Summer Olympics.
