= Antoine Wehrer =

Luxembourgish gymnast

- Born: 2 February 1890 Mamer, Luxembourg

Gymnastics career
- Discipline: Men's artistic gymnastics
- Country represented: Luxembourg

Antoine Wehrer (2 February 1890 - 12 February 1952) was a Luxembourgish gymnast who competed in the 1912 Summer Olympics. In 1912 he was a member of the Luxembourgish team which finished fourth in the team, European system competition and fifth in the team, free system event.
