= Peter Starling =

British gymnast (1925–1984)

- Full name: Owen Peter Charles Starling
- Born: 15 August 1925 Norwich, England
- Died: 8 December 1984 (aged 59) Norwich, England

Gymnastics career
- Discipline: Men's artistic gymnastics
- Country represented: (United Kingdom) Great Britain

Owen Peter Charles Starling (15 August 1925 – 8 December 1984) was a British gymnast. He competed at the 1952 Summer Olympics and the 1960 Summer Olympics.
