= Alfred Spencer =

British gymnast (1887–1966)

- Born: 8 March 1887 Bradford, England
- Died: 13 January 1966 (aged 78) Bradford, England

Gymnastics career
- Discipline: Men's artistic gymnastics
- Country represented: (United Kingdom) Great Britain

Alfred Spencer (8 March 1887 – 13 January 1966) was a British gymnast. He competed in nine events at the 1924 Summer Olympics.
