= Jack Whitford =

British gymnast (1924–2023)

- Full name: John Alexander Whitford
- Born: 3 January 1924 Swansea, Wales
- Died: 5 June 2023 (aged 99)
- Spouse: Pat Evans
- Relatives: Arthur Whitford (half brother)

Gymnastics career
- Discipline: Men's artistic gymnastics
- Country represented: (United Kingdom) Great Britain

John Alexander Whitford (3 January 1924 – 5 June 2023) was a British gymnast who competed in the 1952 Summer Olympics. He was born in Swansea, was affiliated with Swansea Boys Club and is the half brother of gymnast Arthur Whitford, who represented Great Britain at the 1928 Summer Olympics. Whitford married fellow gymnastics Olympian Pat Evans and died on 5 June 2023, at the age of 99.
