= Stan Humphreys =

British gymnast (1904–1984)

- Full name: Stanley Humphreys
- Born: 15 June 1904 Bolton, England
- Died: 1984 (aged 79–80) Douglas, Isle of Man

Gymnastics career
- Discipline: Men's artistic gymnastics
- Country represented: (United Kingdom) Great Britain

Stan Humphreys (15 June 1904 – 1984) was a British gymnast. He competed at the 1924 Summer Olympics and the 1928 Summer Olympics.
