= Reginald Potts =

British gymnast (1892–1968)

- Full name: Reginald Hubert Potts
- Born: 3 January 1892 London, England
- Died: 21 March 1968 (aged 76) Worthing, England

Gymnastics career
- Discipline: Men's artistic gymnastics
- Country represented: (United Kingdom) Great Britain
Medal record
Men's artistic gymnastics
Representing Great Britain
Olympic Games
Bronze medal – third place	1912 Stockholm	Team, European system

Reginald Hubert Potts (3 January 1892 – 21 March 1968) was a British gymnast who competed in the 1912 Summer Olympics. He was on the British team, which won the bronze medal in the gymnastics men's team European system event in 1912. In the individual all-around competition, he finished 32nd.
