= Edward Pepper =

British gymnast (1879–1960)

- Full name: Edward Ernest Pepper
- Born: 2 November 1879 Birmingham, England
- Died: 1960 (aged 80–81) Enfield, London, England

Gymnastics career
- Discipline: Men's artistic gymnastics
- Country represented: (United Kingdom) Great Britain
Medal record
Men's artistic gymnastics
Representing Great Britain
Olympic Games
Bronze medal – third place	1912 Stockholm	Team, European system

Edward Ernest Pepper (2 November 1879 – 1960) was a British gymnast who competed in the 1912 Summer Olympics. He was born in Birmingham, West Midlands. He was part of the British team, which won the bronze medal in the gymnastics men's team, European system event in 1912.
