= Fred Hawkins (gymnast) =

British gymnast (1896–1976)

- Full name: Frederick William Hawkins
- Born: 10 November 1896 Hanley, Stoke-on-Trent, England
- Died: 14 June 1976 (aged 79) Stoke-on-Trent, England

Gymnastics career
- Discipline: Men's artistic gymnastics
- Country represented: (United Kingdom) Great Britain

Frederick William Hawkins (10 November 1896 – 14 June 1976) was a British gymnast. He competed in nine events at the 1924 Summer Olympics.
