= Edward Potts (gymnast) =

British artistic gymnast (1881–1944)

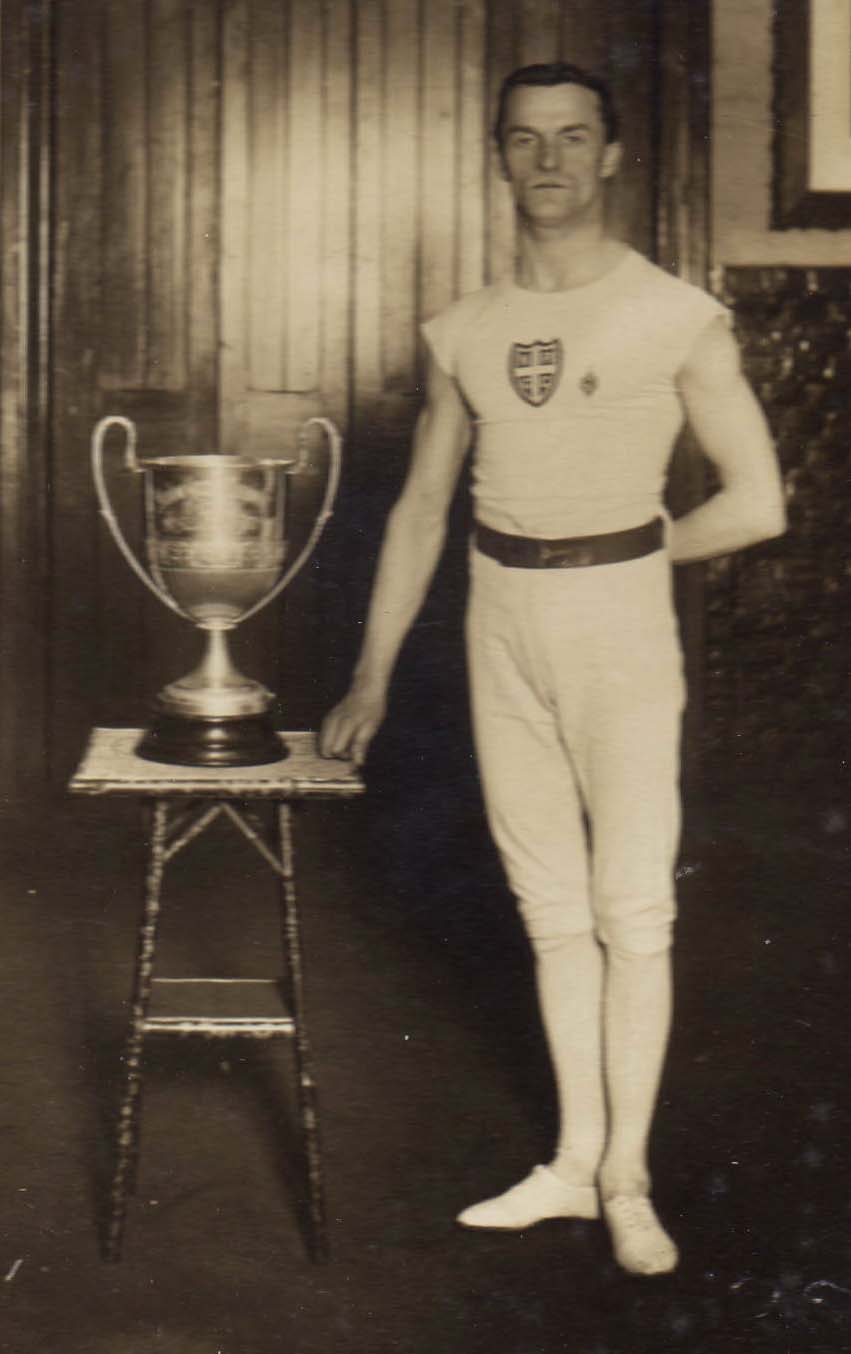
- Potts in 1912

Personal information
- Full name: Edward William Potts
- Born: 12 July 1881 Penge, England
- Died: 14 September 1944 (aged 63) Penge, England

Gymnastics career
- Discipline: Men's artistic gymnastics
- Country represented: (United Kingdom) Great Britain
Medal record
Men's artistic gymnastics
Representing Great Britain
Olympic Games
Bronze medal – third place	1912 Stockholm	Team, European system

Edward William Potts (July 12, 1881 – September 14, 1944) was a British gymnast who competed in the 1908 Summer Olympics and in the 1912 Summer Olympics. In the 1908 London Olympics, he participated in the individual all-around competition and finished ninth.

At the 1912 Stockholm Olympics, he was part of the British team which won the bronze medal in the gymnastics men's team, European system. He was the winner of the Individual Gymnastic Championship of England in 1912. Among other successes, he won the German Gymnastic Society (GGS) Open Championship in 1907, 1908 and 1909 and was a member of their winning international team in 1909. He was also the winner of the Metropolitan and Southern Counties Amateur Gymnastic Association (MESCAGA) championship in 1910 and 1911.
