= Albert Betts =

British artistic gymnast (1888–1924)

- Full name: Albert Edward Betts
- Born: 8 February 1888 Birmingham, West Midlands, England
- Died: 20 February 1924 (aged 36)

Gymnastics career
- Discipline: Men's artistic gymnastics
- Country represented: (United Kingdom) Great Britain
Medal record
Men's artistic gymnastics
Representing Great Britain
Olympic Games
Bronze medal – third place	1912 Stockholm	Team, European system

Albert Edward Betts (8 February 1888 – 20 February 1924) was a British gymnast who competed in the 1912 Summer Olympics and in the 1920 Summer Olympics. He was born in Birmingham, West Midlands, and was the fifth child and fourth son of John Betts (1854-1912) and Ellen (née Pountney) (1855-1944).

He was part of the British team, which won the bronze medal in the gymnastics men's team, European system event in 1912. As a member of the British team in 1920 he finished fifth in the team, European system competition.
