= David Cox (gymnast) =

British gymnast (born 1970)

- Full name: David C.J. Cox
- Born: 20 June 1970 (age 56) Johannesburg, South Africa

Gymnastics career
- Discipline: Men's artistic gymnastics
- Country represented: (United Kingdom) Great Britain; Scotland
- Club: Southampton AGC; Liverpool Gymnastics Club
Medal record
Men's artistic gymnastics
Representing England
Commonwealth Games
Silver medal – second place	1990 Auckland	Team

David C.J. Cox (born 20 June 1970) is a male retired British gymnast. Cox competed in eight events at the 1992 Summer Olympics. He represented England and won a silver medal in the team event, at the 1990 Commonwealth Games in Auckland, New Zealand.
