= John Whitaker (gymnast) =

English gymnast (1886–1977)

John T. Whitaker
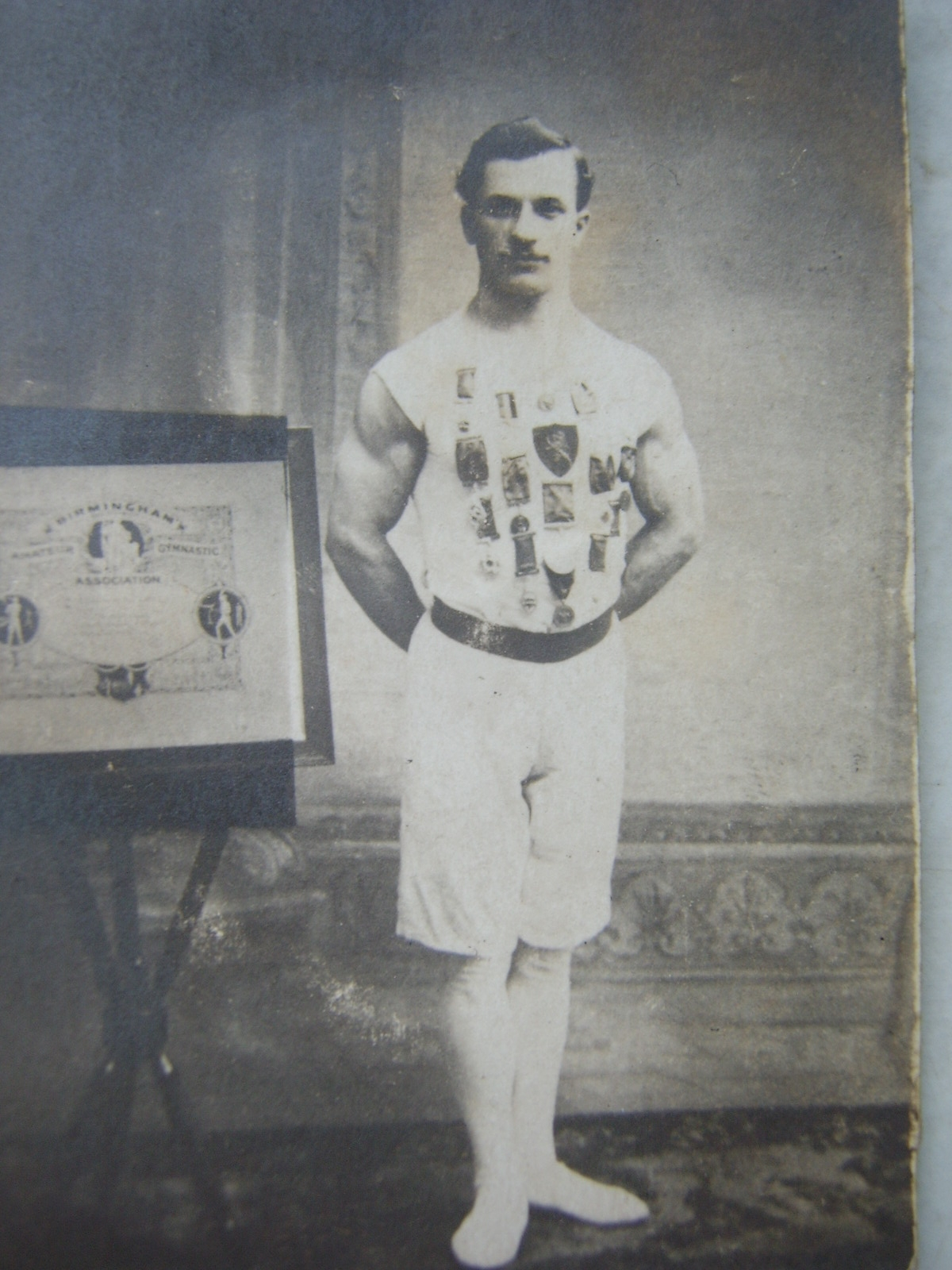

Personal information
- Born: 9 April 1886 Birmingham, England
- Died: 21 May 1977 (aged 91)

Gymnastics career
- Country represented: (United Kingdom) Great Britain
Medal record
Men's Gymnastics
Bronze medal – third place	1912 Stockholm	Team, european system

John T. Whitaker (9 April 1886 – 21 May 1977) was a British gymnast who competed in the 1908 Summer Olympics and in the 1912 Summer Olympics. As a member of the British team in 1908, he finished eighth in the team competition. He was part of the British team, which won the bronze medal in the men's gymnastics team, European system event in 1912. In the individual all-around competition, he finished 21st.
