= Jack Pancott =

British gymnast (1933–2015)

- Full name: John Edward Pancott
- Born: 1 April 1933 Farnborough, Hampshire, England
- Died: 10 September 2015 (aged 82) Berwyn, Pennsylvania, US

Gymnastics career
- Discipline: Men's artistic gymnastics
- Country represented: (United Kingdom) Great Britain

John Edward Pancott (1 April 1933 – 10 September 2015) was a British gymnast. He competed at the 1960 Summer Olympics and the 1964 Summer Olympics.
