= Stanley Leigh =

British gymnast (1901–1986)

- Born: 27 December 1901 Swansea, Wales
- Died: June 1986 (aged 84) Swansea, Wales
- Relatives: Ernest Leigh (brother)

Gymnastics career
- Discipline: Men's artistic gymnastics
- Country represented: (United Kingdom) Great Britain

Stanley Leigh (27 December 1901 – June 1986) was a British gymnast. He competed at the 1920 Summer Olympics and the 1924 Summer Olympics.
