= Herbert Drury (gymnast) =

British artistic gymnast (1883–1936)

- Full name: Herbert James Drury
- Born: 5 January 1883
- Died: 11 July 1936 (aged 53)

Gymnastics career
- Country represented: (United Kingdom) Great Britain
Medal record
Men's Gymnastics
| Bronze medal – third place | 1912 Stockholm | Team, european system |

Herbert James Drury (5 January 1883 – 11 July 1936) was a British gymnast who competed in the 1908 Summer Olympics and in the 1912 Summer Olympics. As a member of the British team in 1908, he finished eighth in the team competition. He was part of the British team, which won the bronze medal in the men's gymnastics team, European system event in 1912.
