= John Mulhall (gymnast) =

British gymnast (1938–2022)

- Full name: John William Mulhall
- Born: 18 August 1938 Cardiff, Wales
- Died: 6 August 2022 (aged 83)

Gymnastics career
- Discipline: Men's artistic gymnastics
- Country represented: (United Kingdom) Great Britain

John William Mulhall (18 August 1938 – 6 August 2022) was a British gymnast. He competed at the 1960 Summer Olympics and the 1964 Summer Olympics.
