= Ronald McLean =

British gymnast (1881–1941)

- Full name: Ronald Gordon McLean
- Born: 26 March 1881 London, England
- Died: 2 July 1941 (aged 60) Shirley, England

Gymnastics career
- Discipline: Men's artistic gymnastics
- Country represented: (United Kingdom) Great Britain
Medal record
Men's artistic gymnastics
Representing Great Britain
Olympic Games
| Bronze medal – third place | 1912 Stockholm | Team, European system |

Ronald Gordon McLean (26 March 1881 – 2 July 1941) was a British gymnast who competed in the 1912 Summer Olympics and in the 1920 Summer Olympics. He was born in London.

He was part of the British team that won the bronze medal in the gymnastics men's team, European system event in 1912. As a member of the British team in 1920, he finished fifth in the team, European system competition.
