= Charles Simmons (gymnast) =

British gymnast (1885–1945)

- Born: 24 December 1885 Islington, London, England
- Died: 15 February 1945 (aged 59) Cricklewood, North London, England
- Relatives: Jean Simmons (daughter)

Gymnastics career
- Discipline: Men's artistic gymnastics
- Country represented: (United Kingdom) Great Britain
Medal record
Men's gymnastics
Representing Great Britain
Olympic Games
Bronze medal – third place	1912 Stockholm	Team, european system

Charles Simmons (24 December 1885 – 15 February 1945) was a British gymnast who competed in the 1912 Summer Olympics.

He was born on 24 December 1885 in Islington, London. He was part of the British team that won the bronze medal in the men's gymnastics team European system event in 1912. In the individual all-around competition, he finished 28th.

Simmons worked as a physical training instructor. He married Winifred Ada Loveland on 23 May 1914 at St Mark's Church, Tollington Park, London, and had four children, the youngest of whom was the actress Jean Simmons. He died on 15 February 1945 in London.
