= Henry Oberholzer =

British gymnast (1893–1953)

- Full name: Henry Arthur Oberholzer
- Born: 12 April 1893 St Pancras, London, England
- Died: 20 March 1953 (aged 59) Newport, Wales

Gymnastics career
- Discipline: Men's artistic gymnastics
- Country represented: (United Kingdom) Great Britain
Medal record
Men's artistic gymnastics
Representing Great Britain
Olympic Games
Bronze medal – third place	1912 Stockholm	Team, European system

Henry Arthur Oberholzer (12 April 1893 – 20 March 1953) was a British gymnast who competed in the 1912 Summer Olympics. He was part of the British team, which won the bronze medal in the men's gymnastics team, European system event in 1912.

Oberholzer was the British champion after winning the 1913 lightweight title at the British Wrestling Championships.
