= Gymnastics at the 1912 Summer Olympics – Men's team =

Men's team gymnastics at the Games of the V Olympiad
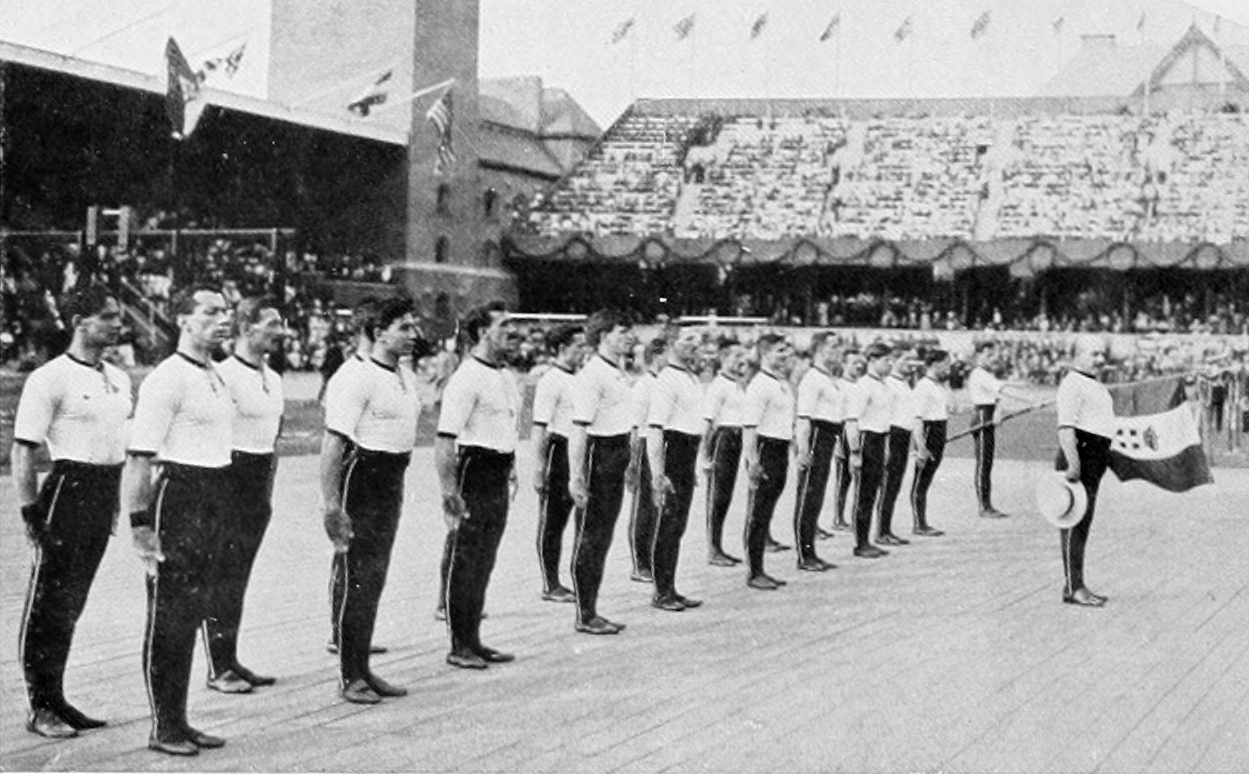
- The gold winning team of Italy.
- Venue: Stockholm Olympic Stadium
- Date: July 11, 1912
- Competitors: 91 from 5 nations

Medalists
1st place, gold medalist(s)		Italy
2nd place, silver medalist(s)		Hungary
3rd place, bronze medalist(s)		Great Britain

The men's team, European system was an artistic gymnastics event held as part of the Gymnastics at the 1912 Summer Olympics programme. It was one of three team gymnastics events. The others were a team competition in the Swedish system and one in the free system.

It was the third appearance of the event, which had made its debut in 1904. The official name was Team Competition II - with exercises according to special conditions. For every nation one team was allowed to participate. One team had to consist of not less than 16 nor more than 40 members. The entry was closed on June 6, 1912. As all other gymnastic competitions the event took place in the Olympiastadion.

The competition was held on Thursday July 11, 1912 in the time from 9:30 a.m. to 12:30 p.m. and from 2:00 p.m. to 4:00 p.m.

== Starting order ==
No.	Team	Time	Team Leader	Outfit
1	Luxembourg	9:30 - 10:30	Valentin Peffer	White jersey, with sleeves reaching to elbows; black stockinet pantaloons with white facings.
2	Hungary	10:30 - 11:30	Rezső Bábel	White gymnastic jersey with long sleeves, and with the Hungarian arms on the breast; white trousers; yellow belt; white shoes.
3	Germany	11:30 - 12:30	Hermann Kuhr	White jersey with broad vertical field on breast and back; long sleeves; white trousers; black belt; yellow shoes.
4	Great Britain	2:00 - 3:00	Charles Joseph West/R. Oberholzer	White jersey with short arms, and with Great Britain's flag on breast; white knickerbockers; red belt; white stockings and shoes.
5	Italy	3:00 - 4:00	Cornelio Cavalli	White jersey with sleeves to elbows; black stockinet pantaloons with straps; black soft shoes.

== Results ==
=== Judges ===
Chief Leader: Einar Nerman

No.	Judge	Country
1	Abr. Clod-Hansen	DEN
2	Cesare Tifi	ITA
3	A. E. Syson	GBR
4	Wagner Hohenlobbese	GER
5	Michael Bély	HUN

Scores are an average of five judges' marks.

=== Score boards ===
==== Luxembourg ====
Apparatus	Execution	(Denmark) Clod-Hansen	(Italy) Tifi	(United Kingdom) Syson	(Germany) Wagner	(Hungary) Bély	Total	Average
Free	Carriage	1	0.75	0.25	0	0.50		
Free	Execution	9	7	2	6	6		
Horizontal; Bar	to apparatus	1	0.50	0.25	0	1		
Horizontal; Bar	Execution	9	6.50	3.25	0	1		
Horizontal; Bar	from apparatus	1	0.25	0.25	6	4		
Parallel; Bars	to apparatus	0.75	0.50	0.25	1	1		
Parallel; Bars	Execution	8	7	4.75	6	3		
Parallel; Bars	from apparatus	1	0.75	0.25	1	1		
Horse	to apparatus	0.75	0.75	0.25	1	1		
Horse	Execution	9	5	4	8	4		
Horse	from apparatus	1	0.75	0.25	1	1		
Free	Execution	9	7	6.25	8	9		
	Total	50.50	36.75	22	38	32.50	179.75	35.95

==== Hungary ====
Apparatus	Execution	(Denmark) Clod-Hansen	(Italy) Tifi	(United Kingdom) Syson	(Germany) Wagner	(Hungary) Bély	Total	Average
Free	Carriage	0.75	1.50	1	1	2		
Free	Execution	7.75	9	6.75	9	10		
Horizontal; Bar	to apparatus	0.25	0.75	0.50	1	1		
Horizontal; Bar	Execution	3	8	6.50	8	8.50		
Horizontal; Bar	from apparatus	1	0.75	0.50	1	1		
Parallel; Bars	to apparatus	0.75	0.75	0.50	1	1		
Parallel; Bars	Execution	5	7	7.25	9	8		
Parallel; Bars	from apparatus	0.75	0.75	0.50	1	1		
Horse	to apparatus	1	0.75	0.50	1	1		
Horse	Execution	9	6	6.75	9	10		
Horse	from apparatus	1	0.75	0.25	1	1		
Free	Execution	7	8	8.50	10	10		
	Total	37.25	44	39.50	52	54.50	227.25	45.45

==== Germany ====
Apparatus	Execution	(Denmark) Clod-Hansen	(Italy) Tifi	(United Kingdom) Syson	(Germany) Wagner	(Hungary) Bély	Total	Average
Free	Carriage	1	1.25	0.75	1	0.75		
Free	Execution	7	6	5	7	4		
Horizontal; Bar	to apparatus	0.25	0.50	0.50	1	0.75		
Horizontal; Bar	Execution	7	5	5.50	9	3.50		
Horizontal; Bar	from apparatus	0.25	0.50	0.25	1	0.75		
Parallel; Bars	to apparatus	0.25	0.50	0.50	1	0.75		
Parallel; Bars	Execution	7	4	6	8	3.25		
Parallel; Bars	from apparatus	0.50	0.50	0.50	1	0.75		
Horse	to apparatus	0.25	0.50	0.25	1	0.50		
Horse	Execution	5	4	5.25	8	3		
Horse	from apparatus	0.25	0.50	0.50	1	0.50		
Free	Execution	4	4	5.25	10	4.25		
	Total	32.75	27.25	30.25	49	22.75	162	32.40

==== Great Britain ====
Apparatus	Execution	(Denmark) Clod-Hansen	(Italy) Tifi	(United Kingdom) Syson	(Germany) Wagner	(Hungary) Bély	Total	Average
Free	Carriage	1	1.25	1	1	1.25		
Free	Execution	9	7	6.50	8	5		
Horizontal; Bar	to apparatus	1	0.50	0.25	1	0.75		
Horizontal; Bar	Execution	9	5	5.25	8	5.50		
Horizontal; Bar	from apparatus	1	0.50	0.75	1	0.75		
Parallel; Bars	to apparatus	1	0.50	0.25	1	0.75		
Parallel; Bars	Execution	8	5	6.50	7.50	5		
Parallel; Bars	from apparatus	1	0.75	0.75	1	0.75		
Horse	to apparatus	1	0.75	0.50	1	0.75		
Horse	Execution	8.50	5	7.50	7	3.50		
Horse	from apparatus	1	0.50	0.75	0.50	0.75		
Free	Execution	6	4	5	6	3.50		
	Total	47.50	30.75	35	43	28.25	184.50	36.90

==== Italy ====
Apparatus	Execution	(Denmark) Clod-Hansen	(Italy) Tifi	(United Kingdom) Syson	(Germany) Wagner	(Hungary) Bély	Total	Average
Free	Carriage	1.75	2	1.50	1	2		
Free	Execution	9	9.50	8	8	9		
Horizontal; Bar	to apparatus	1	1	0.75	1	1		
Horizontal; Bar	Execution	9.50	9.50	8.25	9.50	8.25		
Horizontal; Bar	from apparatus	1	1	1	0.50	1		
Parallel; Bars	to apparatus	1	1	1	0.50	1		
Parallel; Bars	Execution	10	9.50	8.75	9.50	9.25		
Parallel; Bars	from apparatus	1	0.75	1	0.50	1		
Horse	to apparatus	1	1	1	1	1		
Horse	Execution	9.75	9.50	7.25	10	9		
Horse	from apparatus	1	1	1	1	1		
Free	Execution	10	10	8.50	10	10		
	Total	56	55.75	48	52.50	53.50	265.75	53.15

== Final standings ==
Place	Nation	Score
1	Italy Pietro Bianchi; Guido Boni; Alberto Braglia; Giuseppe Domenichelli; Carlo Fregosi; Alfredo Gollini; Francesco Loi; Luigi Maiocco; Giovanni Mangiante; Lorenzo Mangiante; Serafino Mazzarochi; Guido Romano; Paolo Salvi; Luciano Savorini; Adolfo Tunesi; Giorgio Zampori; Umberto Zanolini; Angelo Zorzi	53.15
2	Hungary József Bittenbinder; Imre Erdődy; Samu Fóti; Imre Gellért; Győző Haberfeld; Ottó Hellmich; István Herczeg; József Keresztessy; Lajos Kmetykó; János Krizmanich; Elemér Pászti; Árpád Pédery; Jenõ Rittich; Ferenc Szüts; Ödön Téry; Géza Tuli	45.45
3	Great Britain Albert Betts; William Cowhig; Sidney Cross; Harold Dickason; Herbert Drury; Bernard Franklin; Leonard Hanson; Samuel Hodgetts; Charles Luck; William MacKune; Ronald McLean; Alfred Messenger; Henry Oberholzer; Edward Pepper; Edward Potts; Reginald Potts; George Ross; Charles Simmons; Arthur Southern; William Titt; Charles Vigurs; Samuel Walker; John Whitaker	36.90
4	Luxembourg Nicolas Adam; Charles Behm; André Bordang; Michel Hemmerling; François Hentges; Pierre Hentges; Jean-Baptiste Horn; Nicolas Kanivé; Nicolas Kummer; Marcel Langsam; Emile Lanners; Jean-Pierre Thommes; François Wagner; Antoine Wehrer; Ferd Wirtz; Joseph Zuang	35.95
5	Germany Wilhelm Brülle; Johannes Buder; Walter Engelmann; Arno Glockauer; Walter Jesinghaus; Karl Jordan; Rudolf Körner; Heinrich Pahner; Kurt Reichenbach; Johannes Reuschle; Carl Richter; Hans Roth; Adolf Seebaß; Eberhard Sorge; Alex Sperling; Alfred Staats; Hans Werner; Martin Worm	32.40

== Sources ==
- The Official Report of the Olympic Games of Stockholm 1912. Stockholm: Wahlström & Widstrand. 1913.
- Wudarski, Pawel (1999). "Wyniki Igrzysk Olimpijskich" (in Polish).
