= British Gymnastics =

UK sports governing body

- Formation: 1888; 138 years ago
- Type: National sports governing body
- Legal status: Private Limited company without share capital (01630001)
- Purpose: Developing gymnasts, coaches and gymnastics clubs in the United Kingdom
- Headquarters: Lilleshall National Sports Centre
- Chairman: Mike Darcey
- CEO: Sarah Powell
- Patron: John Major
- Key people: Head of MAG: Barry Collie; Head of WAG: Martine George
- Subsidiaries: English Gymnastics; Welsh Gymnastics; Scottish Gymnastics; Gymnastics Northern Ireland
- Affiliations: European Union of Gymnastics; Fédération Internationale de Gymnastique; Central Council of Physical Recreation; British Olympic Association
- Website: British Gymnastics

British Gymnastics (BG) is the sports governing body for gymnastics disciplines in the United Kingdom including Acrobatic Gymnastics, Aerobic Gymnastics, Disability Gymnastics, Men’s Artistic Gymnastics, Rhythmic Gymnastics, TeamGym, Trampoline, Double Mini Tramp, Tumbling and Women’s Artistic Gymnastics.

It works in partnership with the Home Nations Gymnastics Associations: English Gymnastics, Gymnastics Northern Ireland, Scottish Gymnastics and Welsh Gymnastics.

== History ==
British Gymnastics was founded in 1888 as the Amateur Gymnastics and Fencing Association.

Walter Tysall became the first Briton to win an Olympic medal for gymnastics, achieving silver at the 1908 Olympics.

Women competed at the Olympics in gymnastics for the first time at the 1928 Olympics in Amsterdam, where the British women's team took the bronze – their best performance.

The 1960 Summer Olympics were the first to be televised, and this led to a greater interest in Britain of gymnastics.

In 1963 the Amateur Gymnastics Association became the British Amateur Gymnastics Association, and the BAGA first received a government grant, allowing it to pay coaches, and appoint a full-time national coach, Nik Stuart. He developed the BAGA Awards, a proficiency scheme for young gymnasts, which was adopted by seventy other countries.

The British men and women took part in their first ever Gymnastics World Championships in 1966 in Dortmund.

The BAGA Awards started to produce results for Britain. Gymnastics were given superstar status by the 1972 Olympics at Munich. Use of Lilleshall for gymnastics increased greatly throughout the late 1970s under Derek Tremayne.

BAGA was registered as a company on 20 April 1982. In 1979 the Sports Council had built a gym at Lilleshall, equipped to international standards in 1980, with the Queen Elizabeth Hall. In 1981 a £18,000 feasibility study looked at developing Lilleshall into a national centre, and in October 1982 the Sports Council allocated £1 million to develop a national centre.

Anne, Princess Royal opened the £1.75 million Princess Royal Hall at Lilleshall on 26 April 1988, paid for by the Sports Council. There is also the King George VI Hall and Ford Hall. In 1997 BAGA became British Gymnastics.

In 1998 UK Sport began awarding Lottery funding to British Gymnastics for the development of elite sport programmes.

British Gymnastics merges with the British Trampoline Federation in 1999 ahead of the 2000 Olympics.

In 2002 Beth Tweddle wins a bronze medal on bars at the European Championships – the first ever for a British women's artistic gymnast. She goes on to win the first World medal for a British Artistic Woman with another bronze on the bars at the 2003 World Championships. Tweddle then becomes the first British World Champion at the 2006 World Championships in Aarhus Denmark with a gold on bars.

At the 2008 Beijing Olympics, an individual Bronze for Louis Smith was a breakthrough with the first men's medal in decades.

At the 2012 London Olympics, the Men's Artistic Gymnastics team won Bronze with individual Silver for Louis Smith and Bronze for Max Whitlock on Pommel and individual Bronze for Beth Tweddle on Uneven bars.

At the 2020 Summer Olympics Jennifer Gadirova, Jessica Gadirova, Alice Kinsella and Amelie Morgan won Women's team Bronze.

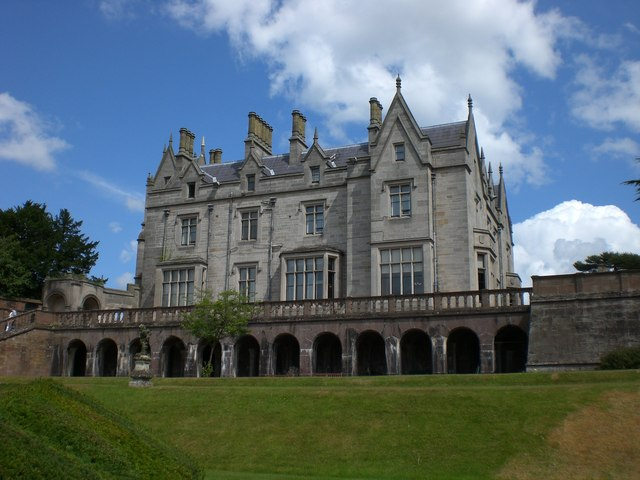
Lilleshall Hall

== Function ==
British Gymnastics is the main sport governing body for gymnastics throughout the UK, developing gymnasts, coaches clubs and officiating in all gymnastic disciplines. It aims to promote and regulate a safe and fair sport by setting standards for gymnastics clubs and affiliated organisations, competitions, and members.

=== Publications ===
Its main publication is The Gymnast, having been published since 1959. Since 2011 it has been released in an online format only Most news is now released via the British Gymnastics Website, Social Media and the weekly Gymblast email newsletter

== Competition ==
British Gymnastics holds the British Gymnastics Championships annually for elite-level artistic gymnasts, which also acts a selection event for the British national team.

== See also ==
- Whyte Review that detailed sexual, physical and emotional abuse in gymnastics in Britain
- Great Britain women's national gymnastics team
- Great Britain men's national artistic gymnastics team
