= Nik Stuart =

British gymnast (1927–2002)

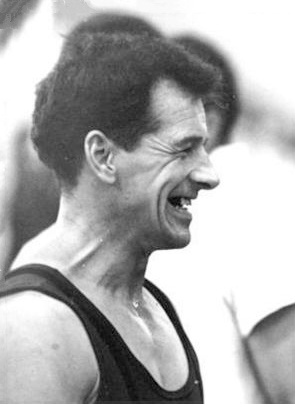
- Stuart in 1963

Personal information
- Full name: Wray Stuart
- Born: 20 July 1927 Thirsk, England
- Died: 24 June 2002 (aged 74)
- Height: 1.63 m (5 ft 4 in)

Gymnastics career
- Discipline: Men's artistic gymnastics
- Country represented: (United Kingdom) Great Britain
- Club: Army Gymnastics Union
Medal record
Representing Great Britain
European championships
Silver medal – second place	1957 Paris	Floor exericse

Wray "Nik" Stuart, MBE (20 July 1927 – 24 June 2002) was a British gymnast. He competed at the 1956 and 1960 Summer Olympics in all artistic gymnastics' events. His best achievement was 19th place all-around with the British team in 1960.

He was born the tenth child in a family of 12. In his teens he assisted his father, a plumber, and worked as a bricklayer. In 1946 he joined the army where he trained in boxing, diving and pole vaulting. Only in 1952, while stationed in Singapore, he became interested in gymnastics and later won nine consecutive British titles between 1956 and 1964. In 1962 he was appointed MBE for his achievements in sport. Two years later he left the army to become the head coach of the British gymnastics team. Between 1964 and 1989 he published about a dozen of books on training in artistic gymnastics. He retired in 1985 but continued to train himself and others at a local gym. The last two years of his life he suffered from Alzheimer's disease.

He married twice and had three children with his first wife, Edna. In 1987, he married second time, to Terry Liddle (née Henderson).
