= George Weedon (gymnast) =

British gymnast (1920–2017)

- Full name: George Gerald Weedon
- Born: 3 July 1920 Richmond, London, England
- Died: 22 February 2017 (aged 96) Southwell, Nottinghamshire, England
- Spouse: Joan Airey

Gymnastics career
- Discipline: Men's artistic gymnastics
- Country represented: (United Kingdom) Great Britain

George Gerald Weedon (3 July 1920 – 22 February 2017) was a British gymnast who competed at two Summer Olympic Games. In 1948 in London he participated in the Men's Individual All-Around, Team All-Around, Floor Exercise, Horse Vault, Parallel Bars, Horizontal Bar, Rings, and Pommelled Horse, placing 12th out of 16 nations in the team competition, and no higher than 38th individually. In 1952 in Helsinki he competed in the same events, finishing 21st out of 23 countries in the team tournament and no higher than 116th in the individual ones.

== Biography ==
Weedon was born in Richmond, London and was a member of the Regent Street Polytechnic Gymnastics Club. He married another British Olympic gymnast, Joan Airey, with whom he had three sons and one daughter. One grandchild, Lindsey Weedon, was a British representative modern pentathlete. Before and after retiring from active competition, he taught physical education at various schools including, from 1950 to 1971, the John Lyon School in Harrow on the Hill, Middlesex

In 2010 he was interviewed by the BBC about his experiences at the 1948 Games, in anticipation of the 2012 Summer Olympics to be held in London, and professed his belief that the city had not been properly prepared to host the earlier edition, due to its insufficient infrastructure. He was the subject of a 2011 short film, Walk Tall, by filmmaker Kate Sullivan. On 11 July 2012, he was a torchbearer during the 2012 Summer Olympics torch relay.

Weedon died in February 2017 after a short illness. A lifelong friend was fellow competitor Frank Turner.
