= Dick Gradley =

British gymnast (1932–2022)

- Full name: Richard Gradley
- Born: 6 March 1932 London, England
- Died: 10 September 2022 (aged 90)

Gymnastics career
- Discipline: Men's artistic gymnastics
- Country represented: (United Kingdom) Great Britain

Richard Gradley (6 March 1932 – 10 September 2022) was a British gymnast. He competed in eight events at the 1960 Summer Olympics.
