= Great Britain men's national artistic gymnastics team =

Great Britain men's national gymnastics team
- Continental union: European Gymnastics Union
- National federation: British Gymnastics
- Head coach: Barry Collie
- Training location: Lilleshall Hall

Olympic Games
- Appearances: 13
- Medals: Bronze: 1912, 2012

World Championships
- Medals: Silver: 2015; Bronze: 2022

European Championships
- Medals: Gold: 2012, 2022, 2025, 2026; Silver: 2010, 2014, 2016, 2018, 2024; Bronze: 2023

Junior World Championships
- Appearances: 3

The Great Britain men's national artistic gymnastics team represents Great Britain in FIG international competitions. The team has won two Olympic bronze medals in 1912 and 2012 and two World Championships medals, silver in 2015 and bronze in 2022.

== History ==
British gymnasts first competed at the Olympic Games in 1908. They won their first Olympic team medal, a bronze, at the 1912 Olympic Games. They would win their second team medal, another bronze, 100 years later at the 2012 Olympic Games. The first team medal at the World Championships came at the 2015 World Championships where the men took silver. They took a bronze at the 2022 World Championships.

== 2026 Senior Roster ==
Senior Squad
Name	Birthdate and age	Birthplace	Club
Adam Tobin	2 February 2001 (age 25)	Barnstaple, England	Notts Gymnastics Academy
Alex Yolshin-Cash	9 August 2005 (age 21)	Derby, England	Notts Gymnastics Academy
Cameron Lynn	26 April 2003 (age 23)	Scotland	West Lothian Artistic GC
Courtney Tulloch	6 October 1995 (age 31)	Maidstone, England	South Essex Gymnastics Club
Harry Hepworth	6 December 2003 (age 22)	England	Leeds Gymnastics Club
Jake Jarman	3 December 2001 (age 24)	Peterborough, England	Huntingdon Olympic Gymnastics Club
Jamie Lewis	2000	Guildford, England	Woking Gymnastics Club
Joe Fraser	6 December 1998 (age 27)	Birmingham, England	City of Birmingham Gym Club
Jonas Rushworth	2006	Leeds, England	Leeds Gymnastics Club
Joshua Nathan	25 September 1999 (age 27)	Nottingham, England	City of Birmingham Gym Club
Luke Whitehouse	2 July 2002 (age 24)	Halifax, England	Leeds Gymnastics Club
Max Whitlock	13 January 1993 (age 33)	Hemel Hempstead, England	South Essex Gymnastics Club
Remell Robinson-Bailey	2003	Birmingham, England	City of Birmingham Gym Club
Reuben Ward	19 July 2005 (age 21)	Manchester, England	Manchester Academy of Gymnastics
Sam Mostowfi	2002	Haywards Heath, England	Pegasus Gymnastics

Senior Development Squad
Name	Club
Alex Niscoveanu	South Essex Gymnastics Club
Elliot Vernon	Leeds Gymnastics Club
Gabriel Langton	City of Birmingham Gym Club
Jack Stanley	Leeds Gymnastics Club
Kieran Rockett	Europa Gym Centre CIC
Luke Marsh	Notts Gymnastics Academy
Michael Goddard	Leeds Gymnastics Club
Oakley Banks	Pegasus Gymnastics
Sol Scott	Huntingdon Olympic Gymnastics Club
Uzair Chowdhury	Huntingdon Olympic Gymnastics Club
Winston Powell	City of Birmingham Gym Club

== Team competition results ==
=== Olympic Games ===
Year	Position	Squad
1908	8th place	See team members
1912	Bronze	Albert Betts, William Cowhig, Sidney Cross, Harold Dickason, Herbert Drury, Bernard Franklin, Leonard Hanson, Samuel Hodgetts, Charles Luck, William MacKune, Ronald McLean, Alfred Messenger, Henry Oberholzer, Edward Pepper, Edward Potts, Reginald Potts, George Ross, Charles Simmons, Arthur Southern, William Titt, Charles Vigurs, Samuel Walker, John Whitaker
1920	5th place	Sidney Andrew, Albert Betts, Arthur Cocksedge, James Cotterell, William Cowhig, Sidney Cross, Horace Dawswell, J. E. Dingley, Sidney Domville, H. W. Doncaster, Reginald Edgecombe, Wyndham Edwards, Harry Finchett, Bernard Franklin, J. Harris, Samuel Hodgetts, Stanley Leigh, George Masters, Ronald McLean, Oliver Morris, Ted Ness, A. E. Page, Alfred Pinner, Teddy Pugh, H. W. Taylor, John Walker, Ralph Yandell
1924	6th place	Stanley Leigh, Harold Brown, Harry Finchett, Fred Hawkins, Thomas Hopkins, Ernest Leigh, Stan Humphreys, Alfred Spencer
1928	11th place	Arthur Whitford, E. W. Warren, Bert Cronin, E. A. Walton, T. B. Parkinson, Gilbert Raynes, Harry Finchett, Stan Humphreys
1948	12th place	George Weedon, Frank Turner, Ken Buffin, Alec Wales, Percy May, Jack Flaherty, Glyn Hopkins, Ivor Vice
1952	21st place	Ken Buffin, Graham Harcourt, Peter Starling, Frank Turner, George Weedon, Jack Whitford
1960	19th place	Ken Buffin, Dick Gradley, John Mulhall, Jack Pancott, Peter Starling, Nik Stuart
1984	9th place	Terry Bartlett, Carl Beynon Keith Langley, Andrew Morris, Eddie Van Hoof, Barry Winch
1988	—N/a	did not qualify a team
1992	12th place	Terence Bartlett, Paul Bowler, Marvin Campbell, David Cox, James Michael May, Neil Thomas
1996	—N/a	did not qualify a team
2000	—N/a	did not qualify a team
2004	—N/a	did not qualify a team
2008	—N/a	did not qualify a team
2012	Bronze	Sam Oldham, Daniel Purvis, Louis Smith, Kristian Thomas, Max Whitlock
2016	4th place	Brinn Bevan, Louis Smith, Kristian Thomas, Max Whitlock, Nile Wilson
2020	4th place	Joe Fraser, James Hall, Giarnni Regini-Moran, Max Whitlock
2024	4th place	Joe Fraser, Harry Hepworth, Jake Jarman, Luke Whitehouse, Max Whitlock

=== World Championships ===
Year	Position	Squad
2010	7th place	Kristian Thomas, Daniel Purvis, Samuel Hunter, Theo Seager, Ruslan Panteleymonov, Louis Smith
2011	10th place (Note: Did not qualify for team final)	Sam Oldham, Ruslan Panteleymonov, Daniel Purvis, Louis Smith, Kristian Thomas
2014	4th place	Dan Keatings, Daniel Purvis, Kristian Thomas, Courtney Tulloch, Max Whitlock, Nile Wilson
2015	Silver	Brinn Bevan, Daniel Purvis, Louis Smith, Kristian Thomas, Max Whitlock, Nile Wilson, James Hall
2018	5th place	Brinn Bevan, Dominick Cunningham, Joe Fraser, James Hall, Max Whitlock
2019	5th place	Dominick Cunningham, Joe Fraser, James Hall, Giarnni Regini-Moran, Max Whitlock
2022	Bronze	Joe Fraser, James Hall, Jake Jarman, Giarnni Regini-Moran, Courtney Tulloch, Adam Tobin
2023	4th place	James Hall, Harry Hepworth, Jake Jarman, Courtney Tulloch, Max Whitlock
2026	4th place	Joe Fraser, Harry Hepworth, Jake Jarman, Courtney Tulloch, Reuben Ward, Jonas Rushworth

=== European Championships ===
Year	Position	Squad
2004	17th place	Ross Brewer, David Eaton, Darren Gerrard, David Massam
2006	11th place	Ryan Bradley, Ross Brewer, Danny Lawrence
2008	9th place	Ross Brewer, Luke Folwell, Louis Smith, Kristian Thomas
2010	Silver	Daniel Purvis, Daniel Keatings, Louis Smith, Kristian Thomas, Samuel Hunter
2012	Gold	Ruslan Panteleymonov, Daniel Purvis, Louis Smith, Kristian Thomas, Max Whitlock
2014	Silver	Daniel Purvis, Daniel Keatings, Sam Oldham, Kristian Thomas, Max Whitlock
2016	Silver	Daniel Purvis, Louis Smith, Kristian Thomas, Courtney Tulloch, Nile Wilson
2018	Silver	Joe Fraser, James Hall, Max Whitlock, Courtney Tulloch, Dominick Cunningham
2020	DNP	Did not participate due to COVID-19 pandemic
2022	Gold	James Hall, Joe Fraser, Jake Jarman, Courtney Tulloch, Giarnni Regini-Moran
2023	Bronze	Jake Jarman, Joshua Nathan, Adam Tobin, Courtney Tulloch, Luke Whitehouse
2024	Silver	Joe Fraser, James Hall, Harry Hepworth, Jake Jarman, Courtney Tulloch
2025	Gold	Harry Hepworth, Jake Jarman, Jamie Lewis, Jonas Rushworth, Luke Whitehouse
2026	Gold	Joe Fraser, Jonas Rushworth, Harry Hepworth, Sol Scott, Courtney Tulloch

=== Junior World Championships ===
Year	Position	Squad
2019	14th place	Sam Mostowfi, Jasper Smith-Gordon, Luke Whitehouse
2023	7th place	George Atkins, Winston Powell, Alexander Yolshin-Cash
2025	5th place	Uzair Chowdhury, Evan McPhillips, Sol Scott

== Most decorated gymnasts ==
This list includes all British male artistic gymnasts who are global medalists; i.e. they have won medals at the Olympic Games or the World Artistic Gymnastics Championships combined.

Rank	Gymnast	Team	AA	FX	PH	SR	VT	PB	HB	Olympic Total	World Total	Total
1	Max Whitlock	2012; 2015	2016; 2014	2016; 2015	2016; 2020; 2012; 2015; 2017; 2019; 2013; 2018					6	8	14
2	Louis Smith	2012; 2015			2012; 2016; 2008; 2010; 2015; 2007; 2011					4	5	9
3	Jake Jarman	2022		2024; 2025; 2026			2023; 2026			1	5	6
4	Joe Fraser	2022	2026					2019	2025	0	4	4
5	Daniel Purvis	2012; 2015		2010						1	2	3
5	Kristian Thomas	2012; 2015					2013			1	2	3
7	Giarnni Regini-Moran	2022		2022						0	2	2
8	Neil Thomas			1993; 1994						0	2	2
9	James Hall	2015; 2022								0	2	2
9	Nile Wilson	2015							2016	1	1	2
11	Courtney Tulloch	2022				2022				0	2	2
12	Luke Whitehouse			2025						0	1	1
12	Brinn Bevan	2015								0	1	1
12	Dan Keatings		2009							0	1	1
15	Harry Hepworth						2024			0	1	1
15	Sam Oldham	2012								0	1	1

== Best international results ==
Event	TF	AA	FX	PH	SR	VT	PB	HB
Olympic Games	3rd place, bronze medalist(s)	3rd place, bronze medalist(s)	1st place, gold medalist(s)	1st place, gold medalist(s)	7	3rd place, bronze medalist(s)	8	3rd place, bronze medalist(s)
World Championships	2nd place, silver medalist(s)	2nd place, silver medalist(s)	1st place, gold medalist(s)	1st place, gold medalist(s)	3rd place, bronze medalist(s)	1st place, gold medalist(s)	1st place, gold medalist(s)	3rd place, bronze medalist(s)
European Games	8	13	2nd place, silver medalist(s)	3rd place, bronze medalist(s)		6	6	
European Championships	1st place, gold medalist(s)	1st place, gold medalist(s)	1st place, gold medalist(s)	1st place, gold medalist(s)	2nd place, silver medalist(s)	1st place, gold medalist(s)	1st place, gold medalist(s)	1st place, gold medalist(s)
Youth Olympics	3rd place, bronze medalist(s)	1st place, gold medalist(s)	1st place, gold medalist(s)	2nd place, silver medalist(s)		1st place, gold medalist(s)	3rd place, bronze medalist(s)	1st place, gold medalist(s)
Junior World Championships	5	6	8	4		2nd place, silver medalist(s)	6	6

== See also ==
- Great Britain women's national artistic gymnastics team
- List of Olympic male artistic gymnasts for Great Britain
