= William Titt =

Irish-born British gymnast (1881–1956)

- Full name: William Stephen Titt
- Born: 8 February 1881 Cork, Ireland
- Died: 5 May 1956 (aged 75) Cardiff, Wales

Gymnastics career
- Discipline: Men's artistic gymnastics
- Country represented: (United Kingdom) Great Britain
Medal record
Men's artistic gymnastics
Representing Great Britain
Olympic Games
Bronze medal – third place	1912 Stockholm	Team, European system

William Titt (8 February 1881 – 5 May 1956) was a British gymnast who competed in the 1908 Summer Olympics and in the 1912 Summer Olympics. He was born in Cork. Originally named William Lebeau, he took on the name of William Titt after his stepfather. When his stepfather died, he reverted to the original Lebeau. As a member of the British team in 1908, he finished eighth in the team competition. He was part of the British team, which won the bronze medal in the men's gymnastics team, European system event in 1912.
