= William Cowhig =

British artistic gymnast (1887–1964)

- Born: 5 April 1887 Maesteg, Wales
- Died: 16 August 1964 (aged 77) Rugby, Warwickshire, England

Gymnastics career
- Discipline: Men's artistic gymnastics
- Country represented: (United Kingdom) Great Britain
Medal record
Men's artistic gymnastics
Representing Great Britain
Olympic Games
Bronze medal – third place	1912 Stockholm	Team, European system

William Cowhig (5 April 1887 – 16 August 1964) was a British gymnast who competed at the 1908 Summer Olympics, the 1912 Summer Olympics and the 1920 Summer Olympics. He was part of the British team, which won the bronze medal in the gymnastics men's team, European system event in 1912. In the individual all-around competition he finished 29th. As a member of the British team in 1920 he finished fifth in the team, European system competition.
