= Cycling at the 1920 Summer Olympics – Men's team pursuit =

Men's team pursuit at the Games of the VII Olympiad
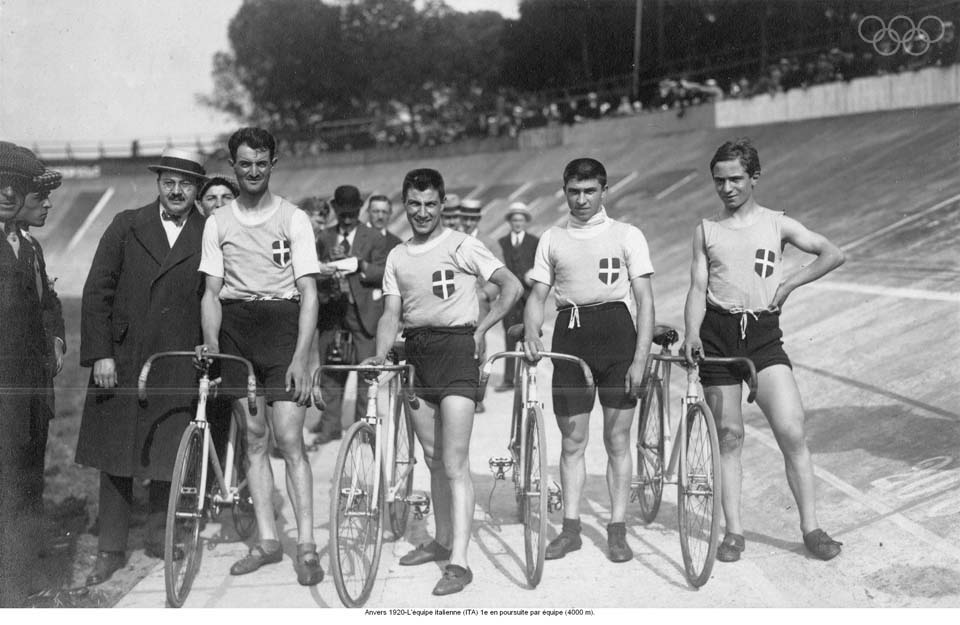
- The winning team from Italy (Giorgetti, Ferrario, Carli and Magnani)
- Venue: Vélodrome d'Anvers Zuremborg
- Dates: 9–10 August
- Competitors: 32 from 8 nations

Medalists
1st place, gold medalist(s)		Arnaldo Carli, Ruggero Ferrario, Franco Giorgetti, Primo Magnani; Italy
2nd place, silver medalist(s)		Cyril Alden, Horace Johnson, William Stewart, Albert White; Great Britain
3rd place, bronze medalist(s)		Sammy Goosen, Henry Kaltenbrunn, William Smith, James Walker; South Africa

The men's team pursuit event was part of the track cycling programme at the 1920 Summer Olympics.

== Results ==
=== Quarterfinals ===
Quarterfinal 1

Place	Cyclists	Time	Qual.
1	Italy, Arnaldo Carli, Ruggero Ferrario, Franco Giorgetti, Primo Magnani	6:20.0	Q
2	France, Georges Enguerrand, Henri Habent, Courder, Lucien Faucheux		

Quarterfinal 2

Place	Cyclists	Time	Qual.
1	Belgium, Bernard Janssens, Albert De Bunné, Charles Van Doorselaer, Gustave De Schryver	6:18.4	Q
2	United States, Christopher Dotterweich, Anthony Young, Willie Beck, Fred Taylor		

Quarterfinal 3

Place	Cyclists	Time	Qual.
1	Great Britain, Cyril Alden, Horace Johnson, William Stewart, Albert White	5:23.8	Q
2	Netherlands, Maurice Peeters, Frans de Vreng, Pieter Beets, Piet Ikelaar		

Quarterfinal 4

Place	Cyclists	Time	Qual.
1	South Africa, Sammy Goosen, Henry Kaltenbrunn, William Smith, James Walker	5:21.0	Q
2	Canada, Herbert McDonald, Harold Bounsall, Norman Webster, William Taylor		

=== Semifinals ===
Semifinal 1

Place	Cyclists	Time	Qual.
1	Great Britain, Cyril Alden, Horace Johnson, William Stewart, Albert White	5:14.0	Q
2	Belgium, Bernard Janssens, Albert De Bunné, Charles Van Doorselaer, Gustave De Schryver	5:20.2	

Semifinal 2

Place	Cyclists	Time	Qual.
1	Italy, Arnaldo Carli, Ruggero Ferrario, Franco Giorgetti, Primo Magnani	5:10.8	Q
2	South Africa, Sammy Goosen, Henry Kaltenbrunn, William Smith, James Walker	5:17.8	

=== Final ===
Italy took first place after a protest of the results of the final. No third place match was held between South Africa and Belgium; instead, their times in the semifinals were used to determine final placings.

Place	Cyclists	Time
1	Italy, Arnaldo Carli, Ruggero Ferrario, Franco Giorgetti, Primo Magnani	5:14.2
2	Great Britain, Cyril Alden, Horace Johnson, William Stewart, Albert White	5:13.8
