= Cycling at the 1920 Summer Olympics – Men's sprint =

Cycling at the Olympics

Men's sprint at the Games of the VII Olympiad
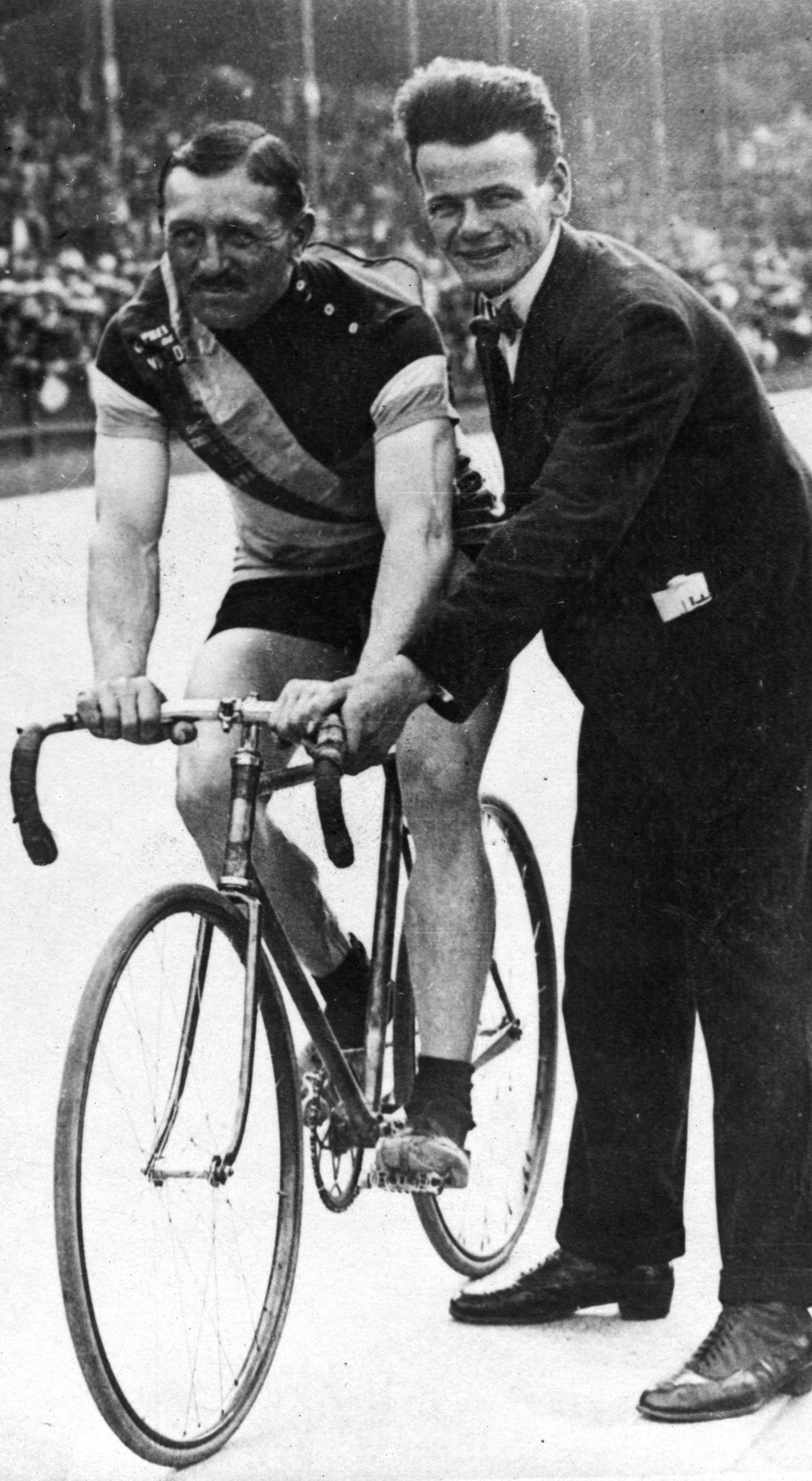
- Maurice Peeters after winning the gold medal
- Venue: Vélodrome d'Anvers Zuremborg
- Date: 9 August
- Competitors: 37 from 11 nations

Medalists
1st place, gold medalist(s)		Maurice Peeters; Netherlands
2nd place, silver medalist(s)		Thomas Johnson; Great Britain
3rd place, bronze medalist(s)		Harry Ryan; Great Britain

The men's sprint event was part of the track cycling programme at the 1920 Summer Olympics. There were 37 competitors from 11 nations, with each nation apparently limited to four cyclists (down from 12 the last time the event was held, in 1908). The event was won by Maurice Peeters of the Netherlands, the nation's first victory in the men's sprint. Two British cyclists, Thomas Johnson and Harry Ryan, were in the final as well, taking silver and bronze.

== Summary ==
One day before the Olympic tournament, Peeters had become amateur world champion in track cycling. One day later he rode the Olympic 1000 m sprint, and of course he was considered a favourite. He lost in the first round, but his second place was enough to progress to the next round. He then won the quarter final and the semi-final. In the final, he rode against two British cyclists, Harry Ryan and Tiny Johnson. They tried to make use of their numerical advantage, and Ryan attacked, so that Peeters had to get him back. In the final corner, Johnson tried to come around the corner to win the race, but Peeters was ahead and kept his lead. The British team protested the race, arguing that Peeters had obstructed Johnson by forcing him up the bank, but the protest was denied.

== Background ==
This was the fourth appearance of the event, which has been held at every Summer Olympics except 1904 and 1912. None of the finalists from 1908 returned. Peeters was the favorite.

Australia, Denmark, and Luxembourg each made their debut in the men's sprint. France made its fourth appearance, the only nation to have competed at every appearance of the event. For the first time, Germany did not compete in the men's sprint, having been excluded from the 1920 Games after World War I.

== Competition format ==
Unlike modern sprint events (which use a flying 200 metre time trial to cut down and seed the field, followed by one-on-one matches), the 1920 sprint used a competition format featuring four main rounds and a two-round repechage.

There were 12 first-round heats, mostly with three cyclists each but one with four. The top two in each heat advanced to the quarterfinals. The 24 quarterfinalists were divided into eight heats of three cyclists each; the winner of each quarterfinal advanced directly to the semifinals while the other two cyclists competed in the repechage. There were four repechage semifinals of four cyclists each, with the winner of each heat advancing to the repechage final. The four repechage finalists competed in a single heat, with the winner joining the eight quarterfinal winners in the semifinals. There were three semifinals of three cyclists each, with the winners advancing to the three-man final.

== Records ==
The records for the sprint are 200 metre flying time trial records, kept for the qualifying round in later Games as well as for the finish of races.

World record	Unknown	Unknown^{*}	Unknown	Unknown
Olympic record	Albert Taillandier (FRA)	12.6	Paris, France	13 September 1900

^{*} World records were not tracked by the UCI until 1954.

Thomas Johnson matched the Olympic record in heat 6, as did Gerald Halpin in heat 12. Halpin matched it again in quarterfinal 2. Johnson broke the record in the fifth quarterfinal, recording 11.8 seconds for the final 200 metres.

Albert White, Harry Ryan (cyclist), and Maurice Peeters also tied the old record, but after Johnson had set a new one.

== Schedule ==
Date	Time	Round
Monday, 9 August 1920	14:55	Round 1 Quarterfinals; Repechage semifinals Repechage final Semifinals; Final

== Results ==
=== Round 1 ===
==== Heat 1 ====
Rank	Cyclist	Nation	Time	Notes
1	Henri Bellivier	France	13.2	Q
2	Christopher Dotterweich	United States		Q
3	William Taylor	Canada		

==== Heat 2 ====
Rank	Cyclist	Nation	Time	Notes
1	Anthony Young	United States	13.2	Q
2	Maurice Peeters	Netherlands		Q
3	Pietro Martinelli	Italy		

==== Heat 3 ====
Rank	Cyclist	Nation	Time	Notes
1	Thomas Lance	Great Britain	13.2	Q
2	Binard	Belgium		Q
3	Jack King	Australia		

==== Heat 4 ====
Rank	Cyclist	Nation	Time	Notes
1	Léonard Daghelinckx	Belgium	13.2	Q
2	Norman Webster	Canada		Q
3	Tjabel Boonstra	Netherlands		

==== Heat 5 ====
Rank	Cyclist	Nation	Time	Notes
1	Harry Ryan	Great Britain	13.2	Q
2	L'Empereur	Belgium		Q
3	Jean Majérus	Luxembourg		

==== Heat 6 ====
Rank	Cyclist	Nation	Time	Notes
1	Thomas Johnson	Great Britain	12.6	Q, =OR
2	Piet Ikelaar	Netherlands		Q
3	Sammy Goosen	South Africa		

==== Heat 7 ====
Rank	Cyclist	Nation	Time	Notes
1	James Walker	South Africa	13.6	Q
2	Georges Paillard	France		Q
3	Vittorio Cavalotti	Italy		

==== Heat 8 ====
Rank	Cyclist	Nation	Time	Notes
1	Henry Andersen	Denmark	13.6	Q
2	George Thursfield	South Africa		Q
3	William Beck	United States		
4	Herbert McDonald	Canada		

==== Heat 9 ====
Rank	Cyclist	Nation	Time	Notes
1	Charles Lanusse	France	13.0	Q
2	Albert White	Great Britain		Q
3	Axel Hansen	Denmark		

==== Heat 10 ====
Rank	Cyclist	Nation	Time	Notes
1	Fred Taylor	United States	13.2	Q
2	Georges Perrin	France		Q
3	Armido Rizzetto	Italy		

==== Heat 11 ====
Rank	Cyclist	Nation	Time	Notes
1	John Verhoeven	Belgium	13.2	Q
2	Franco Giorgetti	Italy		Q
3	William Smith	South Africa		

==== Heat 12 ====
Rank	Cyclist	Nation	Time	Notes
1	Gerald Halpin	Australia	12.6	Q, =OR
2	Harold Bounsall	Canada		Q
3	Frans de Vreng	Netherlands		

=== Quarterfinals ===
==== Quarterfinal 1 ====
Rank	Cyclist	Nation	Time	Notes
1	Fred Taylor	United States	13.0	Q
2	Henri Bellivier	France		R
3	Norman Webster	Canada		R

==== Quarterfinal 2 ====
Rank	Cyclist	Nation	Time	Notes
1	Gerald Halpin	Australia	12.6	Q, =OR
2	Anthony Young	United States		R
3	L'Empereur	Belgium		R

==== Quarterfinal 3 ====
Rank	Cyclist	Nation	Time	Notes
1	George Thursfield	South Africa	13.2	Q
2	Christopher Dotterweich	United States		R
3	Thomas Lance	Great Britain		R

==== Quarterfinal 4 ====
Rank	Cyclist	Nation	Time	Notes
1	Maurice Peeters	Netherlands	13.2	Q
2	Harold Bounsall	Canada		R
3	John Verhoeven	Belgium		R

==== Quarterfinal 5 ====
Rank	Cyclist	Nation	Time	Notes
1	Thomas Johnson	Great Britain	11.8	Q, OR
2	Charles Lanusse	France		R
3	Piet Ikelaar	Netherlands		R

==== Quarterfinal 6 ====
Rank	Cyclist	Nation	Time	Notes
1	James Walker	South Africa	13.6	Q
2	Georges Perrin	France		R
3	Léonard Daghelinckx	Belgium		R

==== Quarterfinal 7 ====
Rank	Cyclist	Nation	Time	Notes
1	Albert White	Great Britain	12.6	Q
2	Henry Andersen	Denmark		R
3	Georges Paillard	France		R

==== Quarterfinal 8 ====
Rank	Cyclist	Nation	Time	Notes
1	Harry Ryan	Great Britain	12.8	Q
2	Franco Giorgetti	Italy		R
3	Binard	Belgium		R

=== Repechage ===
==== Repechage semifinals ====
===== Repechage semifinal 1 =====
Young finished first, but had cut off Bellivier and was penalized by dropping him to second place, eliminating him and allowing Bellivier to advance.

Rank	Cyclist	Nation	Time	Notes
1	Henri Bellivier	France		Q
2	Anthony Young	United States	13.2	
3	L'Empereur	Belgium		
4	Norman Webster	Canada		

===== Repechage semifinal 2 =====
Rank	Cyclist	Nation	Time	Notes
1	Charles Lanusse	France	13.0	Q
2	Henry Andersen	Denmark		
3	Georges Paillard	France		
4	Piet Ikelaar	Netherlands		

===== Repechage semifinal 3 =====
Rank	Cyclist	Nation	Time	Notes
1	Georges Perrin	France	12.8	Q
2	Léonard Daghelinckx	Belgium		
3	Binard	Belgium		
—	Franco Giorgetti	Italy	DNS	

===== Repechage semifinal 4 =====
Rank	Cyclist	Nation	Time	Notes
1	Harold Bounsall	Canada	13.4	Q
2	Christopher Dotterweich	United States		
3	John Verhoeven	Belgium		
4	Thomas Lance	Great Britain		

==== Repechage final ====
Rank	Cyclist	Nation	Time	Notes
1	Pierre Lanousse	France	13.0	Q
2	Harold Bounsall	Canada		
3	Georges Perrin	France		
4	Henri Bellivier	France		

=== Semifinals ===
==== Semifinal 1 ====
Rank	Cyclist	Nation	Time	Notes
1	Thomas Johnson	Great Britain	14.8	Q
2	George Thursfield	South Africa	15.2	
3	Albert White	Great Britain	15.3	

==== Semifinal 2 ====
Rank	Cyclist	Nation	Time	Notes
1	Harry Ryan	Great Britain	12.6	Q
2	Fred Taylor	United States	15.2	
3	Gerald Halpin	Australia	15.2	

==== Semifinal 3 ====
Rank	Cyclist	Nation	Time	Notes
1	Maurice Peeters	Netherlands	12.6	Q
2	Pierre Lanousse	France	15.2	
3	James Walker	South Africa	15.2	

=== Final ===
Rank	Cyclist	Nation	Time
1st place, gold medalist(s)	Maurice Peeters	Netherlands	13.0
2nd place, silver medalist(s)	Thomas Johnson	Great Britain	15.1
3rd place, bronze medalist(s)	Harry Ryan	Great Britain	15.1

== Notes ==
- Belgium Olympic Committee (1957). Olympic Games Antwerp 1920: Official Report (in French).
- Wudarski, Pawel (1999). "Wyniki Igrzysk Olimpijskich" (in Polish). Archived from the original on 16 February 2009.
