= Cycling at the 1920 Summer Olympics – Men's 50 kilometres =

Cycling at the Olympics

Men's 50 kilometres at the Games of the VII Olympiad
- Venue: Vélodrome d'Anvers Zuremborg
- Date: 10 August
- Competitors: 31 from 10 nations

Medalists
1st place, gold medalist(s)		Henry George	Belgium
2nd place, silver medalist(s)		Cyril Alden	Great Britain
3rd place, bronze medalist(s)		Piet Ikelaar	Netherlands

The men's 50 kilometres event was part of the track cycling programme at the 1920 Summer Olympics.

== Results ==
Place	Cyclist	Time
1	Henry George (BEL)	1:16:43.2
2	Cyril Alden (GBR)	
3	Piet Ikelaar (NED)	
4	Ruggero Ferrario (ITA)	
5	Herbert McDonald (CAN)	
6	Franco Giorgetti (ITA)	
7	William Smith (RSA)	
8	Charles Cadron (BEL)	
8	Gaston Alancourt (FRA)	
8	Gustave De Schryver (BEL)	
8	William Stewart (GBR)	
8	Primo Magnani (ITA)	
8	Thomas Harvey (GBR)	
—	Jack King (AUS)	DNF
—	Félix Dockx (BEL)	DNF
—	Harold Bounsall (CAN)	DNF
—	William Taylor (CAN)	DNF
—	Norman Webster (CAN)	DNF
—	Courder (FRA)	DNF
—	Georges Enguerrand (FRA)	DNF
—	Horace Johnson (GBR)	DNF
—	Luigi Gilardi (ITA)	DNF
—	Jean Majérus (LUX)	DNF
—	Arie van der Stel (NED)	DNF
—	Anton Krijgsman (NED)	DNF
—	Willem Ooms (NED)	DNF
—	James Walker (RSA)	DNF
—	Fred Taylor (USA)	DNF
—	William Beck (USA)	DNF
—	Frank Small (USA)	DNF
—	Anthony Young (USA)	DNF
