= Cycling at the 1920 Summer Olympics – Men's tandem =

Cycling at the Olympics

Men's tandem at the Games of the VII Olympiad
- Venue: Vélodrome d'Anvers Zuremborg
- Dates: 9–10 August
- Competitors: 22 from 6 nations

Medalists
| 1st place, gold medalist(s) | | Thomas Lance, Harry Ryan; Great Britain |
| 2nd place, silver medalist(s) | | William Smith, James Walker; South Africa |
| 3rd place, bronze medalist(s) | | Frans de Vreng and Piet Ikelaar; Netherlands |

The men's tandem event was part of the track cycling programme at the 1920 Summer Olympics.

== Results ==
=== Quarterfinals ===
==== Quarterfinal 1 ====
| Place | Cyclists | Time | Qual. |
|---|---|---|---|
| 1 | Piet Ikelaar and Frans de Vreng (NED) | 12.6 | Q |
| 2 | Henry Andersen and Axel Hansen (DEN) | | |
| 3 | William Ormston and Herbert Lee (GBR) | | |

==== Quarterfinal 2 ====
| Place | Cyclists | Time | Qual. |
|---|---|---|---|
| 1 | William Smith and James Walker (RSA) | 13.0 | Q |
| 2 | John Verhoeven and Léonard Daghelinckx (BEL) | | |
| 3 | Pieter Beets and Tjabel Boonstra (NED) | | |

==== Quarterfinal 3 ====
| Place | Cyclists | Time | Qual. |
|---|---|---|---|
| 1 | Harry Ryan and Thomas Lance (GBR) | 12.0 | Q |
| 2 | Sammy Goosen and George Thursfield (RSA) | | |
| 3 | Henri Bellivier and Georges Perrin (FRA) | | |

==== Quarterfinal 4 ====
| Place | Cyclists | Time | Qual. |
|---|---|---|---|
| 1 | William Stewart and Cyril Alden (GBR) | 15.6 | Q |
| 2 | Frans Verschueren and Frédéric Claessens (BEL) | DNF | |

=== Semifinals ===
Semifinal 1

| Place | Cyclists | Time | Qual. |
|---|---|---|---|
| 1 | Harry Ryan and Thomas Lance (GBR) | 11.6 | Q |
| 2 | Piet Ikelaar and Frans de Vreng (NED) | | |

Semifinal 2

| Place | Cyclists | Time | Qual. |
|---|---|---|---|
| 1 | William Smith and James Walker (RSA) | 12.6 | Q |
| 2 | William Stewart and Cyril Alden (GBR) | | |

=== Final ===
| Place | Cyclists | Time |
|---|---|---|
| 1 | Harry Ryan and Thomas Lance (GBR) | 11.2 |
| 2 | William Smith and James Walker (RSA) | |

=== Bronze medal match ===
| Place | Cyclists | Time |
|---|---|---|
| 3 | Piet Ikelaar and Frans de Vreng (NED) | |
| 4 | William Stewart and Cyril Alden (GBR) | DNF |
