= Olympic record progression track cycling – Men's team pursuit =

This is an overview of the progression of the Olympic track cycling record of the men's 4000 m team pursuit, as recognised by the Union Cycliste Internationale (UCI).

The men's team pursuit was introduced at the 1908 Summer Olympics and with the 4000 m distance at the 1920 Summer Olympics. Strangely the UCI list the first Olympic record as of 1992 although the event has already been contested at several Olympic Games before.

== Progression ==
♦ denotes a performance that is also a current world record. Statistics are correct as of the 6th of August 2024.

| Time | Cyclists | Location | Track | Date | Meet | Ref |
|---|---|---|---|---|---|---|
| 6:18.4* | Belgium; Bernard Janssens; Albert De Bunné; Charles Van Doorselaer; Gustave De Schryver | Antwerp (BEL), Vélodrome d'Anvers Zuremborg | | 9 August 1920 | 1920 Summer Olympics; Quarter finals | |
| 5:10.8* | Italy; Arnaldo Carli; Ruggero Ferrario; Franco Giorgetti; Primo Magnani | Antwerp (BEL), Vélodrome d'Anvers Zuremborg | | August 1920 | 1920 Summer Olympics; Semifinals | |
| 5:01.6* | Great Britain; Harry Wyld; Lew Wyld; Percy Wyld; Monty Southall | Amsterdam (NED), Olympisch Stadion | | 5 August 1928 | 1928 Summer Olympics; Quarter finals | |
| 4:52.9* | Italy; Marco Cimatti; Paolo Pedretti; Alberto Ghilardi; Nino Borsari | Los Angeles (USA), Rose Bowl | | 2 August 1932 | 1932 Summer Olympics; Qualifying | |
| 4:41.8* | France; Robert Charpentier; Jean Goujon; Guy Lapébie; Roger Le Nizerhy | Berlin (GER) | | 2 August 1936 | 1936 Summer Olympics; Qualifying | |
| 4:38.4* | Italy | Melbourne (AUS), Olympic Park Velodrome | | 4 December 1956 | 1956 Summer Olympics; Semifinals | |
| 4:37.4* | Italy | Melbourne (AUS), Olympic Park Velodrome | | 4 December 1956 | 1956 Summer Olympics; Gold medal race | |
| 4:29.32* | United Team of Germany; Siegfried Köhler; Peter Gröning; Manfred Klieme; Bernd Barleben | Rome (ITA), Olympic Velodrome | | 27 August 1960 | 1960 Summer Olympics; Quarter finals | |
| 4:28.88* | Italy; Luigi Arienti; Franco Testa; Mario Vallotto; Marino Vigna | Rome (ITA), Olympic Velodrome | | 29 August 1960 | 1960 Summer Olympics; Semifinals | |
| 4:16.10* | Italy | Mexico City (MEX), Agustín Melgar Olympic Velodrome | | 19 October 1968 | 1968 Summer Olympics; Qualifying | |
| 4:15.76* | West Germany | Mexico City (MEX), Agustín Melgar Olympic Velodrome | | 20 October 1968 | 1968 Summer Olympics; Semifinals | |
| 4:14.64* | Soviet Union | Moscow (URS), Olympic Velodrome | | 25 July 1980 | 1980 Summer Olympics; Qualifying | |
| 4:14.22* | Soviet Union; Viatcheslav Ekimov; Artūras Kasputis; Dmitry Nelyubin; Gintautas Umaras | Seoul (KOR) | | 23 September 1988 | 1988 Summer Olympics; Quarter finals | |
| 4:13.31* | Soviet Union; Viatcheslav Ekimov; Artūras Kasputis; Dmitry Nelyubin; Gintautas Umaras | Seoul (KOR) | | 24 September 1988 | 1988 Summer Olympics; Gold medal race | |
| 4:11.245* | Australia; Brett Aitken; Stephen McGlede; Shaun O’Brien; Stuart O'Grady | Barcelona (ESP) | Open air track | 30 July 1992 | 1992 Summer Olympics; Qualifying | |
| 4:10.438* | Australia; Brett Aitken; Stephen McGlede; Shaun O’Brien; Stuart O'Grady | Barcelona (ESP) | Open air track | 30 July 1992 | 1992 Summer Olympics; Quarter finals | |
| 4:08.791 | Germany; Michael Glockner; Jens Lehmann; Stefan Steinweg; Guido Fulst | Barcelona (ESP) | Open air track | 31 July 1992 | 1992 Summer Olympics; Gold medal race | |
| 4:08.785* | Russia; Eduard Gritsun; Nikolay Kuznetsov; Aleksey Markov; Anton Chantyr | Atlanta (USA) | Open air track | 26 July 1996 | 1996 Summer Olympics; Quarter finals | |
| 4:06.880* | France; Christophe Capelle; Philippe Ermenault; Jean-Michel Monin; Francis Moreau | Atlanta (USA) | Open air track | 27 July 1996 | 1996 Summer Olympics; Semifinals | |
| 4:05.930 | France; Christophe Capelle; Philippe Ermenault; Jean-Michel Monin; Francis Moreau | Atlanta (USA) | Open air track | 27 July 1996 | 1996 Summer Olympics; Gold medal race | |
| 4:04.030* | Great Britain; Bryan Steel; Paul Manning; Bradley Wiggins; Chris Newton | Sydney (AUS) | Indoor track | 18 September 2000 | 2000 Summer Olympics; Qualifying | |
| 4:01.810* | Germany; Guido Fulst; Robert Bartko; Daniel Becke; Jens Lehmann | Sydney (AUS) | Indoor track | 18 September 2000 | 2000 Summer Olympics; Quarter finals | |
| 4:00.830* | Ukraine; Oleksandr Fedenko; Oleksandr Symonenko; Sergiy Matveyev; Sergiy Chernyavskyy | Sydney (AUS) | Indoor track | 19 September 2000 | 2000 Summer Olympics; Semifinals | |
| 3:59.710 | Germany; Guido Fulst; Robert Bartko; Daniel Becke; Jens Lehmann | Sydney (AUS) | Indoor track | 19 September 2000 | 2000 Summer Olympics; Gold medal race | |
| 3:56.610 | Australia; Luke Roberts; Brett Lancaster; Brad Mcgee; Graeme Brown | Athens (GRE) | Indoor track | 22 August 2004 | 2004 Summer Olympics; Semifinals | |
| 3:55.202* | Great Britain; Edward Clancy; Paul Manning; Thomas Geraint; Bradley Wiggins | Beijing (CHN) | Indoor track | 18 August 2008 | 2008 Summer Olympics; Semifinals | |
| 3:53.314 | Great Britain; Edward Clancy; Paul Manning; Thomas Geraint; Bradley Wiggins | Beijing (CHN) | Indoor track | 18 August 2008 | 2008 Summer Olympics; Gold medal race | |
| 3:52.499* | Great Britain; Edward Clancy; Geraint Thomas; Steven Burke; Peter Kennaugh | London (GBR), London Velopark | Indoor track | 2 August 2012 | 2012 Summer Olympics; Qualifying | |
| 3:51.659 | Great Britain; Edward Clancy; Geraint Thomas; Steven Burke; Peter Kennaugh | London (GBR), London Velopark | Indoor track | 3 August 2012 | 2012 Summer Olympics; Gold medal race | |
| 3:50.570 | Great Britain; Edward Clancy; Owain Doull; Steven Burke; Bradley Wiggins | Rio de Janeiro (BRA) | Indoor track | 12 August 2016 | 2016 Olympics First round | |
| 3:50.265 | Great Britain; Edward Clancy; Owain Doull; Steven Burke; Bradley Wiggins | Rio de Janeiro (BRA) | Indoor track | 12 August 2016 | 2016 Olympics Gold medal race | |
| 3:45.895 | Italy; Simone Consonni; Filippo Ganna; Francesco Lamon; Jonathan Milan | (Japan) Izu Velodrome, Izu | Indoor track | 2 August 2021 | 2020 Olympics Qualifying | |
| 3:45.014 | Denmark; Lasse Norman Hansen; Niklas Larsen; Frederik Rodenberg; Rasmus Pedersen | (Japan) Izu Velodrome, Izu | Indoor track | 2 August 2021 | 2020 Olympics Qualifying | |
| 3:42.307 | Italy; Simone Consonni; Filippo Ganna; Francesco Lamon; Jonathan Milan | (Japan) Izu Velodrome, Izu | Indoor track | 3 August 2021 | 2020 Olympics First round | |
| 3:42.032 | Italy; Simone Consonni; Filippo Ganna; Francesco Lamon; Jonathan Milan | (Japan) Izu Velodrome, Izu | Indoor track | 4 August 2021 | 2020 Olympics Finals | |
| ♦3:40.730 | Australia; Oliver Bleddyn; Sam Welsford; Conor Leahy; Kelland O'Brien | (France) Vélodrome National, Saint-Quentin-en-Yvelines | Indoor track | 6 August 2024 | 2024 Olympic Games | |

* Not listed by the UCI as an Olympic record
