= Masciago =

Masciago may refer to:

- Bovisio-Masciago, municipality in the Province of Monza and Brianza in the Italian region Lombardy
- Masciago Primo, municipality in the Province of Varese in the Italian region Lombardy
- Masciago Milanese, frazioni of Bovisio Masciago
