= Henry Andersen =

Henry Andersen may refer to:

- Henry Brask Andersen (1896–1970), Danish amateur track cyclist
- Henry Andersen (speedway rider) (1926–1999), Norwegian speedway rider
