= Cycling at the 1920 Summer Olympics =

Cycling at the Games of the VII Olympiad
- Venues: Antwerp and surrounding area Vélodrome d'Anvers Zuremborg
- Date: 9 –13 August 1920
- Competitors: 103 from 14 nations

The cycling competitions at the 1920 Summer Olympics in Antwerp consisted of two road racing events and four track racing events, all for men only. The 50 km track event was held for the first time at these Games.

== Medal summary ==
=== Road cycling ===
| Games | Gold | Silver | Bronze |
|---|---|---|---|
| Individual time trial | Harry Stenqvist; Sweden | Henry Kaltenbrun; South Africa | Fernand Canteloube; France |
| Team time trial | France; Achille Souchard; Fernand Canteloube; Georges Detreille; Marcel Gobillot | Sweden; Harry Stenqvist; Sigfrid Lundberg; Ragnar Malm; Axel Persson | Belgium; Albert Wyckmans; Albert De Bunné; Bernard Janssens; André Vercruysse |

=== Track cycling ===
| Games | Gold | Silver | Bronze |
|---|---|---|---|
| Sprint | Maurice Peeters; Netherlands | Horace Johnson; Great Britain | Harry Ryan; Great Britain |
| 50 kilometres | Henry George; Belgium | Cyril Alden; Great Britain | Piet Ikelaar; Netherlands |
| Tandem | Thomas Lance and Harry Ryan; Great Britain | William Smith and James Walker; South Africa | Frans de Vreng and Piet Ikelaar; Netherlands |
| Team pursuit | Italy; Primo Magnani; Arnaldo Carli; Ruggerio Ferrario; Franco Giorgetti | Great Britain; Albert White; Cyril Alden; Horace Johnson; William Stewart | South Africa; James Walker; Sammy Goosen; Henry Kaltenbrun; William Smith |

== Participating nations ==
A total of 103 cyclists from 14 nations competed at the Antwerp Games.

- Australia (2)
- Belgium (15)
- Canada (5)
- Czechoslovakia (4)
- Denmark (6)
- France (13)
- Great Britain (13)

- Italy (12)
- Luxembourg (1)
- Netherlands (10)
- Norway (4)
- South Africa (5)
- Sweden (4)
- United States (9)

== Medal table ==
| Rank | Nation | Gold | Silver | Bronze | Total |
|---|---|---|---|---|---|
| 1 | Great Britain | 1 | 3 | 1 | 5 |
| 2 | Sweden | 1 | 1 | 0 | 2 |
| 3 | Netherlands | 1 | 0 | 2 | 3 |
| 4 | Belgium | 1 | 0 | 1 | 2 |
| 4 | France | 1 | 0 | 1 | 2 |
| 6 | Italy | 1 | 0 | 0 | 1 |
| 7 | South Africa | 0 | 2 | 1 | 3 |
| Totals (7 entries) | | 6 | 6 | 6 | 18 |
