= Luigi Maria Monti =

Italian religious brother (1825–1900)

Blessed Luigi Maria Monti CFIC
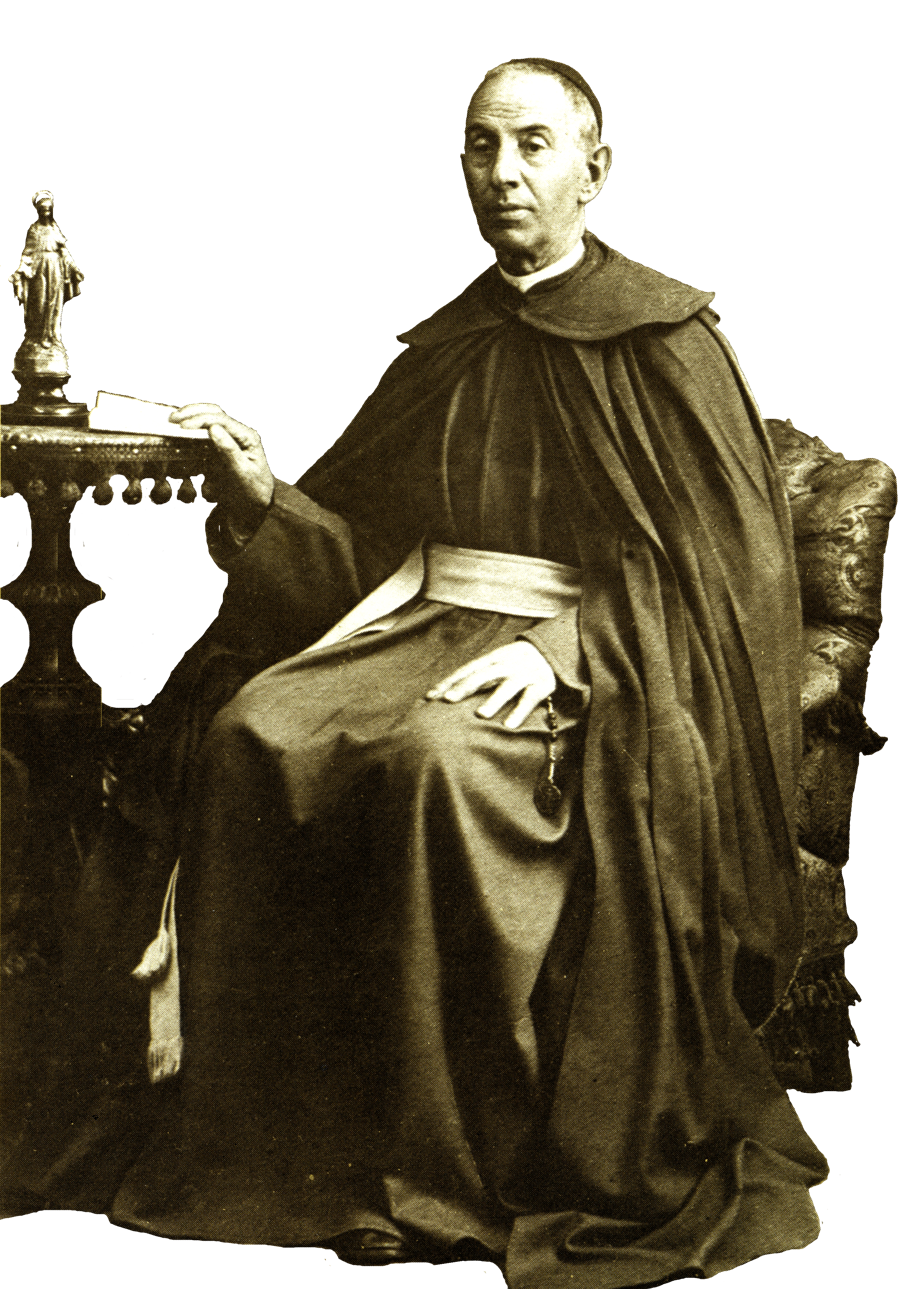

Religious
- Born: 24 July 1825; Bovisio Masciago, Milan, Kingdom of Lombardy–Venetia
- Died: 1 October 1900 (aged 75); Saronno, Varese, Kingdom of Lombardy–Venetia
- Venerated in: Roman Catholic Church
- Beatified: 9 November 2003, Saint Peter's Square, Vatican City by Pope John Paul II
- Feast: 22 September (Milan); 1 October
- Patronage: Sons of the Immaculate Conception

Luigi Maria Monti, CFIC (24 July 1825 – 1 October 1900) was an Italian Catholic religious brother and the founder of the Sons of the Immaculate Conception.

He was referred to as "Father" despite not being an ordained priest. Monti served as a nurse for most of his life and aided the ill in the Santo Spirito hospital in Rome while he was there and also worked to tend to ill people during the Brescia cholera epidemic in 1855. Monti also considered entering the religious life and joined the order of Lodovico Pavoni for a brief period of time.

The beatification cause for opened under Pope Pius XII in 1941 and he became titled as a Servant of God, the first stage in the process for sainthood. Pope John Paul II named him as Venerable on 24 April 2001 on the account of his heroic virtue and later beatified him at St. Peter's Square on 9 November 2003.

== Life ==
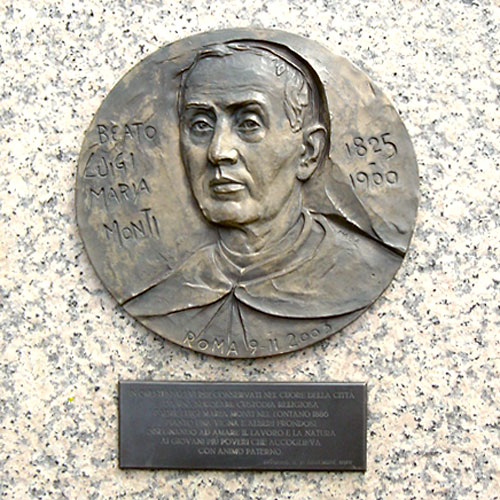
Monti's gravestone.

Luigi Maria Monti was born in 1825 in Milan as the eighth of eleven children to Angelo (d. 1837) and Teresa Monti. His father died when Monti was twelve.

Monti formed a small group of craftsman and farmers at the store he managed devoted to the Sacred Heart. He made a private vow of obedience and to remain chaste to God on 8 December 1846. He and the other members of his group were charged with meeting to conspire against the Austrian forces who were in the area and in 1851 were jailed in Milan for ten weeks. The group was released when it became obvious that the latter was a religious group and not a political one; the Cardinal Archbishop of Milan Bartolomeo Carlo Romilli also intervened to secure their release. His spiritual director became the priest Luigi Dossi and the two first met in September 1843.

He enlisted in the order that Lodovico Pavoni founded in 1830 and spent six weeks with them as a novice while he studied to become a nurse. He aided the ill during the cholera epidemic in Brescia in 1855 and - with the aid of Dossi - began to set the foundations for a religious order he wished to establish to aid the sick and founded it on 8 September 1857.

Monti and his fellow nurse Cipriano Pezzini moved to Rome in 1858 where the two commenced work at the hospital of Santo Spirito. He worked alongside the Order of Friars Minor Capuchin for a brief period of time while in Rome. Monti became certified as a nurse with a diploma at the La Sapienza college. Pope Pius IX, on 4 March 1877, blessed Monti's work and appointed him as its Superior General. This was a position that he held until his death.

The pope desired Monti's order to be aggregated to the Capuchin order - since Monti worked with them for a brief period of time - but Cardinal Luigi Bilio sent a letter to Giovanni Bosco on the pope's behalf requesting that the Salesians of Don Bosco aggregate the order. Pius IX noted that Monti opposed this and so decided the order would not be aggregated at all.

The religious left Rome in 1886 and moved to Saronno. In 1882 he met a Carthusian monk who came to see him at the hospital in Rome and at his request assumed care for his four parentless nephews; he opened a home for them at Saronno after he arrived there.

Monti died on 1 October 1900 almost blind. His order received papal approval from Pope Pius X in 1904 and his remains were later relocated on 22 September 1940.

== Beatification ==
The beatification process commenced in Milan in 1941 in an informative process that Cardinal Alfredo Ildefonso Schuster opened and later concluded in 1950. The investigation into his spiritual writings began on 7 June 1951, and the writings were approved on 8 February 1963. The Congregation for the Causes of Saints validated the process on 16 June 1989 and then received the Positio dossier in 1993. Theologians approved the cause on 13 June 2000 as did the C.C.S. on 6 February 2001 and it allowed for Pope John Paul II to confirm her heroic virtue and name her as Venerable on 24 April 2001.

The process for a miracle spanned from 1964 until 1978 and the miracle in question involved the cure of Giovanni Luigi Iecle - who suffered from an intestinal condition - on 26 December 1961 in Bosa in Nuoro. This process was validated on 1 July 1994 and received the approval of a medical board on 21 February 2002. Theologians approved it as well on 18 October 2002 as did the C.C.S. on 21 January 2003. John Paul II approved the miracle on 12 April 2003 and later beatified Monti on 9 November 2003 in Saint Peter's Square.

The current postulator for this cause is Giovanni Cazzaniga.
