= William Ormston =

British cyclist (1895–1950)

Personal information
- Born: 12 August 1895
- Died: 1950 (aged 54–55)

Cycling career
- Sport: Cycling

William Ormston (12 August 1895 – 1950) was a British cyclist. He competed in the men's tandem event at the 1920 Summer Olympics.
