= Frank Small (cyclist) =

American cyclist

Personal information
- Born: April 18, 1895 Brooklyn, New York, United States
- Died: January 1971 Queens, New York, United States

Cycling career
- Sport: Cycling

Frank Small (April 18, 1895 – January 1971) was an American cyclist. He competed in the men's 50km event at the 1920 Summer Olympics.
