= Armido Rizzetto =

Italian cyclist

Personal information
- Born: 23 March 1893 Este, Italy
- Died: 5 June 1956 (aged 63)

Cycling career
- Sport: Cycling

Armido Rizzetto (23 March 1893 – 5 June 1956) was an Italian cyclist. He competed in the men's sprint at the 1920 Summer Olympics. He was also a two-time amateur national champion.
