= Frans Verschueren =

Belgian cyclist

Personal information
- Full name: Frans Verschueren

Cycling career
- Sport: Cycling

Frans Verschueren was a Belgian cyclist. He competed in the men's tandem event at the 1920 Summer Olympics.
