= L'Empereur (cyclist) =

Belgian cyclist

Personal information
- Full name: L'Empereur

Cycling career
- Sport: Cycling

L'Empereur was a Belgian cyclist. He competed in the men's sprint event at the 1920 Summer Olympics.
