= Gerald Halpin =

Australian cyclist

Personal information
- Born: 15 June 1896 Rookwood, New South Wales, Australia
- Died: 9 June 1944 (aged 47) Glebe, New South Wales, Australia

Cycling career
- Sport: Cycling

Gerald Halpin (15 June 1896 – 9 June 1944) was an Australian cyclist. He competed in the men's sprint event at the 1920 Summer Olympics. He won Australian half mile title and was selected in Australian team. Gerald died in Glebe NSW, Australia.
