= Anton Krijgsman =

Dutch cyclist

Personal information
- Born: 5 May 1898 The Hague, Netherlands
- Died: 1 May 1974 (aged 75) Voorburg, Netherlands

Cycling career
- Sport: Cycling

Anton Krijgsman (5 May 1898 – 1 May 1974) was a Dutch cyclist. He competed in the men's 50km event at the 1920 Summer Olympics.

== See also ==
- List of Dutch Olympic cyclists
