= Henry George (cyclist) =

Belgian cyclist

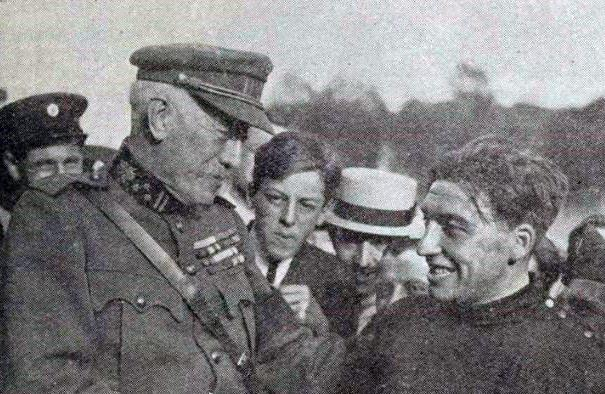
- George (right) being congratulated after winning gold at the 1920 Summer Olympics

Personal information
- Born: 18 February 1891 Charleroi, Belgium
- Died: 6 January 1976 (aged 84) Uccle, Belgium

Cycling career
- Sport: Cycling
- Discipline: Track cycling
- Role: Rider

Professional team
- 1920: Belgian Olympic Cycling Team
Medal record
Representing Belgium
Men's track cycling
Olympic Games
| Gold medal – first place | 1920 Antwerp | 50 kilometres |

Henry George (18 February 1891 – 6 January 1976) was a Belgian track cycling racer who competed in the 1920 Summer Olympics.

During the First World War, George served in the Belgian Army. He was part of the Belgian Expeditionary Corps in Russia, fighting on the Eastern Front along with Imperial Russian forces against the advancing forces of the Central Powers.

In 1920, at the Antwerp Summer Olympics, he won the gold medal in the 50 kilometres cycling competition.
