= Charles Lanusse =

French cyclist

Personal information
- Born: 25 August 1896 Bordeaux, France
- Died: 14 February 1976 (aged 79)

Cycling career
- Sport: Cycling

Charles Lanusse (25 August 1896 – 14 February 1976) was a French cyclist. He competed in the men's sprint event at the 1920 Summer Olympics.
