= Félix Dockx =

Belgian cyclist

Personal information
- Full name: Félix Josephus Baptista Dockx
- Born: 11 June 1887 Borgerhout, Belgium
- Died: 5 September 1961 (aged 74) Wijnegem, Belgium

Cycling career
- Sport: Cycling

Félix Dockx (11 June 1887 – 5 September 1961) was a Belgian cyclist. He competed in the men's 50 km event at the 1920 Summer Olympics.
