= Luigi Gilardi =

Italian cyclist

Personal information
- Born: 12 August 1897 Pezzana, Italy
- Died: 21 July 1987 (aged 89)

Cycling career
- Sport: Cycling

Luigi Gilardi (12 August 1897 – 21 July 1987) was an Italian cyclist. He competed in the men's 50km event at the 1920 Summer Olympics.
