= Frédéric Claessens =

Belgian cyclist

Personal information
- Full name: Frederik Jozef "Frédéric" Claessens
- Born: 9 February 1896 Niel, Belgium
- Died: 9 December 1931 (aged 35)

Cycling career
- Sport: Cycling

Frédéric Claessens (9 February 1896 – 9 December 1931) was a Belgian cyclist. He competed in the men's tandem event at the 1920 Summer Olympics.
