= Willem Ooms =

Dutch cyclist

Personal information
- Born: 13 January 1897 Sloten, Netherlands
- Died: 24 May 1972 (aged 75) The Hague, Netherlands

Cycling career
- Sport: Cycling

Willem Ooms (13 January 1897 – 24 May 1972) was a Dutch cyclist. He competed in the men's 50km event at the 1920 Summer Olympics.

== See also ==
- List of Dutch Olympic cyclists
