= Binard =

Belgian cyclist

Ernest Binard
Personal information
- Full name: Ernest Albert Binard
- Born: 1 February 1894 Molenbeek-Saint-Jean, Belgium
- Died: Unknown

Cycling career
- Sport: Cycling

Ernest Binard (born 1 February 1894) was a Belgian cyclist. He competed in the men's sprint event at the 1920 Summer Olympics.
