= Vittorio Cavalotti =

Italian cyclist

Personal information
- Born: 31 July 1893 Milan, Italy
- Died: 2 September 1939 (aged 46) Monza, Italy

Cycling career
- Sport: Cycling

Vittorio Cavalotti (31 July 1893 – 2 September 1939) was an Italian cyclist. He competed in the men's sprint event at the 1920 Summer Olympics.
