= Pietro Martinelli (cyclist) =

Italian cyclist

Personal information
- Full name: Pietro Martinelli

Cycling career
- Sport: Cycling

Pietro Martinelli was an Italian cyclist. He competed in the men's sprint event at the 1920 Summer Olympics.
