= Henri Habent =

French cyclist

Personal information
- Full name: Henri Habnet

Cycling career
- Sport: Cycling

Henri Habent was a French cyclist. He competed in the men's team pursuit event at the 1920 Summer Olympics.
