= Thomas Johnson (cyclist) =

British cyclist

Personal information
- Full name: Horace Thomas Johnson
- Nicknames: Tiny Johnson; H.T. Tiny Johnson; H.T. Johnny Johnson
- Born: 30 December 1886 Fulham, United Kingdom
- Died: 12 August 1966 (aged 79)
- Height: 5 ft 4 in (163 cm)
- Weight: ~155 lb (70 kg; 11.1 st)

Cycling career
- Sport: Cycling
- Discipline: Track sprinter

Amateur team
- 1905–1923: Putney A.C. and Catford C.C.

Major wins
- 1907, 1909 and 1910 – British Tandem Championships; 1908 – won silver in the Olympic tandem race National Quarter-mile Tandem record 1911 – Won 32 'top-class' races 1920 – second in the World Sprint championship 1920 – won silver in the Olympic 'individual sprint 1920 – won silver in the Olympic 'Team pursuit' 1922 – Amateur Sprint Championship of the World
Medal record
Men's cycling
Representing United Kingdom
Olympic Games
Silver medal – second place	1908 London	2,000 metre tandem race
Silver medal – second place	1920 Antwerp	1,000 metre individual sprint
Silver medal – second place	1920 Antwerp	Men's team pursuit

Horace Thomas Johnson (30 December 1886 – 12 August 1966) was a cyclist from Great Britain. He was born in Fulham, United Kingdom.

Johnson was often referred to as Tiny Johnson or H. T. Tiny Johnson. He won three silver medals at the Olympic games: the tandem race at the 1908 Summer Olympics in London, plus both the individual sprint the team pursuit at the 1920 Summer Olympics in Antwerp, Belgium.

== Career ==
Johnson took up cycle racing in 1905 when he joined Putney A.C. at the age of 17. By the age of 20, in 1908, he won a silver medal at the 1908 Summer Olympics in London, competing with Frederick (E.G.) Hamlin in the 2,000 metre tandem race.

In 1911 he won 32 races in top-class company.

At the 1920 Summer Olympics held in Antwerp, he won the silver medal after finishing second in the 1,000 metre individual sprint with a time of 15.1 seconds, identical to Harry Ryan who was awarded the bronze medal. The following day, 10 August, Johnson was a member of the British team in the Men's team pursuit. The team, which also included Cyril Alden, William Stewart, and Albert White, finished in the silver medal position with a time of 5 minutes 13.8 seconds.

In 1922, at the World Amateur Track Championships in Paris, he won the men's sprint title, beating the Olympic champion Maurice Peeters and teammate W. Ormston.

== Awards ==
=== Golden Book ===
Johnson's achievements were celebrated in 1949 when Cycling Weekly awarded him his own page in the Golden Book of Cycling.
