= Garden City Velodrome =

Velodrome in Antwerp, Belgium

Garden City Velodroom
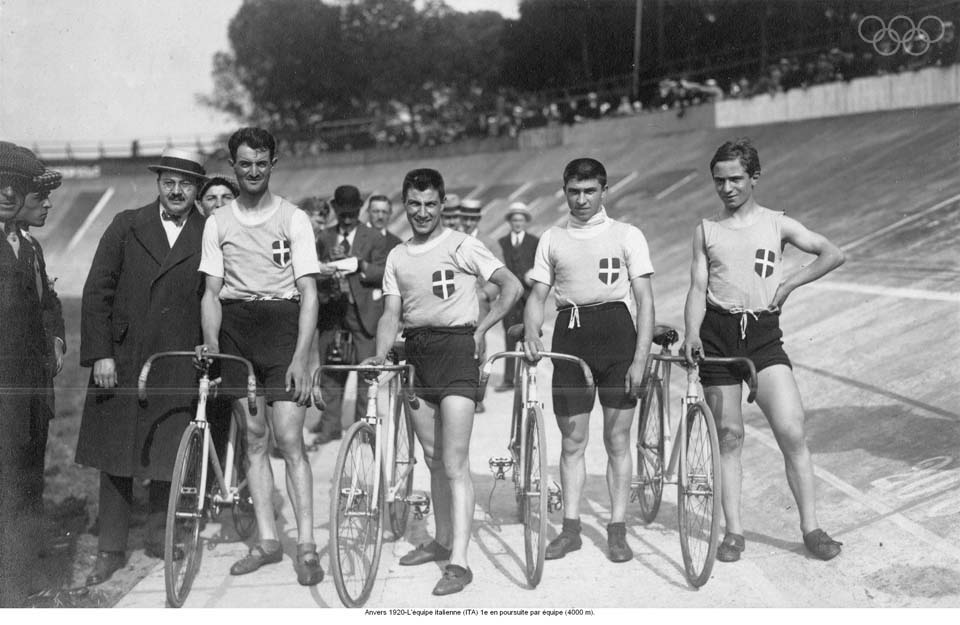
- The golden Italian team of the team pursuit in the Garden City Velodrome during the 1920 Summer Olympics (Franco Giorgetti, Ruggero Ferrario, Arnaldo Carli and Primo Magna)

- Location within Belgium
- Location: Antwerp, Belgium
- Coordinates: 51°10′N 04°23′E
- Capacity: 15,000
- Surface: Cement
- Field size: 400m length

Construction
- Opened: 28 June 1914
- Closed: 1925
- Years active: 1913–1925
- Architect: Hellner

The Garden City Velodrome was a velodrome located in Antwerp, Belgium. A 400-metre track, it hosted the track cycling events for the 1920 Summer Olympics and the UCI Track Cycling World Championships that year.

== History ==
Located in the Wilrijk district, the Garden City Velodrome was created to replace the demolished Zurenborg velodrome that was located in the Zurenborg area. The velodrome was ceremonially opened on June 28, 1914, the day of the assassination of Franz Ferdinand of Austria. This sparked a World War in which the cycling track was hardly used.

After the war, the facility was renovated. The first event held was the finish of the Tour of Belgium on 12 August 1919. On 9-10 August 1920, the track cycling competitions (sprints, tandems, a team race and a 50 km race) were held at the venue as part of the 1920 Summer Olympics. Due to high ticket prices, and the participation of only amateurs in the races, these competitions were not very popular.

A few days before the Olympic competition, the 23rd World Track Cycling Championships were also held on the track. Three competitions were held at the championships: an individual sprint for amateurs, an individual sprint for professionals and a motor-paced race for professionals.

Inside the track, the pitch was also used as a football field.

After 1920, the venue slowly declined in importance, mainly due to the poor condition of the concrete surface and the opening of new cycling tracks in the city. The last race at the track took place on 15 March 1925, and it was demolished shortly afterwards. Residential buildings were subsequently built in its place.

In Wilrijk, a street Garden Citylaan is named after this Olympic velodrome.

== See also ==
- List of cycling tracks and velodromes
