= Bovisio-Masciago =

Bovisio-Masciago Bovis-Masciagh (Lombard)
- Comune
- Comune di Bovisio-Masciago
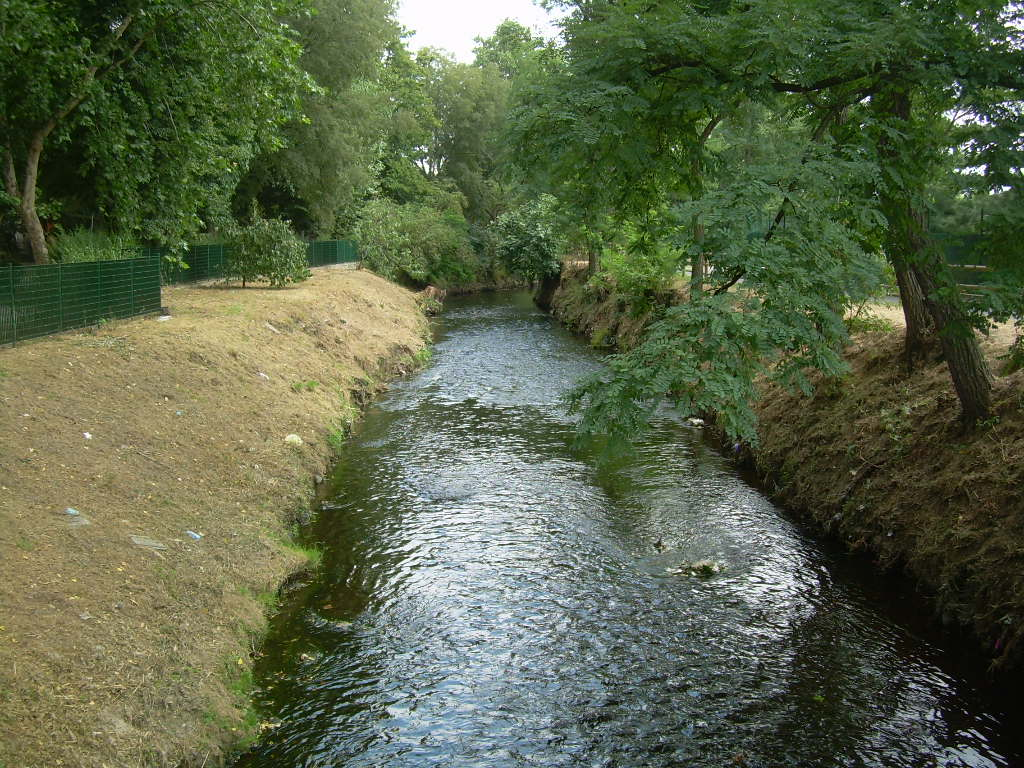
- Seveso River crossing Bovisio Masciago

- Coat of arms

- Location within Italy Location within Lombardy
- Coordinates: 45°37′N 9°9′E
- Country: Italy
- Region: Lombardy
- Province: Monza and Brianza (MB)

Government
  - Mayor: Giuliano Soldà

Area
  - Total: 4.93 km^{2} (1.90 sq mi)
- Elevation: 188 m (617 ft)

Population (31 March 2018)
  - Total: 16,925
  - Density: 3,430/km^{2} (8,890/sq mi)
- Demonym(s): Bovisiani and Masciaghesi
- Time zone: UTC+1 (CET)
  - Summer (DST): UTC+2 (CEST)
- Postal code: 20813
- Dialing code: 0362
- Website: Official website

Bovisio-Masciago (Brianzoeu: Bovis-Masciagh [buˈʋiːz maˈʃaːk]), is a comune (municipality) in the Province of Monza and Brianza in the Italian region Lombardy, located about 15 kilometres (9 mi) north of Milan.

== Geography ==
Bovisio Masciago is located in the Po Valley, the foothills of the nearby hills of Brianza. It is a few kilometers from Milan (easily accessible thanks to the Northern Railways of Milan), Como, Saronno and Monza. The city is crossed from north to south by the River Seveso. Bovisio is one of the 16 municipalities of the Park and one of three common Groane Oasis LIPU (Italian League for Bird Protection) of Cesano Maderno.

== History ==
=== Name ===
Bovisio Masciago arose in 1928, when the king of Italy Victor Emmanuel III, after consulting Italian Minister of the Interior Benito Mussolini, fused Bovisio and Masciago Milanese. The village was called "Bovisio", but people of Masciago protested; so, in 1947, the municipality was called Bovisio Masciago.

=== Bovisio ===
The name Bovisio should come from the Latin bovis otium and would like to show that in this place the Roman army took the supplies and animals. The confirmation of the Roman origins of Bovisio occurred in 1935 when it was discovered in its territory, a Gallo-Roman tomb containing various household items.

=== Masciago ===
The name of Masciago also has Latin origin and should be derived from Martis ager (Field of Mars) and would indicate that the location, the Roman era, had been a military camp.

== Economy ==
Formerly the main economic activity was agricultural, with many of the families engaged in the silkworm. Since the 19th century the industrial sector gradually developed. One of the most important industries in Bovisio was that of the Zari family, whose activities started in 1867. The company produced wooden floors and furniture and sewing machines. During World War I, Zari turned into a war industry producing wooden casings for aircraft.

Other industries present at Bovisio included:

- Golden Auction Limited Company
- L.I.G.A. (Italian Rubber Processing and Related)
- S.A.R.A. (Anonymous Society of Bovisio Weaving)
- Cork Marangoni & C. (founded in 1882, was one of the largest cork in Europe)
- Furnace Solcia.

Currently none of these industries is active. The furnace and many of the old warehouses have been demolished. Some sheds still house small artisan firms, but there are plans to redevelop their total demolition of the old town.

== Main sights ==
- Parish church of St. Pancrazio
- Ancient church of St. Martin Vescovo
- The parish church of St. Martin
- Villa Erba Odescalchi-Scotti (now Town Hall)
- Villa Sonzoni-Mariani-Compostela
- Villa Tanzi
- Villa Zari
- Villa Agnesi-Mariani-Radix-Ditches
- Villa Crofs

== People ==
- Anselm IV (1097), Archbishop of Milan
- Maria Gaetana Agnesi (1718), linguist, mathematician and philosopher
- Luigi Maria Monti (1825), Blessed
- Franco Giorgetti (1902), cyclist and Olympic Champion,
- Alessandra Fossati (1963), high jumper
