= Albert Alden (cyclist) =

English cyclist (1887–1965)

Personal information
- Nationality: British
- Born: 6 November 1887 London, England
- Died: 25 June 1965 (aged 77)
- Occupation: Cyclist

Sport
- Club: Kentish Wheelers, London
Medal record
Men's Cycling
Representing Great Britain
Cycling
| Silver medal – second place | 1920 Antwerp | 50 km race |
| Silver medal – second place | 1920 Antwerp | Team pursuit |
| Silver medal – second place | 1924 Paris | 50 km race |

Cyril Albert Alden (6 November 1887 – 25 June 1965) was an English cyclist who competed at the 1920 Olympic Games in Antwerp and in 1924 in Paris.

At the 1920 Olympics in Antwerp, Alden won two silver medals: one in the 50 km race and another as part of the British team in the team pursuit, finishing behind Italy. He also competed in the 1924 Olympics, earning silver again in the 50 km race.
