= Thomas Harvey (cyclist) =

British cyclist

Personal information
- Born: 3 July 1888 Westminster, England
- Died: 20 March 1965 (aged 76)

Cycling career
- Sport: Cycling

Amateur teams
- Catford C.C., London
- Paddington C.C., London

Thomas Henry Harvey (3 July 1888 – 20 March 1965) was a British cyclist. He competed at the 1920 and 1924 Summer Olympics.
