= Thomas Lance =

English track cyclist

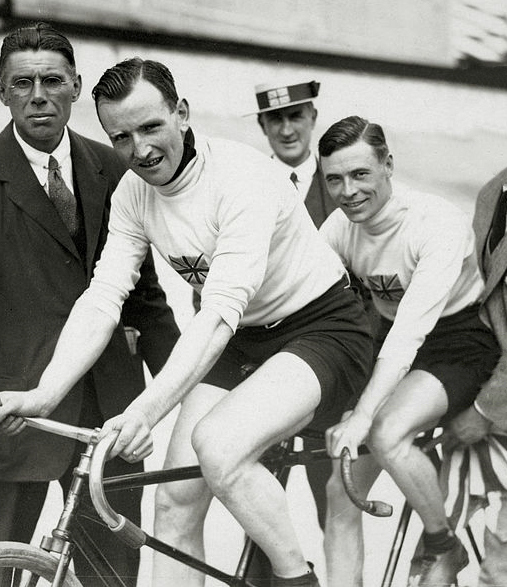
- Harry Ryan and Thomas Lance (right) at the 1920 Olympics

Personal information
- Full name: Thomas Glasson Lance
- Nickname: Tommy
- Born: 14 June 1891 Paddington, London, England
- Died: 29 February 1976 (aged 84) Brighton, England

Cycling career
- Sport: Cycling
- Discipline: Track
- Role: Rider
- Rider type: Tandem and sprint
Medal record
Representing Great Britain
Men's track cycling
Olympic Games
Gold medal – first place	1920 Antwerp	tandem

Thomas Glasson Lance (14 June 1891 – 29 February 1976) was a British track cycling racer. He won the tandem competition with Harry Ryan at the 1920 Summer Olympics. He also competed in the sprint event but was eliminated in the repechage.

Shortly before the Olympics, in June 1920, Ryan and Lance set a British quarter-mile record. After retiring from cycling Lance worked as a bookmaker in Brighton.
