= Henry Kaltenbrunn =

South African cyclist (1897–1971)

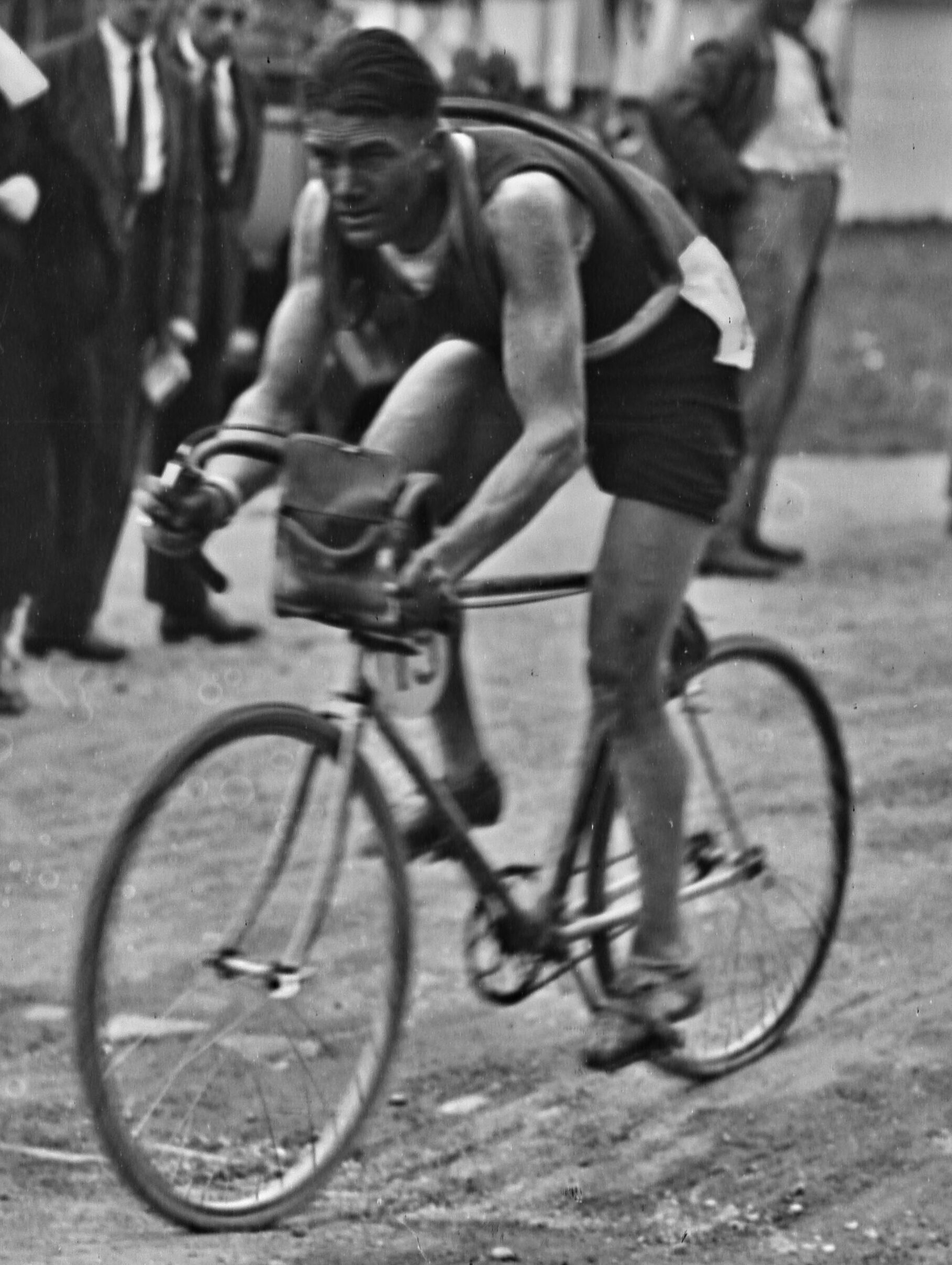

Medal record

Men's road bicycle racing

Representing South Africa

Olympic Games
Silver medal – second place	1920 Antwerp	Men's Road Race, Individual
Bronze medal – third place	1920 Antwerp	4000m Team Pursuit Men

Henry Gustaves Kaltenbrun (15 May 1897 in Vryburg – 15 February 1971 in Benoni) was a top South African cyclist from the 1920s.

At the 1920 Summer Olympics, Henry Kaltenbrun won the 100-mile Men's Road Race but was awarded only the Silver Medal after an appeal by Swedish competitor Stenquist, who claimed he had lost 4 minutes at a railway crossing. Kaltenbrun went on to win a Bronze in the 4000m Team Pursuit with C. Walker, W.R. Smith (who together also got Bronze in the tandem), and H.W. Goosen. Kaltenbrun also represented South Africa at the 1924 Summer Olympics. Henry Kaltenbrun and G.B. Thursfield were the only two cyclists who toured Australia and New Zealand in 1921 and 1922 as part of a Springbok team of athletes and cyclists. On this tour, Kaltenbrun won a total of 21 cycling races and broke 4 records, while Thursfield won 13 cycling races and broke 3 records. In 1921, Kaltenbrun won the South African quarter-mile, half-mile, 1-mile, 5-mile and 10-mile track championships. He repeated the 1-mile and 5-mile one in 1923 and again the half-mile and 1-mile in 1924. According to W. Jowett's records, Kaltenbrun won only one Natal title, the 5-mile in 1921. (Source: W Jowett: Centenary)
