= Maurice Peeters =

Dutch cyclist (1882–1957)

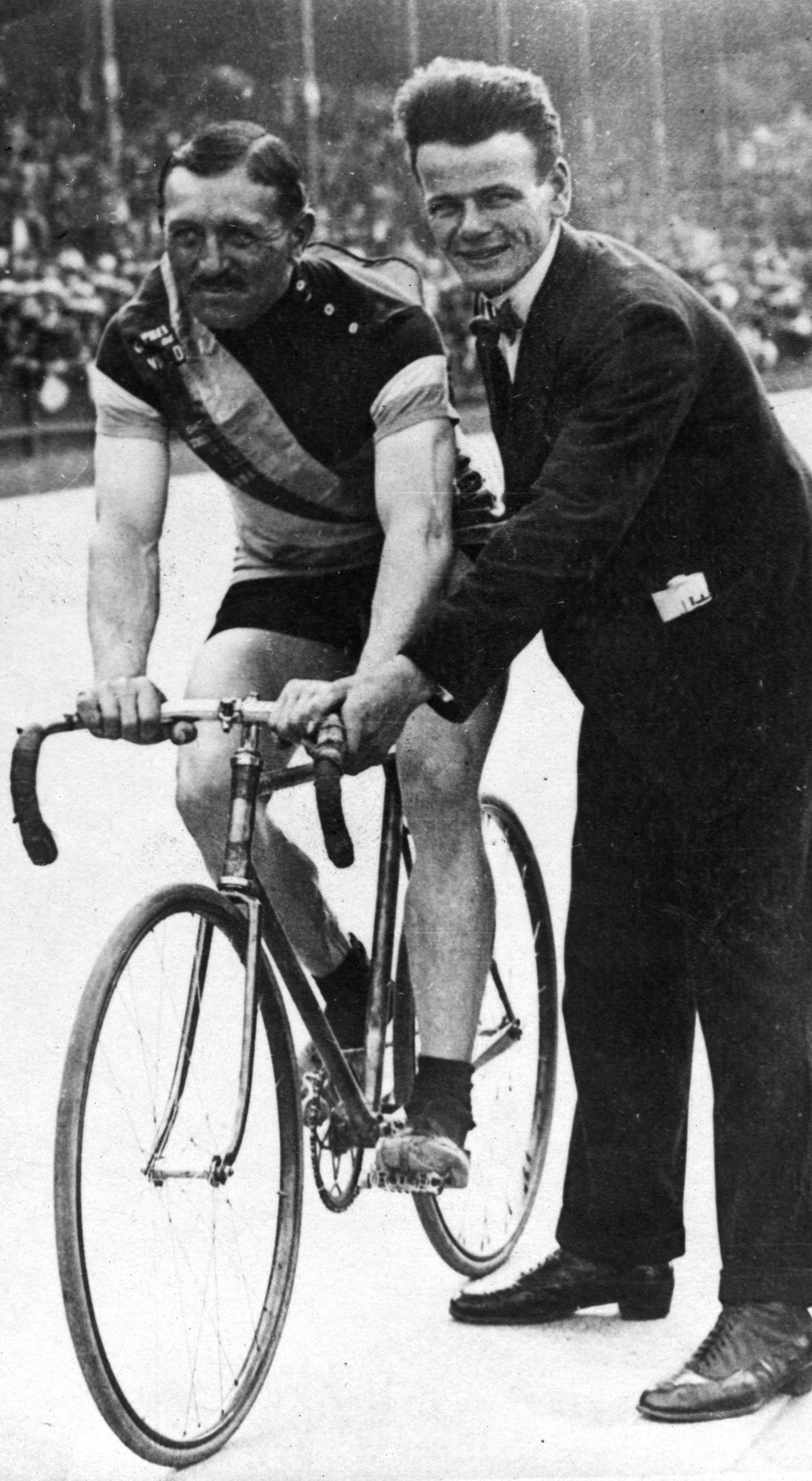
- Peeters after winning the 1km sprint at the 1920 Olympics

Personal information
- Full name: Mouritius Prosper Peeters
- Born: 5 May 1882 Antwerp, Belgium
- Died: 5 December 1957 (aged 75) Leidschendam, the Netherlands

Cycling career
- Sport: Cycling
- Discipline: Track
- Role: Rider
- Rider type: Sprinter
Medal record
Representing the Netherlands
Men's track cycling
Olympic Games
Gold medal – first place	1920 Antwerp	1000 m sprint
Bronze medal – third place	1924 Paris	2000 m tandem

Mouritius "Maurice" Prosper Peeters (5 May 1882 – 5 December 1957) was a track cyclist from the Netherlands, who represented his country at two consecutive Summer Olympics (1920 and 1924).

He was born in Antwerp, Belgium, but was raised in The Hague. He died in nearby Leidschendam.

In 1920, Peeters became amateur world champion in track cycling. One day later he rode the Olympic 1000m sprint, and of course he was considered a favourite. He lost in the first round, but his second place was enough to progress to the next round. He then won the quarter final and the semi-final. In the final, he rode against two British cyclists, Harry Ryan and Tiny Johnson. They tried to use their numerical advantage, and Ryan attacked. Peeters got him back. In the final corner, Johnson came around the corner to try towin the race, but Peeters was ahead and kept his lead. After winning the gold medal at the 1920 Summer Olympics in Antwerp (1000 m sprint), making him the first Dutch individual Olympic champion, he captured the bronze medal four years later in the 2000 m tandem competition, alongside Gerard Bosch van Drakestein.

== See also ==
- List of Dutch Olympic cyclists
