= Charles Van Doorselaer =

Belgian cyclist (1894–1972)

Charles Louis Pierre Van Doorselaer
Personal information
- Born: 16 January 1894 Molenbeek-Saint-Jean, Belgium
- Died: 20 June 1972 (aged 78) Halle, Belgium

Cycling career
- Sport: Cycling

Charles Van Doorselaer (16 January 1894 – 20 June 1972) was a Belgian cyclist. He competed in the men's team pursuit event at the 1920 Summer Olympics.
