= Lodovico Pavoni =

Italian Roman Catholic saint (1784–1849)

Saint Lodovico Pavoni FMI
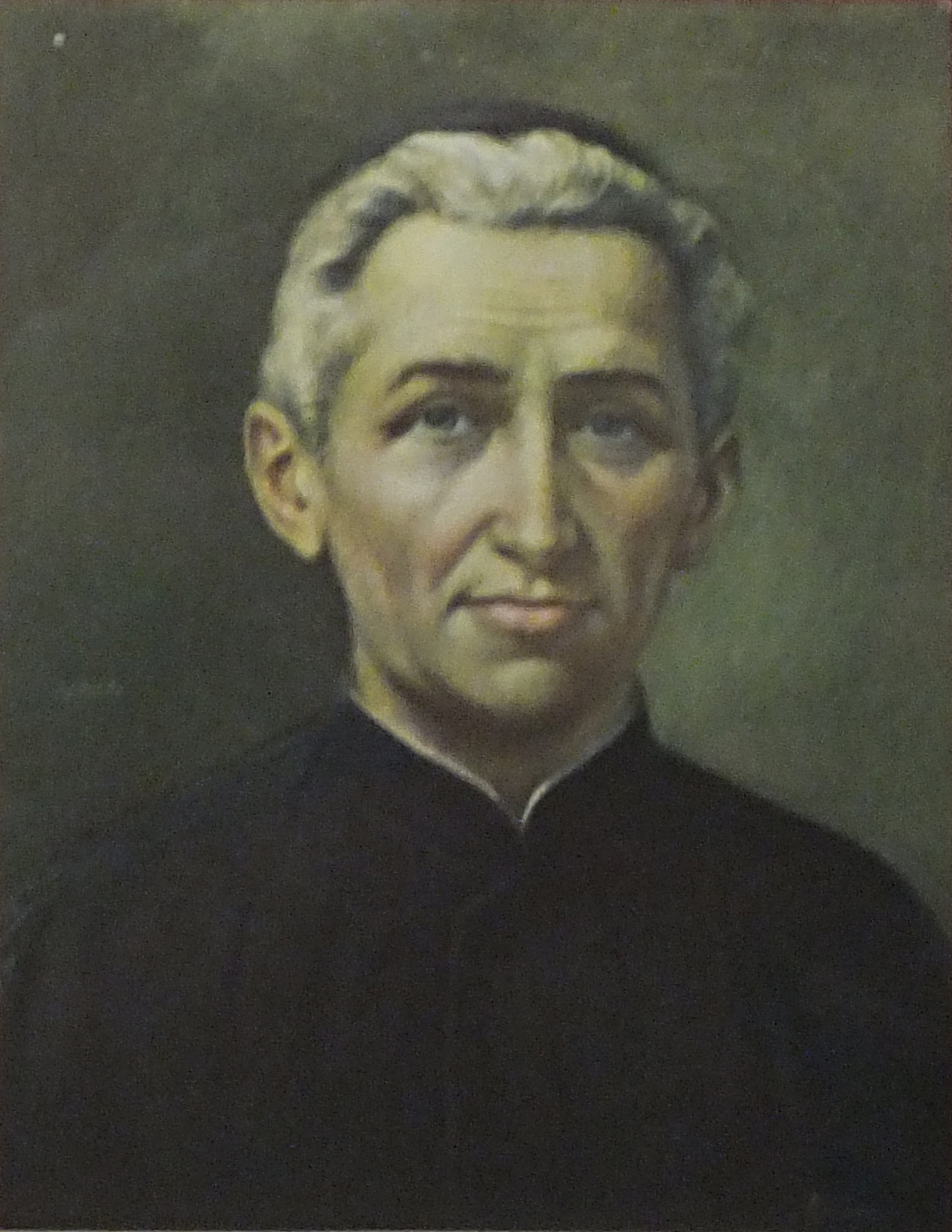

Priest
- Born: 11 September 1784; Brescia, Duchy of Milan
- Died: 1 April 1849 (aged 64); Saiano, Brescia, Kingdom of Lombardy–Venetia
- Venerated in: Roman Catholic Church
- Beatified: 14 April 2002, Saint Peter's Square, Vatican City by Pope John Paul II
- Canonized: 16 October 2016, Saint Peter's Square, Vatican City by Pope Francis
- Feast: 1 April; 27 May (Archdiocese of Milan); 28 May (Diocese of Brescia)
- Attributes: Cassock; Zucchetto
- Patronage: Sons of Mary Immaculate; Trade schools

Lodovico Pavoni, FMI (11 September 1784 – 1 April 1849) was an Italian Catholic priest who ministered in Brescia. He paid close attention to the needs of boys and was concerned with their education. In 1825, he established the Sons of Mary Immaculate, which came to be known also as the Pavoniani.

Pavoni was beatified on 14 April 2002 and is the patron of his order. The second miracle needed for his sainthood received the official approval of Pope Francis in 2016; his canonization was celebrated in St. Peter's Square on 16 October 2016.

== Life ==
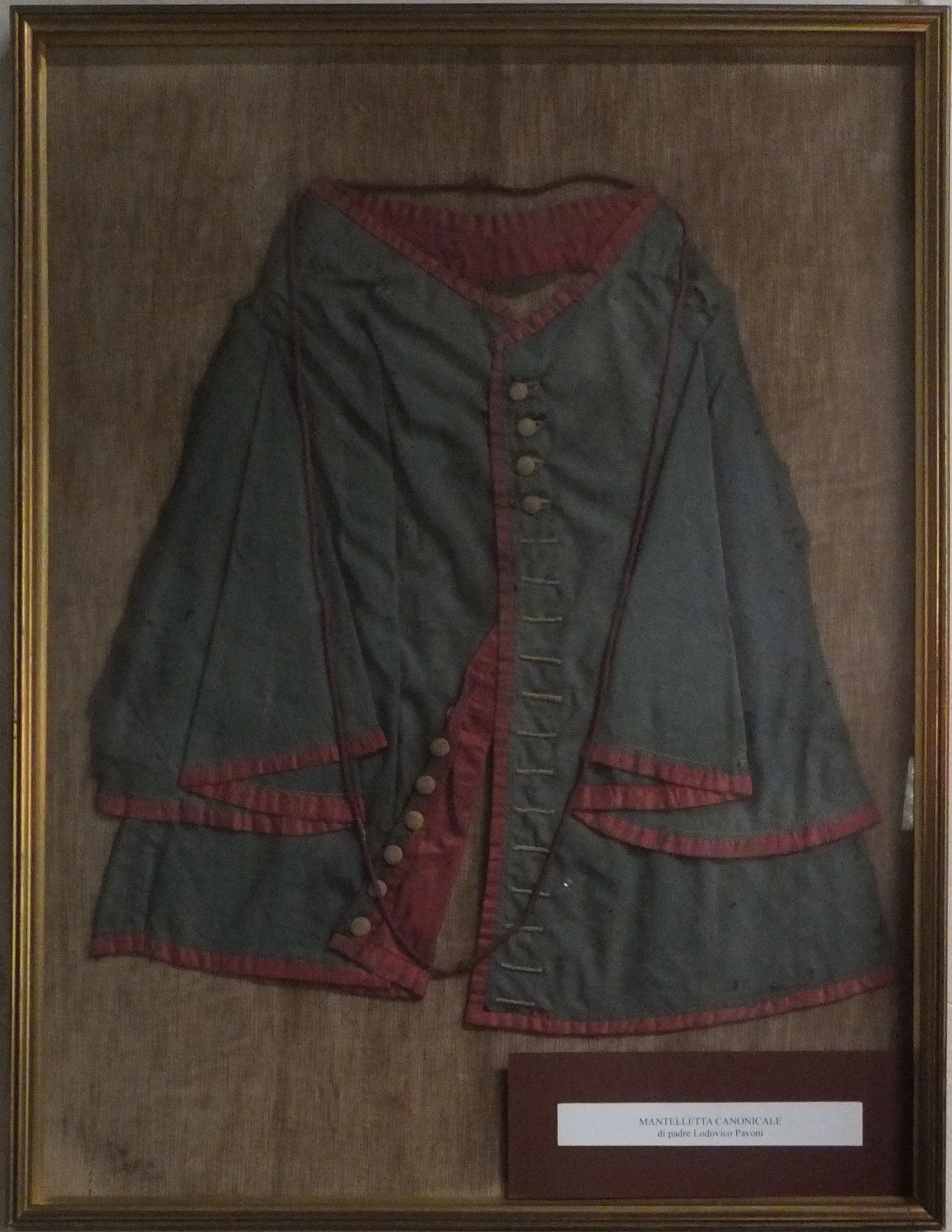
Pavoni's canonical cloak in a Brescia museum.

Lodovico Pavoni was born in Brescia on 11 September 1794 as the first of five brothers to Alessandro Pavoni and Lelia Poncarali.

Pavoni was a bright child and took a keen interest in the world around him while responding to the social problems of his time. He was skilled at painting and hunting and was also good at horseback riding.

He received his theological formation at the home of the Dominican Father Carlo Domenico Ferrari – the future Bishop of Brescia – while suffering a stall in his studies due to the Napoleonic era in which the French Emperor closed seminaries. He was ordained to the priesthood in 1807. Pavoni was appointed as an assistant to Bishop Gabrio Nava in 1812 and was named as a church rector on 16 March 1818 – he was assigned to the Church of Saint Barnabas.

In 1818 he received permission to found an orphanage and a vocational school that in 1821 would transform into the "Institute of Saint Barnabas". He decided that the first trade of this school would be in the field of book publishing and so in 1823 set up "The Publishing House of Saint Barnabas" – the precursor to the present Ancora press.

He opened a center for males and expanded it into a hostel in 1821 for their shelter and to include a school to teach them a particular trade which included programs to instruct them in being carpenters and silversmiths in addition to teaching them how to be blacksmiths shoemakers while focusing also on dye making. He extended this to deaf and mute people in 1823. He also purchased a farm around this time to set up an agricultural section for the school.

Pavoni founded his own congregation of priests and brothers in 1825 known as the Sons of Mary Immaculate, commonly referred to as the "Pavonians". Pope Gregory XVI granted his official assent to the congregation being in Brescia on 31 March 1843 after having received approval from officials in the Roman Curia. The Emperor of Austria provided imperial assent on 9 December 1846. On 8 December 1847 he and the first members of the congregation made their religious profession following diocesan approval and canonical erection from the vice capitular of the diocese of Brescia Mgr. Luchi.

The cholera epidemic in 1836 prompted him to tend to its victims and to take in more men. On 3 June 1844 he was decorated with the title of Knight of the Iron Crown from the Emperor of Austria Ferdinand I.

In 1849 he did his best to assist citizens who were in the middle of a cholera epidemic around the time of the Ten-Days conflict between Austria and Brescia where the latter rebelled against the former. Austrians prepared to pillage Brescia and so Pavoni led the men under his care to the novitiate located on the hill of Saiano.

Pavoni died at dawn on 1 April 1849 in Saiano – Palm Sunday – as the conflict endured and Brescia in flames. The order that he established went on to receive full papal approval from Pope Leo XIII on 24 September 1882 (and its constitutions in 1897) and went on to inspire fellow priests such as Giovanni Bosco and Leonardo Murialdo.

The order that Pavoni established flourished across the globe and numbers 210 members in a total of six nations including Spain and Colombia. As of 2008 there were 34 houses and out of the 210 religious there were 107 of them being priests.

== Sainthood ==
=== Process and beatification ===
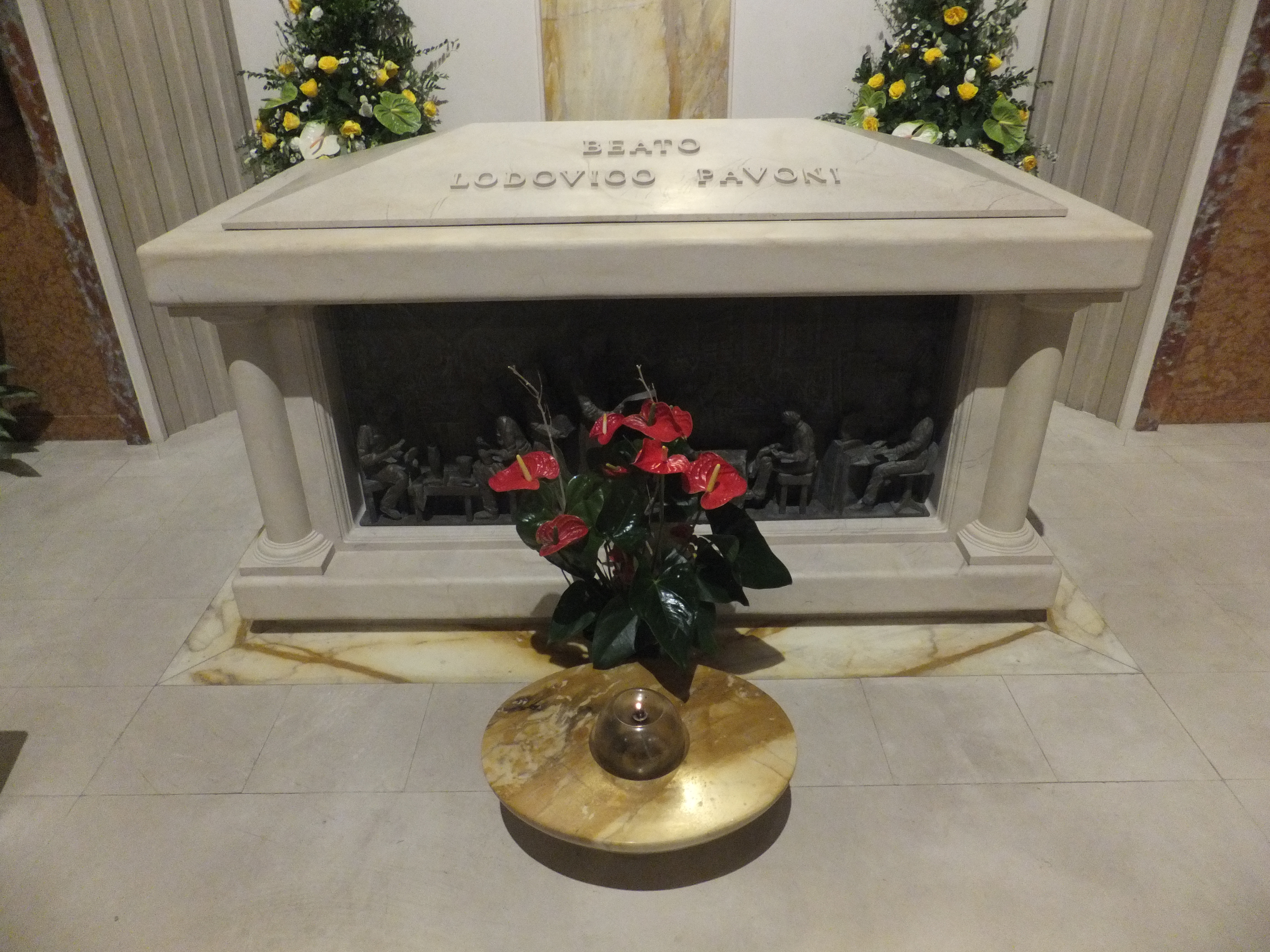
Tomb in Brescia.

The beatification process commenced in an informative process that opened in Brescia on 11 February 1908 and concluded its business on 7 October 1912. A team of theologians collated his writings and declared them to be in line with the Catholic faith on 12 April 1916.

The formal introduction for the cause came on 12 March 1919 after Pope Benedict XV made Pavoni known as a Servant of God: the first official stage in the process.

The informative process received the validation of the Congregation of Rites at the conclusion of a second process on two occasions on 23 June 1926 and 24 April 1942 while passing it to several committees for further assessment.

Pope Pius XII declared that Pavoni had lived a model Christian life of heroic virtue and declared him to be Venerable on 5 June 1947. The promulgated decree cites Pavoni as being the "... other Philip Neri ... precursor of Giovanni Bosco ... perfect emulator of Saint Giuseppe Cottolengo".

The miracle that would be investigated for his beatification was the 1909 healing of Maria Stevani who suffered from extreme typhoid fever and was vomiting and confined to her bed. She kept a relic of Pavoni under her pillow and was in a deep sleep on one night before being completely cured of her ailment in a case ruled as miraculous.

This presumed miracle attributed to his intercession was investigated in Cremona from 25 June 1925 to 3 August 1926 and was ratified decades later on 26 January 2001. The medical board voiced their assent to the miracle on 7 June 2001 while consulting theologians did so as well on 26 October 2001. The Congregation for the Causes of Saints also approved the healing on 4 December 2001.

Pope John Paul II approved the healing to be a credible miracle on 20 December 2001 and beatified Pavoni on 14 April 2002.

=== Second miracle ===
The second miracle that would be used for his canonization involved the July 2009 healing of Honorio Lopes Martins in São Paulo in Brazil. His son Diomar – of Pavoni's order – requested a chain of prayer to Pavoni for a cure and his father was cured at the month's end.

The diocesan process for the investigation of the alleged miracle was opened on 4 December 2012 – with Cardinal Odilo Pedro Scherer presiding over its inauguration – and concluded its work on 18 June 2013. A supplementary process was opened on 10 April 2014 and concluded on 26 August 2014.

The Congregation for the Causes of Saints validated the previous processes on 12 December 2014. A medical board approved it on 10 March 2016 with theologians to follow on 5 April 2016; the C.C.S. approved it on 3 May 2016 and passed it to Pope Francis who approved the healing to be a legitimate miracle on 9 May 2016.

A date was set for his canonization at a gathering of cardinals on 20 June 2016. Pavoni was canonized as a saint on 16 October 2016.

=== Postulation ===
Father Pietro Riva was the postulator of the cause at the time of the canonization.
