= Herbert Lee (cyclist) =

British cyclist

Herbert Henry Lee
Personal information
- Born: 27 March 1887 Finsbury Park, England
- Died: 13 June 1980 (aged 93)

Cycling career
- Sport: Cycling

Amateur team
- Kentish Wheelers, London

Herbert Henry Lee (27 March 1887 – 13 June 1980) was a British cyclist. He competed at the 1920 and the 1924 Summer Olympics.
