= Georges Enguerrand =

French cyclist

Personal information
- Full name: Georges Enguerrand

Cycling career
- Sport: Cycling

Georges Enguerrand was a French cyclist. He competed in two events at the 1920 Summer Olympics.
