= Henri Bellivier =

French cyclist

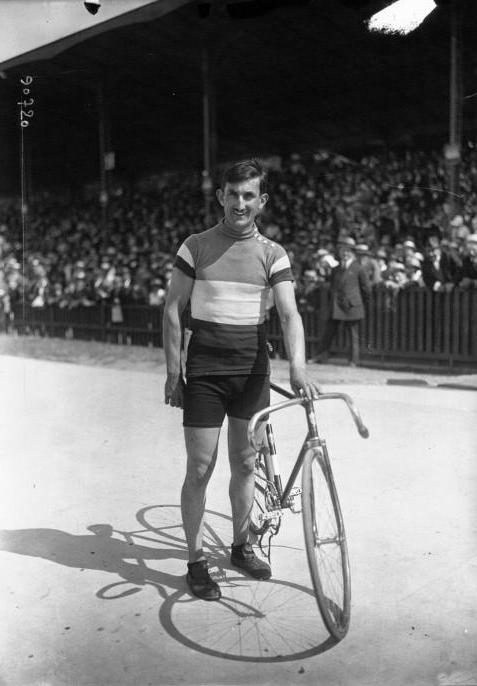
- Bellivier in 1921

Personal information
- Born: 6 June 1890 Saint-André-de-Cubzac, France
- Died: 14 March 1980 (aged 89) Ambilly, France

Cycling career
- Sport: Cycling

Henri Bellivier (6 June 1890 – 14 March 1980) was a French cyclist. He competed in two events at the 1920 Summer Olympics.
