= Primo Magnani =

Italian cyclist (1892–1969)

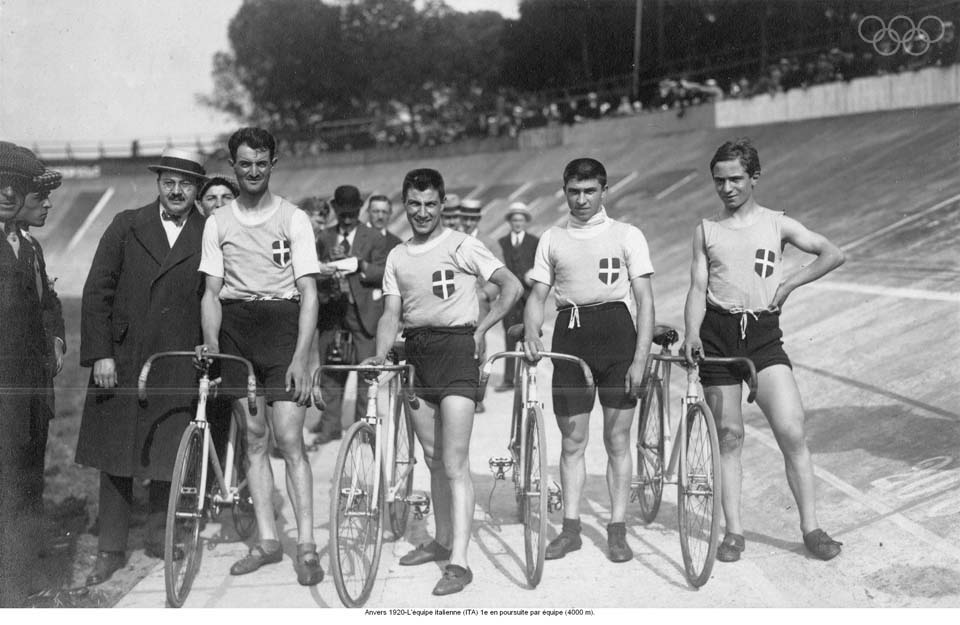
- Magnani at the 1920 Summer Olympics

Personal information
- Full name: Primo Magnani
- Born: 31 March 1892 Pavia, Italy
- Died: 17 June 1969 (aged 77) Milan, Italy

Cycling career
- Sport: Cycling
- Discipline: Track
- Role: Rider
Medal record
Representing Italy
Men's track cycling
Olympic Games
Gold medal – first place	1920 Antwerp	Team pursuit

Primo Magnani (31 March 1892 – 17 June 1969) was an Italian racing cyclist and Olympic champion in track cycling.

He won a gold medal in the team pursuit at the 1920 Summer Olympics in Antwerp (with Arnaldo Carli, Ruggero Ferrario and Franco Giorgetti). Magnani also participated in the 50 kilometres competition but his exact result is unknown.
