= John Verhoeven (cyclist) =

Belgian cyclist

Personal information
- Full name: John Verhoeven

Cycling career
- Sport: Cycling

John Verhoeven was a Belgian cyclist. He competed in two events at the 1920 Summer Olympics.
