= Christopher Dotterweich =

American cyclist

Personal information
- Born: March 24, 1896 Newark, New Jersey, United States
- Died: November 20, 1969 (aged 73) Belford, New Jersey, United States

Cycling career
- Sport: Cycling

Christopher Dotterweich (March 24, 1896 – November 20, 1969) was an American cyclist. He competed in two events at the 1920 Summer Olympics.
