= Courder =

French cyclist

Jean Courder
Cycling career
- Sport: Cycling
- Role: Rider

Jean Courder was a French cyclist. He competed in two events at the 1920 Summer Olympics.
