= George Thursfield =

South African cyclist

George Edwin Thursfield
Personal information
- Full name: George Edwin Thursfield
- Born: 20 November 1893 Aldershot, England

Cycling career
- Sport: Cycling

George Thursfield (born 20 November 1893, date of death unknown) was a South African cyclist. He competed in two events at the 1920 Summer Olympics.
