= Albert White (cyclist) =

British cyclist (1890–1965)

Personal information
- Full name: George Albert White
- Born: 19 February 1890 Brigg, Lincolnshire, England
- Died: 1 March 1965 (aged 75) Scunthorpe, England

Cycling career
- Sport: Cycling
Medal record
Men's track cycling
Representing Great Britain
Olympic Games
Silver medal – second place	1920 Antwerp	Team pursuit

George Albert "Lal" White (19 February 1890 – 1 March 1965) was a British cyclist. He competed in two events at the 1920 Summer Olympics winning a silver medal in the men's team pursuit.

White was the subject of a 2012 Cultural Olympiad community opera called Cycle Song. It was composed by Tim Sutton and the librettist was Ian McMillan. The Scunthorpe Co-operative Junior Choir, Proper Job Theatre Company and over a thousand locals participated.
