= Arnaldo Carli =

Italian cyclist

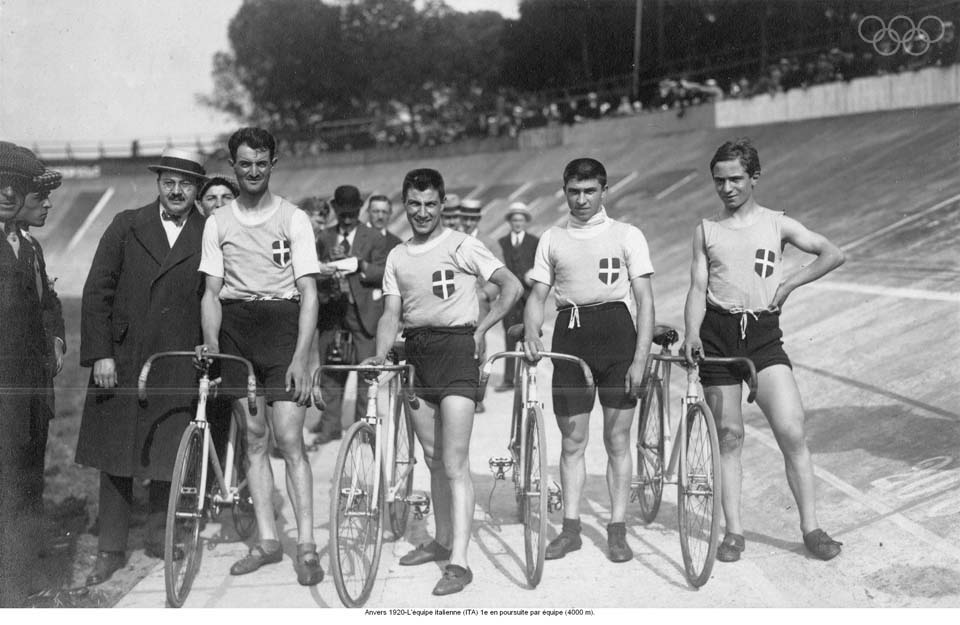
- Carli at the 1920 Summer Olympics

Personal information
- Full name: Arnaldo Carli
- Born: 30 July 1901 Milan, Italy
- Died: 20 December 1983 (aged 82) Corsico, Italy

Cycling career
- Sport: Cycling
- Discipline: Track
- Role: Rider
Medal record
Men's track cycling
Representing Italy
Olympic Games
Gold medal – first place	1920 Antwerp	Team pursuit

Arnaldo Carli (30 July 1901 – 20 December 1983) was an Italian racing cyclist and Olympic champion in track cycling. He was born in Milan.

Carli won a gold medal in team pursuit at the 1920 Summer Olympics in Antwerp (with Ruggero Ferrario, Franco Giorgetti and Primo Magnani).
