= Albert De Bunne =

Belgian cyclist

Personal information
- Born: 16 February 1896 Brussels

Cycling career
- Sport: Cycling
Medal record
Men's road bicycle racing
Representing Belgium
Olympic Games
Bronze medal – third place	1920 Antwerp	Team road race

Albert De Bunne (born 16 February 1896, date of death unknown) was a Belgian cyclist. In 1919 he won the Belgian Amateur Road-Championships. He won the bronze medal in the Team road race at the 1920 Summer Olympics, along with a fifth place in the Individual road race and a fourth place in the 4,000 metres Team pursuit.
