= Bernard Janssens =

Belgian cyclist

Medal record

Representing Belgium

Men's road bicycle racing

Olympic Games
Bronze medal – third place	1920 Antwerp	Team road race

Bernard Janssens (born 18 August 1895, date of death unknown) was a Belgian cyclist. He won the bronze medal in the team road race in the 1920 Summer Olympics.
