= Frans de Vreng =

Dutch cyclist (1898–1974)

Personal information
- Full name: Franciscus de Vreng
- Born: 11 April 1898 Amsterdam, Netherlands
- Died: 13 March 1974 (aged 75) Amsterdam, Netherlands

Cycling career
- Sport: Cycling
Medal record
Men's track cycling
Representing the Netherlands
Olympic Games
Bronze medal – third place	1920 Antwerp	2000m Tandem

Franciscus "Frans" de Vreng (11 April 1898 in Amsterdam – 13 March 1974 in Amsterdam) was a track cyclist who represented the Netherlands at the 1920 Summer Olympics in Antwerp, Belgium. There he won the bronze medal in the 2,000m tandem competition, alongside Piet Ikelaar.

== See also ==
- List of Dutch Olympic cyclists
