= Harold Bounsall =

Canadian cyclist

Personal information
- Born: 5 September 1897 Toronto, Ontario, Canada
- Died: 19 May 1978 (aged 80)

Cycling career
- Sport: Cycling

Harold Bounsall (5 September 1897 – 19 May 1978) was a Canadian cyclist. He competed in five events at the 1920 Summer Olympics.
