= William Stewart (cyclist) =

British cyclist

Personal information
- Born: 15 September 1883 Dufftown, Scotland
- Died: 9 August 1950 (aged 66) Bishop's Stortford, England

Cycling career
- Sport: Cycling

Amateur team
- Kentish Wheelers, London
Medal record
Representing Great Britain
Olympic Games
Men's track cycling
Silver medal – second place	1920 Antwerp	Team pursuit

William George Alexander Stewart (15 September 1883 – 9 August 1950) was a British cyclist. He competed in three events at the 1920 Summer Olympics, winning a silver medal in the men's team pursuit. He also competed in one event at the 1924 Summer Olympics.
