= William Smith (cyclist, born 1893) =

South African cyclist

Medal record

Men's road bicycle racing

Representing South Africa

Olympic Games
Silver medal – second place	1920 Antwerp	Tandem
Bronze medal – third place	1920 Antwerp	4000m Team Pursuit Men

William Smith (1893 – October 1958) was a South African cyclist. He won the silver medal in Tandem and a Bronze in the 4000m Team Pursuit Men in the 1920 Summer Olympics.
