= Fred Taylor (cyclist) =

American cyclist (1890–1968)

Personal information
- Born: March 8, 1890 Newark, New Jersey, United States
- Died: January 1968

Cycling career
- Sport: Cycling

Fred Taylor (March 8, 1890 – January 1968) was an American cyclist. He competed in three events at the 1920 Summer Olympics.
