= James Walker (cyclist) =

South African cyclist

Medal record

Men's road bicycle racing

Representing South Africa

Olympic Games
Silver medal – second place	1920 Antwerp	Tandem
Bronze medal – third place	1920 Antwerp	4000m Team Pursuit Men

James Walker (born 1897, date of death unknown) was a South African cyclist. He won the Silver Medal in Tandem and a Bronze in the 4000m Team Pursuit Men in the 1920 Summer Olympics.
