= William Beck (cyclist) =

American cyclist

Personal information
- Born: October 9, 1894 Newark, New Jersey, United States
- Died: May 14, 1975 (aged 80)

Cycling career
- Sport: Cycling

William Beck (October 9, 1894 – May 14, 1975) was an American cyclist. He competed in three events at the 1920 Summer Olympics.
