= Sammy Goosen =

South African cyclist

Medal record

Men's road bicycle racing

Representing South Africa

Olympic Games
Bronze medal – third place	1920 Antwerp	4000m Team Pursuit Men

Sammy Goosen (born 1892, date of death unknown) was a South African cyclist. He won a bronze medal in the 4000m Team Pursuit Men in the 1920 Summer Olympics.
