= Gustave De Schryver =

Belgian cyclist

Personal information
- Full name: Gustave De Schryver
- Born: 15 February 1891
- Died: 22 September 1949 (aged 58)

Cycling career
- Sport: Cycling

Gustave De Schryver (15 February 1891 – 22 September 1949) was a Belgian cyclist. He competed in the Men's 4000m Team Pursuit and the Men's 50 km at the 1920 Summer Olympics.
