= Ruggero Ferrario =

Italian cyclist (1897–1976)

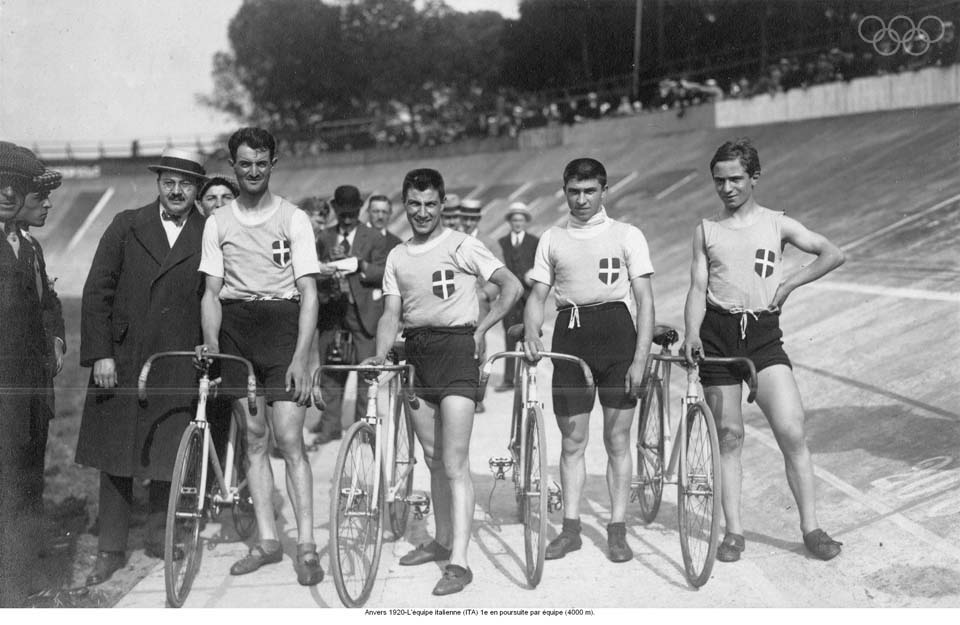
- Ferrario at the 1920 Summer Olympics

Personal information
- Full name: Ruggero Ferrario
- Born: 7 October 1897 Milan, Italy
- Died: 15 July 1976 (aged 78) Milan, Italy

Cycling career
- Sport: Cycling
- Discipline: Track
- Role: Rider
- Rider type: Endurance
Medal record
Representing Italy
Men's track cycling
Olympic Games
Gold medal – first place	Antwerp 1920	Team pursuit

Ruggero Ferrario (7 October 1897 – 15 July 1976) was an Italian racing cyclist and Olympic champion in track cycling. He won a gold medal in team pursuit at the 1920 Summer Olympics in Antwerp (with Arnaldo Carli, Franco Giorgetti and Primo Magnani). He won the first Coppa Bernocchi race in 1919.
