= Anthony Young (cyclist) =

American cyclist

Personal information
- Born: April 7, 1900 Newark, New Jersey, United States
- Died: August 22, 1970 (aged 70) Springfield, New Jersey, United States

Cycling career
- Sport: Cycling

Anthony Young (April 7, 1900 – August 22, 1970) was an American cyclist. He competed in three events at the 1920 Summer Olympics.
