= Harry Ryan (cyclist) =

English racing cyclist

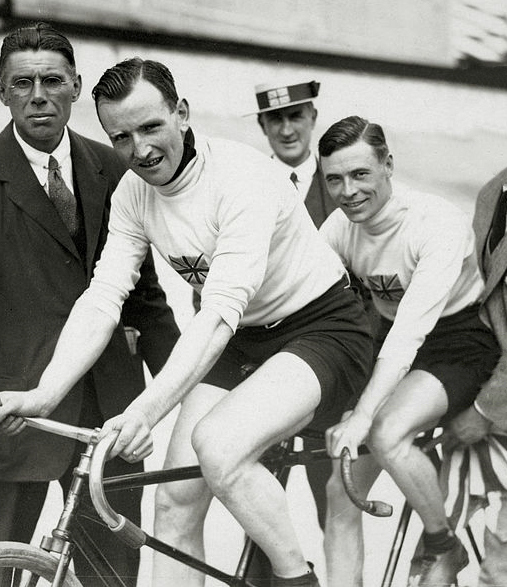
- Harry Ryan (left) and Thomas Lance at the 1920 Olympics

Personal information
- Full name: Harry Edgar Ryan
- Born: 21 November 1893 St Pancras, London, England
- Died: 14 April 1961 (aged 67) Ealing, London, England

Cycling career
- Sport: Cycling
- Discipline: Track
- Role: Rider
- Rider type: Tandem and sprint
Medal record
Men's track cycling
Representing Great Britain
Olympic Games
Gold medal – first place	1920 Antwerp	Tandem
Bronze medal – third place	1920 Antwerp	Sprint

Harry Edgar Ryan (21 November 1893 – 14 April 1961) was a British track cycling racer. Ryan came second in the world amateur sprint championship in 1913. He competed at the 1920 Summer Olympics and won the tandem competition with Thomas Lance, as well as a bronze medal in the sprint.

Ryan lived at 312 Euston Road, St Pancras, London in 1901. His father was a cutler, toolmaker and shopkeeper of Buck & Ryan. After retiring from competitions, Ryan converted Buck & Ryan into a successful concern. He also became a prominent cycling administrator, supervising most of the major competitions in Europe.
