= Norman Webster (cyclist) =

Canadian cyclist

Personal information
- Born: 20 May 1896 Unionville, Ontario, Canada
- Died: 11 January 1967 (aged 70)

Cycling career
- Sport: Cycling

Norman Webster (20 May 1896 – 11 January 1967) was a Canadian cyclist. He competed in five events at the 1920 Summer Olympics.
