= Henry Brask Andersen =

Danish cyclist

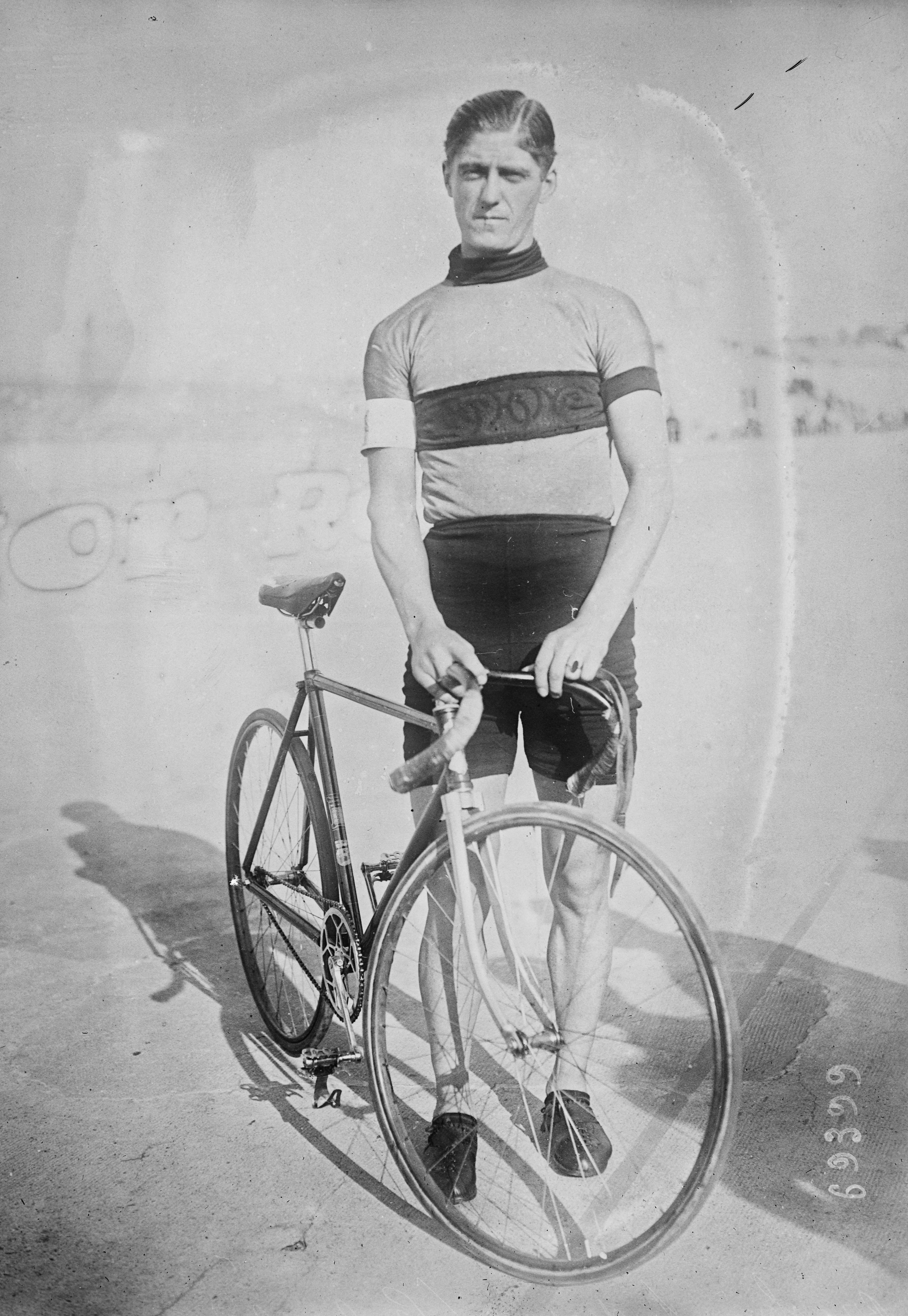
- Andersen in 1921

Personal information
- Born: 23 June 1896 Copenhagen, Denmark
- Died: 26 November 1970 (aged 74) Gentofte, Denmark

Cycling career
- Sport: Cycling
Medal record
Representing Denmark
World Championships
Gold medal – first place	1921 Copenhagen	Sprint

Henry Anders Peter Brask Andersen (23 June 1896 – 26 November 1970) was a Danish amateur track cyclist who won the sprint event at the 1921 World Championships. He was the national champion in the sprint in 1918–1921 and 1926–1928. He competed in the sprint and tandem events at the 1920 Summer Olympics, but failed to reach the finals.

His son Kield Brask Andersen won the Danish sprint title in 1939.
