= Piet Ikelaar =

Dutch cyclist (1896–1992)

Medal record

Representing the Netherlands

Men's track cycling

Olympic Games
Bronze medal – third place	1920 Antwerpen	50km Track Race
Bronze medal – third place	1920 Antwerpen	2000m Tandem

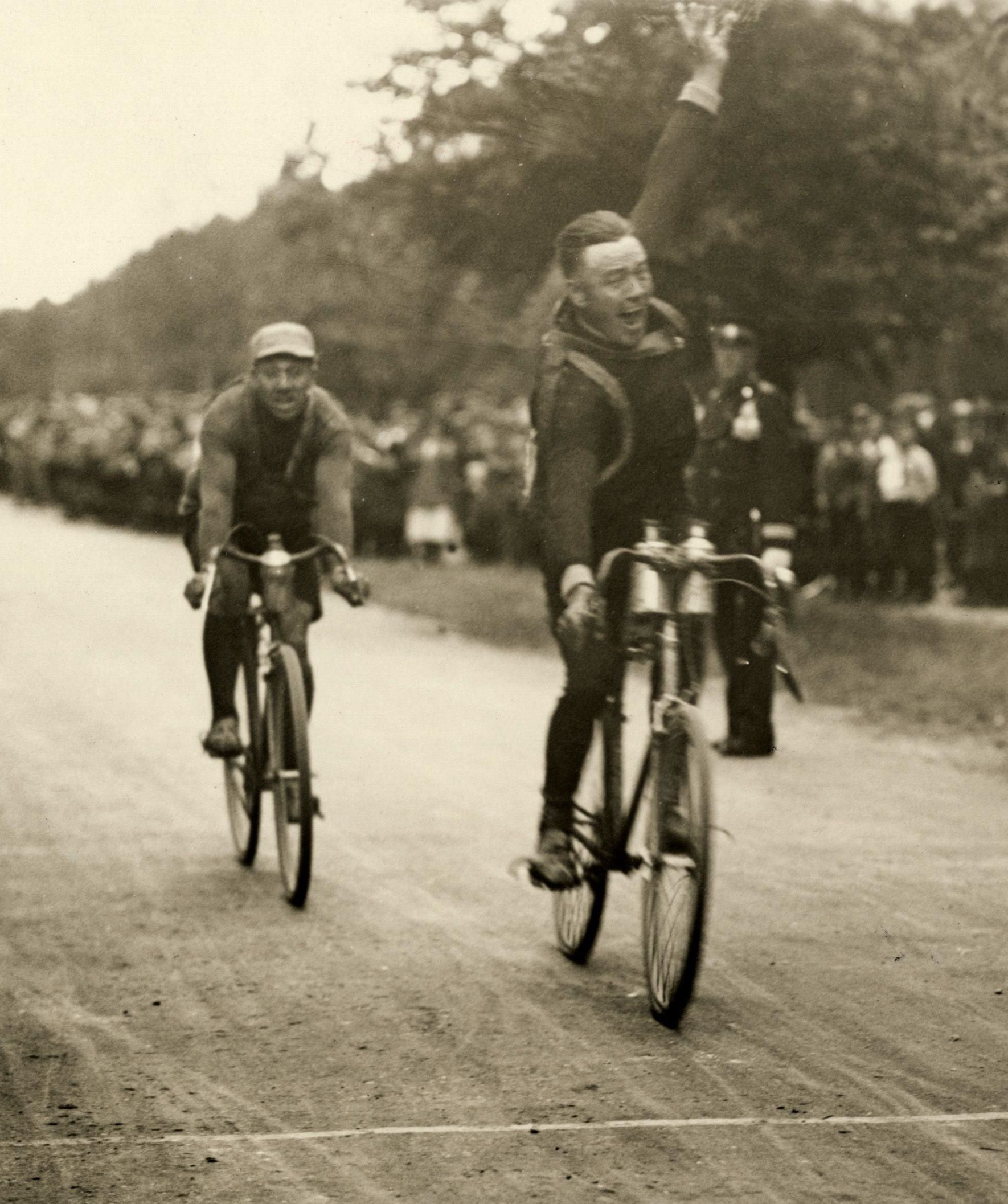
Jorinus van der Wiel winning the 1925 Dutch road championship, followed by Piet Ikelaar.

Petrus "Piet" Gerardus Ikelaar (2 January 1896, in Nieuwer Amstel – 25 November 1992, in Zaandam) was a track cyclist from the Netherlands. He represented the Netherlands at the 1920 Summer Olympics. At his first appearance he won bronze medals in the 50 km track race and the 2000m tandem competition, alongside Frans de Vreng.

== See also ==
- List of Dutch Olympic cyclists
