= Franco Giorgetti =

Italian cyclist (1902–1983)

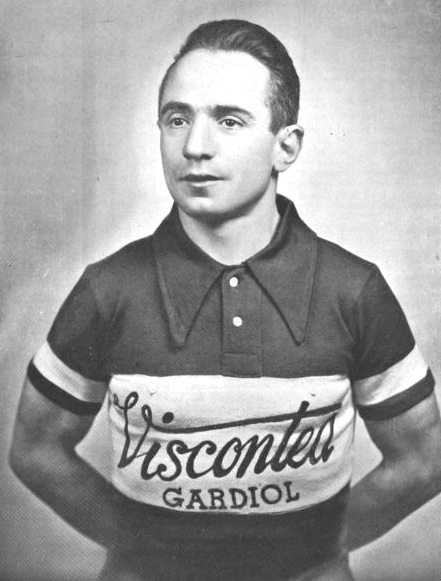
- Franco Giorgetti

Personal information
- Full name: Franco Giorgetti
- Born: 13 October 1902 Bovisio-Masciago, Italy
- Died: 18 March 1983 (aged 80) Varese, Italy

Cycling career
- Sport: Cycling
- Discipline: Track
- Role: Rider
Medal record
Men's track cycling
Representing Italy
Olympic Games
Gold medal – first place	Antwerp 1920	Team pursuit

Franco Giorgetti (13 October 1902 – 18 March 1983) was an Italian racing cyclist and Olympic champion in track cycling.

Giorgetti was born in Bovisio-Masciago. He won a gold medal in the team pursuit at the 1920 Summer Olympics in Antwerp (with Arnaldo Carli, Ruggero Ferrario and Primo Magnani). Giorgetti also specialized motor-paced racing. He was the American motor-paced champion in 1927, 1928, 1929, 1930, and 1934 and won the Italian championship in 1933 and 1941. He was a top six-day racer as well. He won the prestigious Six Days of New York a record eight times, the first time in 1926 with Reggie McNamara. He returned to Italy before World War II and died in Varese, aged 80.
