= Great Britain at the Olympics =

- Flag of the United Kingdom
- IOC code: GBR
- NOC: British Olympic Association
- Medals Ranked 5th: Gold 318 Silver 346 Bronze 361 Total 1,025

Summer appearances
- 1896; 1900; 1904; 1908; 1912; 1920; 1924; 1928; 1932; 1936; 1948; 1952; 1956; 1960; 1964; 1968; 1972; 1976; 1980; 1984; 1988; 1992; 1996; 2000; 2004; 2008; 2012; 2016; 2020; 2024; 2028

Winter appearances
- 1924; 1928; 1932; 1936; 1948; 1952; 1956; 1960; 1964; 1968; 1972; 1976; 1980; 1984; 1988; 1992; 1994; 1998; 2002; 2006; 2010; 2014; 2018; 2022; 2026

Other related appearances
- 1906 Intercalated Games

The United Kingdom of Great Britain and Northern Ireland, referred to as simply "Great Britain", has been represented at every modern Olympic Games. As of the 2024 Summer Olympics, it is third in the all-time Summer Olympic medal table by overall number of medals and fourth in number of gold medals won. London hosted the Summer Olympic Games in 1908, 1948 and 2012.

Athletes from the United Kingdom compete as part of the Great Britain and Northern Ireland Olympic Team, branded "Team GB". The team is organised by the British Olympic Association, the National Olympic Committee for the UK. Team GB also represents the three Crown Dependencies of Guernsey, Jersey and the Isle of Man and the UK's Overseas Territories (with the exceptions of Bermuda, the British Virgin Islands and the Cayman Islands). Athletes from Northern Ireland can choose to compete for either Great Britain or Ireland, with most choosing Ireland. (Note: In Northern Ireland, most sports (such as basketball and hockey) are organised on an all-Ireland basis, with their sports federations being more intertwined with Ireland at the Olympics. Athletes under all-Ireland sports federations may align with them and represent Ireland.) The use of "Great Britain" over "United Kingdom" has faced criticism in Northern Ireland.

British athletes have won a combined total of 1,025 medals at the Olympic Games; 979 of those medals were won at the Summer Olympics, where Team GB is the only team to have won at least one gold medal at every games. Team GB is also the only team to have won at least one athletics medal at every Summer Olympic Games. The team has been less successful at the Winter Olympics, winning 39 medals, 15 of them gold. The UK finished in first place on the medals table at the 1908 games, placed second at the 2016 games and third at the 1900, 1912, 1920 and 2012 games.

The most successful British Olympian by gold medals and total medals won is Sir Jason Kenny, who has won seven gold medals and nine overall, all in track cycling. The cyclist Dame Laura Kenny and the dressage rider Charlotte Dujardin share the record for the most medals won by a female British athlete, with six each; Kenny's five gold medals are the female British record. The most successful Winter Olympians from Team GB are skeleton racers Lizzy Yarnold and Matt Weston, with two gold medals each.

== Timeline of participation ==
Olympic Years	Teams	
1896–1920	Great Britain	
1924–present	Great Britain	Ireland

== Eligibility ==
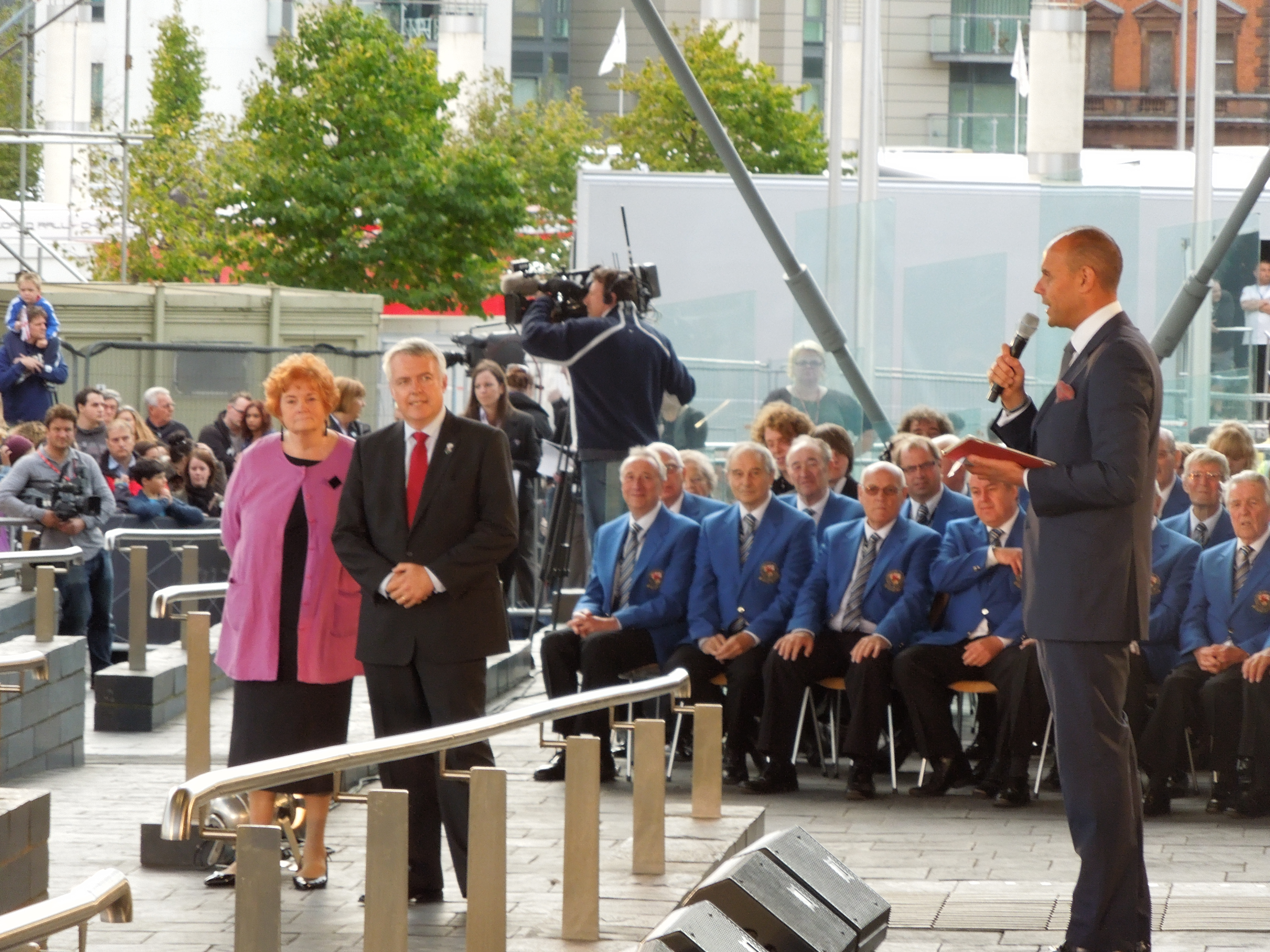
A heroes' welcome for Welsh Olympians and Paralympians at the Senedd building, 2012

As the National Olympic Committee (NOC) for the United Kingdom, the British Olympic Association (BOA) membership encompasses the four Home Nations of the United Kingdom (England, Northern Ireland, Scotland and Wales, who notably compete separately in many international sports outside Olympic competition for historic reasons), plus the three Crown Dependencies (Guernsey, Isle of Man and Jersey), and all but three of the British Overseas Territories(Bermuda, British Virgin Islands and Cayman Islands have their own NOCs).

Representatives of the devolved Northern Ireland government and others in the region have objected to the name "Team GB" as discriminatory and called for it to be renamed as "Team UK" to make it clearer that Northern Ireland is included on the team.

Under the IOC charter, the Olympic Federation of Ireland is also responsible for the entire island of Ireland. However, athletes from Northern Ireland can elect to represent either Great Britain or Ireland at the Olympics, as people of Northern Ireland. A number of Northern Irish-born athletes, particularly in boxing, have won medals for Ireland at the Games, while a small number of athletes from Northern Ireland have represented both Team GB and Team Ireland, most recently swimming gold medallist Jack McMillan.

Usually most of Northern Ireland's athletes at the Olympics compete for Team Ireland. At the 2024 Summer Olympics, 6 athletes (16%) from Northern Ireland, represented Great Britain, while 31 athletes (84%) represented Ireland. In 2016, eight represented Great Britain and 21 represented Ireland.

All athletes from the whole of Ireland were included in the Great Britain team up until the 1920 Olympics as the entire island was part of the United Kingdom at that time. Hence the Team GB claim to have won at least one gold at every Summer Games is partially founded on a single Irish athlete, Tom Kiely, who won gold in the 1904 St. Louis games. While Kiely himself objected to the designation, considering himself simply Irish, Olympic historians recognise his medal as won by Great Britain and Ireland, thus maintaining the unique British record.

The existence of a Great Britain team has been criticised by Welsh and Scottish nationalists, advocating for separate Welsh and Scottish Olympic teams instead.

Other nations that formed part of the then British Empire, however, were represented separately even before full independence in a variety of ways, either as fledgling nations such as South Africa and India, or occasionally in regional teams such as Australasia and British West Indies.

== Hosted games ==
The United Kingdom has hosted the Summer Games on three occasions – 1908, 1948 and 2012, all in London – second only to the United States. At the 2016 Summer Olympics in Rio, Great Britain became the first team to win more medals at a Summer Olympics immediately after hosting a Summer Olympics; they won 67 medals overall, coming in second place in the medal table ahead of China, two more than in London in 2012. This success came 20 years after finishing 36th in the medal table, after winning just one gold and fourteen other medals at the 1996 Summer Olympics in Atlanta, which led to significant changes in the management and funding of British sports and facilities.

London also won the right to host the 1944 Summer Olympics. However, the 1944 games were cancelled due to the Second World War.

=== Successful bids ===
Games	Host city	Dates	Nations	Participants	Events
1908 Summer Olympics	London	27 April – 31 October	22	2,008	110
1944 Summer Olympics	London	Cancelled			
1948 Summer Olympics	London	29 July – 14 August	59	4,104	136
2012 Summer Olympics	London	27 July – 12 August	204	10,820	302

=== Unsuccessful bids ===
Games	City	Winner of bid
1992 Summer Olympics	Birmingham	Barcelona, Spain
1996 Summer Olympics	Manchester	Atlanta, United States
2000 Summer Olympics	Manchester	Sydney, Australia

=== Potential future bids ===
In February 2019, the Mayor of London Sadiq Khan announced plans to bid for the 2032 or 2036 Olympics, which was backed by UK Sport. However, it has been speculated that either Manchester or Birmingham may be in the frame to host future games, rather than London. In July 2021, the 2032 Games were awarded to Brisbane.

In July 2024, Khan revealed he was to attend the opening ceremony of the 2024 Summer Olympics in Paris and would use the opportunity to lobby members of the British Olympic Association and the Prime Minister (a potential bid would need to be both underwritten by the government and backed by the BOA) into hosting the 2040 Olympics. He claimed London could host the "greenest games ever" by reusing venues from the 2012 games including the London Stadium, the London Aquatics Centre, Lee Valley Velopark and Copper Box Arena. The idea was backed by Tom Daley, Team GB diver, commenting that "London is one of the few cities on the planet where you would be able to host the games tomorrow".

A 2025 proposal by the Heseltine Institute would see Manchester and Liverpool launch a joint bid for the 2040 Games - this idea was backed by the Mayor of Greater Manchester Andy Burnham, who described the prospect of the two cities hosting the games as an opportunity to 'rebalance the country'.

== Medal tables ==
=== Medals by Summer Games ===
Host country

Games	Athletes	Gold	Silver	Bronze	Total	Rank
(Kingdom of Greece) 1896 Athens	10	2	3	2	7	5
(French Third Republic) 1900 Paris	101	20	8	9	37	3
(United States) 1904 St. Louis	3	1	1	0	2	9
(United Kingdom) 1908 London	676	56	51	39	146	1
(Sweden) 1912 Stockholm	274	10	15	16	41	3
(Belgium) 1920 Antwerp	234	14	15	13	42	3
(French Third Republic) 1924 Paris	267	9	13	12	34	4
(Netherlands) 1928 Amsterdam	232	3	10	7	20	11
(United States) 1932 Los Angeles	108	4	7	5	16	8
(Nazi Germany) 1936 Berlin	208	4	7	3	14	10
(United Kingdom) 1948 London	404	3	14	6	23	12
(Finland) 1952 Helsinki	257	1	2	8	11	18
(Australia) 1956 Melbourne	189	6	7	11	24	8
(Italy) 1960 Rome	253	2	6	12	20	12
(Japan) 1964 Tokyo	204	4	12	2	18	10
1968 Mexico City	225	5	5	3	13	10
(West Germany) 1972 Munich	284	4	5	9	18	12
(Canada) 1976 Montreal	242	3	5	5	13	13
(Soviet Union) 1980 Moscow	219	5	7	9	21	9
(United States) 1984 Los Angeles	337	5	11	21	37	11
(South Korea) 1988 Seoul	345	5	10	9	24	12
(Spain) 1992 Barcelona	371	5	3	12	20	13
(United States) 1996 Atlanta	300	1	8	6	15	36
(Australia) 2000 Sydney	310	11	10	7	28	10
(Greece) 2004 Athens	264	9	9	12	30	10
(China) 2008 Beijing	313	19	13	19	51	4
(United Kingdom) 2012 London	541	29	18	18	65	3
(Brazil) 2016 Rio de Janeiro	366	27	23	17	67	2
(Japan) 2020 Tokyo	376	22	20	22	64	4
(France) 2024 Paris	327	14	22	29	65	7
(United States) 2028 Los Angeles	future event					
(Australia) 2032 Brisbane	future event					
Total (30/30)	8,240	303	340	343	986	3

Notes

- ^{NAT} Australian Frederick Lane competed at the 1900 Summer Olympics, winning two gold medals in the swimming events. As a representative of a British club, his participation and medals were attributed accordingly. Conversely, British Lloyd Hildebrand won a silver medal in the 25 km cycling event. As a representative of a French club, his participation and medal were attributed to France.
- ^{MIX} At the 1900 Summer Olympics four team event medals (3 gold and 1 silver) won by British clubs competing as mixed teams—composed primarily of British athletes alongside a few non-British participants—were attributed to Great Britain: gold in the 5000 metres team race, polo, and water polo and silver in polo.
- ^{ART} Art competitions (1912–1948) are not included in the medal table above, as they were non-sports events formerly part of the Olympic Games. (Note: In 1952, art competition medals, as well as the gold medal awards for feats in alpinism and aeronautics, were removed from the official national medal counts. Only since 2021 have they been officially listed again by the IOC in the medal tables and respective NOC profile on its website. Great Britain won a total of nine art competition medals (3 gold, 5 silver and 1 bronze), across the 1920, 1924, 1928, 1932 and 1948 Summer Olympics.) Great Britain won a total of nine art competition medals (3 gold, 5 silver and 1 bronze), across the 1920, 1924, 1928, 1932 and 1948 Summer Olympics.

=== Medals by Winter Games ===
Games	Athletes	Gold	Silver	Bronze	Total	Rank
(France) 1924 Chamonix	44	1	1	2	4	6
(Switzerland) 1928 St. Moritz	32	0	0	1	1	8
(United States) 1932 Lake Placid	4	0	0	0	0	–
(Nazi Germany) 1936 Garmisch-Partenkirchen	38	1	1	1	3	7
(Switzerland) 1948 St. Moritz	55	0	0	2	2	13
(Norway) 1952 Oslo	18	1	0	0	1	8
(Italy) 1956 Cortina d'Ampezzo	41	0	0	0	0	–
(United States) 1960 Squaw Valley	17	0	0	0	0	–
(Austria) 1964 Innsbruck	36	1	0	0	1	11
(France) 1968 Grenoble	38	0	0	0	0	–
(Japan) 1972 Sapporo	37	0	0	0	0	–
(Austria) 1976 Innsbruck	42	1	0	0	1	12
(United States) 1980 Lake Placid	48	1	0	0	1	11
(Socialist Federal Republic of Yugoslavia) 1984 Sarajevo	50	1	0	0	1	11
(Canada) 1988 Calgary	48	0	0	0	0	–
(France) 1992 Albertville	49	0	0	0	0	–
(Norway) 1994 Lillehammer	32	0	0	2	2	21
(Japan) 1998 Nagano	34	0	0	1	1	22
(United States) 2002 Salt Lake City	49	1	0	1	2	18
(Italy) 2006 Turin	41	0	1	0	1	21
(Canada) 2010 Vancouver	50	1	0	0	1	19
(Russia) 2014 Sochi	56	1	1	3	5	19
(South Korea) 2018 Pyeongchang	58	1	0	4	5	19
(China) 2022 Beijing	50	1	1	0	2	19
(Italy) 2026 Milano Cortina	53	3	1	1	5	15
(France) 2030 French Alps	future event					
(United States) 2034 Utah	future event					
Total (25/25)	1,020	15	6	18	39	18

=== Medals by summer sport ===
Leading in that sport

Sport / Discipline	Gold	Silver	Bronze	Total
Athletics	57	87	77	221
Track cycling	34	28	24	86
Rowing	34	27	17	78
Sailing	31	21	13	65
Swimming	23	33	30	86
Boxing	20	15	28	63
Tennis	17	14	12	43
Shooting	14	16	19	49
Equestrian eventing	7	8	8	23
Equestrian jumping	5	3	5	13
Triathlon	4	3	4	11
Field hockey	4	2	7	13
Modern pentathlon	4	2	3	9
Water polo	4	0	0	4
Freestyle wrestling	3	4	10	17
Polo	3	4	1	8
Artistic gymnastics	3	3	12	18
Canoe sprint	3	1	5	9
Equestrian dressage	3	1	5	9
Football	3	0	0	3
Road cycling	2	9	6	17
Canoe slalom	2	9	3	14
Diving	2	4	12	18
Taekwondo	2	4	4	10
Archery	2	2	5	9
Rackets	2	2	3	7
Tug of war	2	2	1	5
Mountain biking	2	0	0	2
Water motorsports	2	0	0	2
Fencing	1	8	0	9
Weightlifting	1	4	4	9
Golf	1	2	1	4
BMX freestyle	1	1	1	3
Trampoline gymnastics	1	1	1	3
BMX racing	1	1	0	2
Cricket	1	0	0	1
Sport climbing	1	0	0	1
Judo	0	8	12	20
Marathon swimming	0	2	1	3
Rugby union	0	2	0	2
Badminton	0	1	2	3
Jeu de paume	0	1	1	2
Artistic swimming	0	1	0	1
Field lacrosse	0	1	0	1
Rugby sevens	0	1	0	1
Skateboarding	0	0	2	2
Totals (46 entries)	302	338	339	979

This table excludes seven medals – one gold, two silver and four bronze – awarded in the 1908 and 1920 figure skating events.

=== Medals by winter sport ===
Sport / Discipline	Gold	Silver	Bronze	Total
Figure skating	5	3	7	15
Skeleton	5	1	5	11
Curling	3	3	1	7
Bobsleigh	1	1	3	5
Snowboarding	1	0	2	3
Ice hockey	1	0	1	2
Freestyle skiing	0	0	2	2
Short track speed skating	0	0	1	1
Totals (8 entries)	16	8	22	46

This table includes seven medals – one gold, two silver and four bronze – awarded in the 1908 and 1920 figure skating events.

=== Best results in non-medalling sports and disciplines ===
Summer
Sport	Rank	Athlete	Event & Year
3x3 basketball	–	–	–
Baseball	–	–	–
Basketball	9th	Great Britain men's team	Men's tournament in 2012
Basque pelota	–	–	–
Beach volleyball	9th	Audrey Cooper & Amanda Glover	Women's tournament in 1996
Breaking	–	–	–
Croquet	–	–	–
Equestrian driving	–	–	–
Equestrian vaulting	–	–	–
Field handball	–	–	–
Greco-Roman wrestling	4th	Launceston Elliot	Men's Greco-Roman in 1896
Indoor handball	12th	Great Britain men's team	Men's tournament in 2012
Indoor handball	12th	Great Britain women's team	Women's tournament in 2012
Indoor volleyball	9th	Great Britain women's team	Women's tournament in 2012
Karate	–	–	–
Rhythmic gymnastics	12th	Georgina Cassar; Jade Faulkner; Francesca Fox; Lynne Hutchison; Louisa Pouli; Rachel Smith	Women's rhythmic group all-around in 2012
Roque	–	–	–
Softball	–	–	–
Surfing	–	–	–
Table tennis	5th	Liam Pitchford; Paul Drinkhall; Sam Walker	Men's team in 2016
Winter
Sport	Rank	Athlete	Event & Year
Alpine skiing	4th	Gina Hathorn	Women's slalom in 1968
Biathlon	11th	Keith Oliver	Individual in 1972
Cross-country skiing	5th	Andrew Musgrave & James Clugnet	Men's team sprint in 2026
Luge	14th	Derek Prentice & Christopher Dyason	Doubles in 1980
Military patrol	–	–	–
Nordic combined	45th	Percy Legard	Nordic combined in 1936
Ski jumping	55th	Eddie Edwards	Large hill individual in 1988
Ski jumping	55th	Glynn Pedersen	Normal hill individual in 2002
Ski mountaineering - sprint	–	–	–
Speed skating	5th	Terry Monaghan	Men's 10,000 metres in 1960

== List of Winter Olympic medallists ==
This list also contains the medals won in winter sports at the 1908 and 1920 Summer Olympics, which are not counted in the overall winter Olympic total.

Medal	Name(s)	Games	Sport	Event
Gold	Madge Syers	1908 London	Figure skating	Ladies' singles
Gold	William Jackson; Thomas Murray; Robin Welsh; Laurence Jackson	1924 Chamonix	Curling	Men's event
Gold	Great Britain men's national ice hockey team	1936 Garmisch-Partenkirchen	Ice hockey	Men's event
Gold	Jeannette Altwegg	1952 Oslo	Figure skating	Ladies' singles
Gold	Robin Dixon; Tony Nash	1964 Innsbruck	Bobsleigh	Two man
Gold	John Curry	1976 Innsbruck	Figure skating	Men's singles
Gold	Robin Cousins	1980 Lake Placid	Figure skating	Men's singles
Gold	Jayne Torvill; Christopher Dean	1984 Sarajevo	Figure skating	Ice dancing
Gold	Rhona Martin; Debbie Knox; Fiona MacDonald; Janice Rankin; Margaret Morton	2002 Salt Lake City	Curling	Women's event
Gold	Amy Williams	2010 Vancouver	Skeleton	Women's event
Gold	Lizzy Yarnold	2014 Sochi	Skeleton	Women's event
Gold	Lizzy Yarnold	2018 Pyeongchang	Skeleton	Women's event
Gold	Eve Muirhead; Vicky Wright; Jennifer Dodds; Hailey Duff; Mili Smith	2022 Beijing	Curling	Women's event
Gold	Matt Weston	2026 Milano Cortina	Skeleton	Men's event
Gold	Huw Nightingale; Charlotte Bankes	2026 Milano Cortina	Snowboarding	Mixed team snowboard cross
Gold	Tabitha Stoecker; Matt Weston	2026 Milano Cortina	Skeleton	Mixed team
Silver	Phyllis Johnson; James H. Johnson	1908 London	Figure skating	Pairs Skating
Silver	Arthur Cumming	1908 London	Figure skating	Men's special figures
Silver	Ralph Broome; Thomas Arnold; Alexander Richardson; Rodney Soher	1924 Chamonix	Bobsleigh	Four man
Silver	Cecilia Colledge	1936 Garmisch-Partenkirchen	Figure skating	Ladies' singles
Silver	Shelley Rudman	2006 Turin	Skeleton	Women's event
Silver	David Murdoch; Greg Drummond; Scott Andrews; Michael Goodfellow; Tom Brewster	2014 Sochi	Curling	Men's event
Silver	Bruce Mouat; Grant Hardie; Bobby Lammie; Hammy McMillan Jr. Ross Whyte	2022 Beijing	Curling	Men's event
Silver	Bruce Mouat; Grant Hardie; Bobby Lammie; Hammy McMillan Jr. Kyle Waddell	2026 Milano Cortina	Curling	Men's event
Bronze	Geoffrey Hall-Say	1908 London	Figure skating	Men's special figures
Bronze	Dorothy Greenhough-Smith	1908 London	Figure skating	Ladies' singles
Bronze	Madge Syers; Edgar Syers	1908 London	Figure skating	Pairs skating
Bronze	Phyllis Johnson; Basil Williams	1920 Antwerp	Figure skating	Pairs Skating
Bronze	Ethel Muckelt	1924 Chamonix	Figure skating	Ladies' singles
Bronze	Great Britain men's national ice hockey team	1924 Chamonix	Ice hockey	Men's event
Bronze	David Carnegie	1928 St. Moritz	Skeleton	Men's event
Bronze	Frederick McEvoy; James Cardno; Guy Dugdale; Charles Green	1936 Garmisch-Partenkirchen	Bobsleigh	Four man
Bronze	Jeannette Altwegg	1948 St. Moritz	Figure skating	Ladies' singles
Bronze	John Crammond	1948 St. Moritz	Skeleton	Men's event
Bronze	Nicky Gooch	1994 Lillehammer	Short track speed skating	Men's 500m
Bronze	Jayne Torvill; Christopher Dean	1994 Lillehammer	Figure skating	Ice dancing
Bronze	Sean Olsson; Dean Ward; Courtney Rumbolt; Paul Attwood	1998 Nagano	Bobsleigh	Four man
Bronze	Alex Coomber	2002 Salt Lake City	Skeleton	Women's event
Bronze	Jenny Jones	2014 Sochi	Snowboarding	Women's slopestyle
Bronze	Eve Muirhead; Anna Sloan; Vicki Adams; Claire Hamilton; Lauren Gray	2014 Sochi	Curling	Women's event
Bronze	John James Jackson; Bruce Tasker; Stuart Benson; Joel Fearon	2014 Sochi	Bobsleigh	Four man
Bronze	Dominic Parsons	2018 Pyeongchang	Skeleton	Men's event
Bronze	Laura Deas	2018 Pyeongchang	Skeleton	Women's event
Bronze	Billy Morgan	2018 Pyeongchang	Snowboarding	Men's Big air
Bronze	Izzy Atkin	2018 Pyeongchang	Freestyle skiing	Women's slopestyle
Bronze	Zoe Atkin	2026 Milano Cortina	Freestyle skiing	Women's halfpipe

=== Multiple medallists ===
The following athletes have won more than one medal for Great Britain at the Winter Olympics, or in winter disciplines. Bold denotes athletes that have not yet retired.

Athlete	Sport	Years	Gender	1st place, gold medalist(s)	2nd place, silver medalist(s)	3rd place, bronze medalist(s)	Total
Matt Weston	Skeleton	2026	M	2	0	0	2
Lizzy Yarnold	Skeleton	2014–2018	F	2	0	0	2
Eve Muirhead	Curling	2014–2022	F	1	0	1	2
Christopher Dean	Figure skating	1984–1994	M	1	0	1	2
Jayne Torvill	Figure skating	1984–1994	F	1	0	1	2
Jeannette Altwegg	Figure skating	1948–1952	F	1	0	1	2
Madge Syers	Figure skating	1908	F	1	0	1	2
Bruce Mouat	Curling	2022–2026	M	0	2	0	2
Grant Hardie	Curling	2022–2026	M	0	2	0	2
Bobby Lammie	Curling	2022–2026	M	0	2	0	2
Hammy McMillan Jr.	Curling	2022–2026	M	0	2	0	2
Phyllis Johnson	Figure skating	1908–1920	F	0	1	1	2

=== Stripped medal ===
Great Britain's only stripped medal in Winter Olympic history was an Alpine Skiing bronze at the 2002 Winter Olympics in Salt Lake City. Alain Baxter tested positive for a banned substance, resulting from Baxter using a branded inhaler product bought in Salt Lake City which, unknown to him, contained different chemicals in the United States than in his native country. While the British version contained no banned substances, the American version did, albeit in small amounts. Baxter was exonerated of deliberate wrongdoing, but was forced to return his medal on the basis of strict liability.

Medal	Name(s)	Games	Sport	Event
Bronze	Alain Baxter	2002 Salt Lake City	Alpine Skiing	Men's slalom

== Medals by individual ==
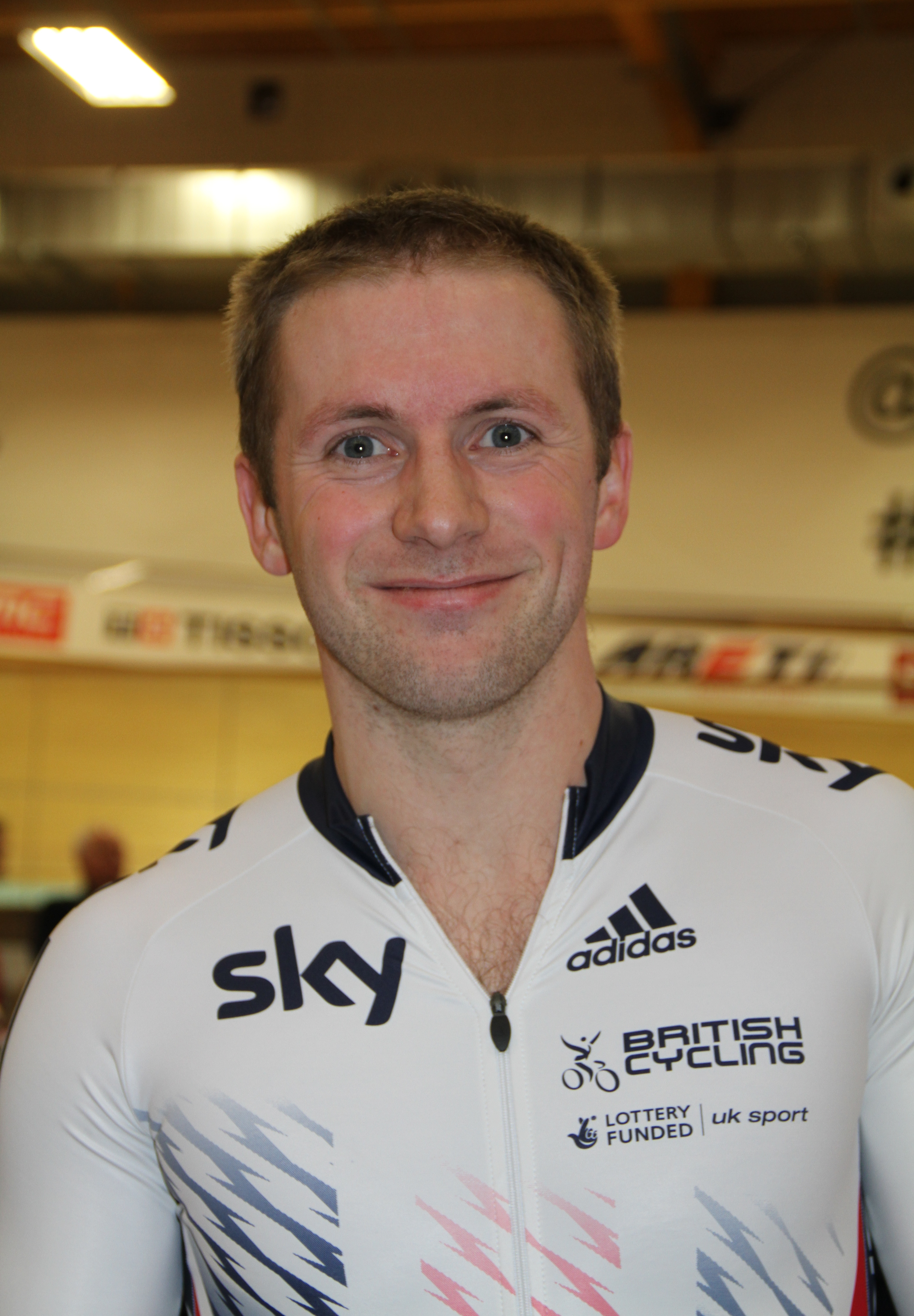
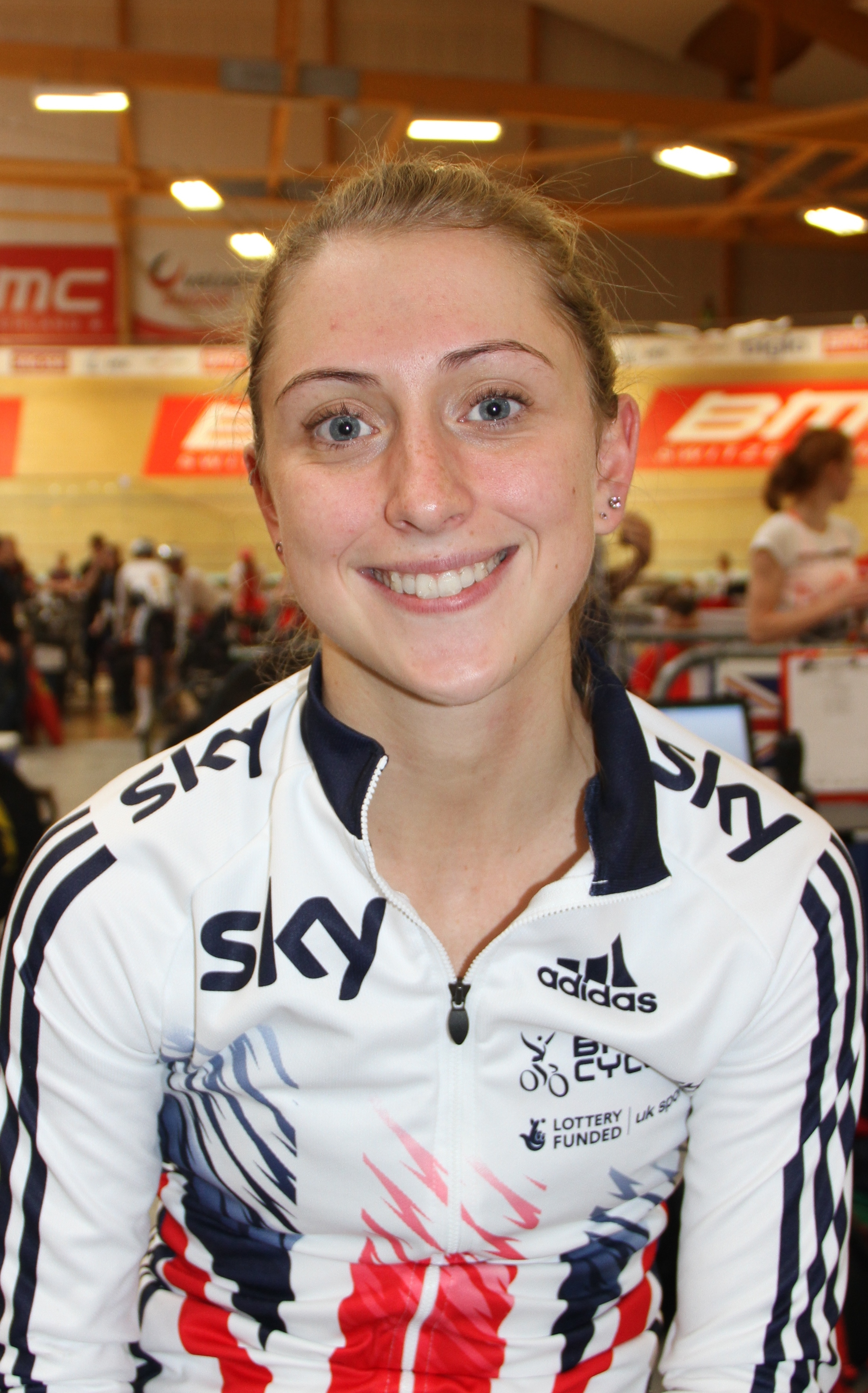

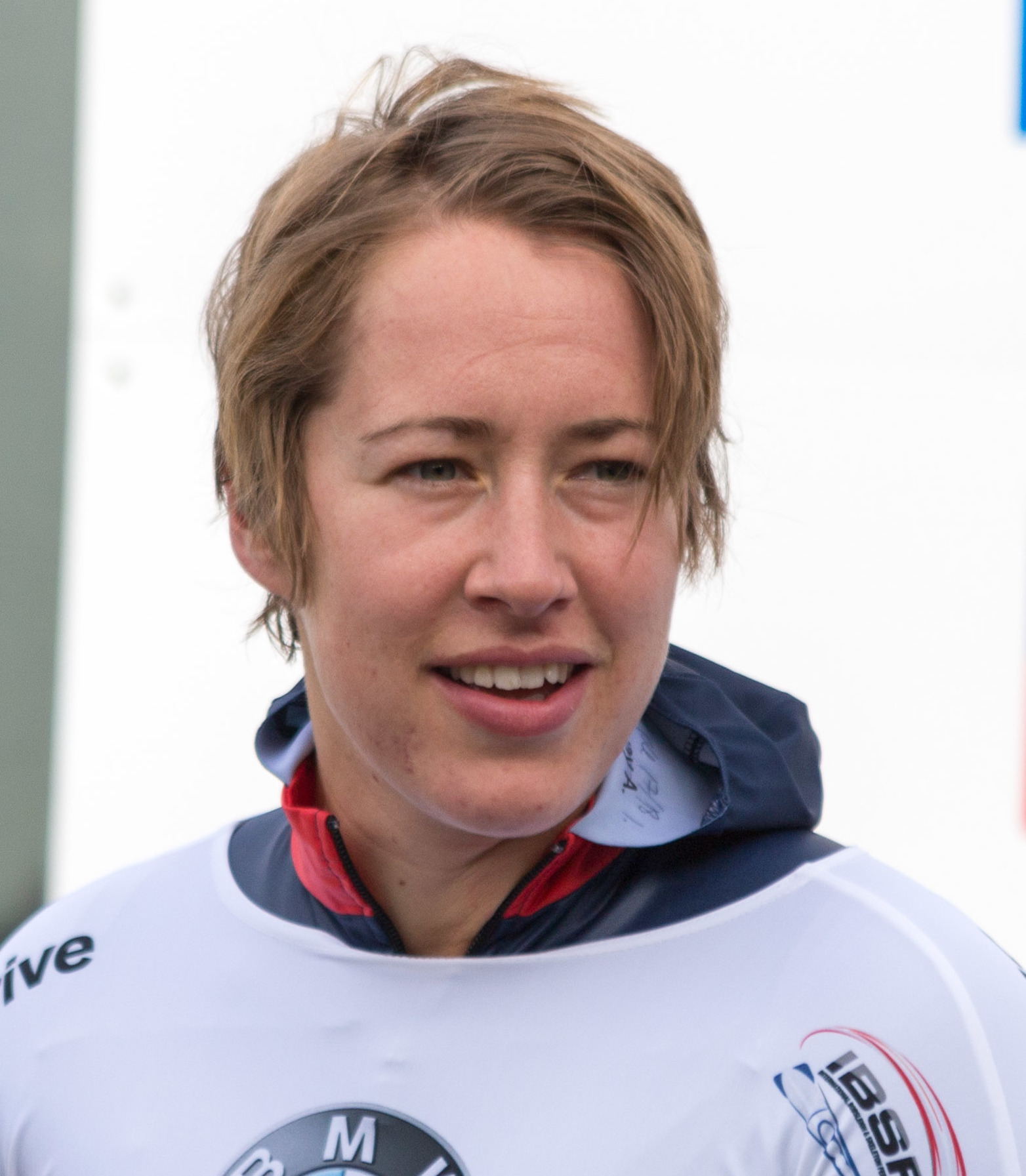
Jason Kenny (top) has won the most gold medals of any British Olympian, with seven; his wife Laura Kenny (centre) has the most gold medals of any female British Olympian, with five. Lizzy Yarnold (bottom) is the most successful British Winter Olympian, with two gold medals.

According to official data of the International Olympic Committee. This is a list of people who have won at least three Olympic gold medals or four Olympic medals for Great Britain. Medals won in the 1906 Intercalated Games are not included. It includes top-three placings in 1896 and 1900, before medals were awarded for top-three placings.

Athlete	Sport	Years	Games	Gender	1st place, gold medalist(s)	2nd place, silver medalist(s)	3rd place, bronze medalist(s)	Total
Jason Kenny	Track cycling	2008–2020	Summer	M	7	2	0	9
Chris Hoy	Track cycling	2000–2012	Summer	M	6	1	0	7
Bradley Wiggins	Track cycling Road cycling	2000–2016	Summer	M	5	1	2	8
Laura Kenny	Track cycling	2012–2020	Summer	F	5	1	0	6
Steve Redgrave	Rowing	1984–2000	Summer	M	5	0	1	6
Ben Ainslie	Sailing	1996–2012	Summer	M	4	1	0	5
Mo Farah	Athletics	2012–2016	Summer	M	4	0	0	4
Matthew Pinsent	Rowing	1992–2004	Summer	M	4	0	0	4
Paulo Radmilovic	Water polo Swimming	1908–1920	Summer	M	4	0	0	4
**James Guy**	Swimming	2016–2024	Summer	M	3	3	0	6
**Adam Peaty**	Swimming	2016–2024	Summer	M	3	3	0	6
Jack Beresford	Rowing	1920–1936	Summer	M	3	2	0	5
**Charlotte Dujardin**	Equestrian (dressage)	2012–2020	Summer	F	3	1	2	6
**Max Whitlock**	Artistic gymnastics	2012–2020	Summer	M	3	0	3	6
Henry Taylor	Swimming	1908–1920	Summer	M	3	0	2	5
Ed Clancy	Track cycling	2008–2016	Summer	M	3	0	1	4
Reginald Doherty	Tennis	1900–1908	Summer	M	3	0	1	4
**Tom Dean**	Swimming	2020–2024	Summer	M	3	0	0	3
**Ben Maher**	Equestrian (jumping)	2012–2024	Summer	M	3	0	0	3
Richard Meade	Equestrian (eventing)	1968–1972	Summer	M	3	0	0	3
Pete Reed	Rowing	2008–2016	Summer	M	3	0	0	3
Charles Sydney Smith	Water polo	1908–1920	Summer	M	3	0	0	3
Andrew Triggs Hodge	Rowing	2008–2016	Summer	M	3	0	0	3
4 Olympic medals or more and fewer than 3 Olympic golds
**Duncan Scott**	Swimming	2016–2024	Summer	M	2	6	0	8
Sebastian Coe	Athletics	1980–1984	Summer	M	2	2	0	4
**Alex Yee**	Triathlon	2020–2024	Summer	M	2	1	1	4
Rebecca Adlington	Swimming	2008–2012	Summer	F	2	0	2	4
Katherine Grainger	Rowing	2000–2016	Summer	F	1	4	0	5
Kathleen McKane Godfree	Tennis	1920–1924	Summer	F	1	2	2	5
**Elinor Barker**	Track cycling	2016–2024	Summer	F	1	2	1	4
Tom Daley	Diving	2012–2024	Summer	M	1	1	3	5
Guy Butler	Athletics	1920–1924	Summer	M	1	1	2	4
Charles Dixon	Tennis	1908–1912	Summer	M	1	1	2	4
Liam Heath	Canoe sprint	2012–2020	Summer	M	1	1	2	4
**Carl Hester**	Equestrian (dressage)	2012–2024	Summer	M	1	1	2	4
**Jack Laugher**	Diving	2016–2024	Summer	M	1	1	2	4
Christine Ohuruogu	Athletics	2008–2016	Summer	F	1	1	2	4
Jack Carlin	Track cycling	2020–2024	Summer	M	0	2	2	4
Ginny Elliott	Equestrian (eventing)	1984–1988	Summer	F	0	2	2	4
Louis Smith	Artistic gymnastics	2008–2016	Summer	M	0	2	2	4
Joyce Cooper	Swimming	1928–1932	Summer	F	0	1	3	4

- **People in bold** are still active competitors

Lizzy Yarnold and Matt Weston are the most successful British athletes at the Winter Olympics, with two gold medals each. Duncan Scott is the most prolific athlete at a single Games, winning four medals (1 gold, 3 silver) at the 2020 Olympics. Steve Redgrave is the most consistent British Olympic athlete, winning gold medals at five consecutive Games (1984–2000).

The most successful 'individual' British Olympians, that is an athlete who competes in individual events, are Sir Jason Kenny, Sir Chris Hoy, Sir Mo Farah and Sir Ben Ainslie, all with four gold medals apiece in individual events, with Kenny's silver in individual match sprint and Ainslee's silver in his first games giving them the top position. With four golds and a silver in five individual events in five consecutive games, Ainslie is also the most consistent, and with Kenny, most decorated, individual athlete in British Olympic history.

Sir Chris Hoy has the unique distinction of achieving gold medals in four different events; twice in team sprint, twice in kierin, once in individual sprint and once in the kilometre time trial. Fellow cyclists Jason Kenny and Ed Clancey, in contrast have won the same event on three occasions, the team sprint and team pursuit respectively. Ben Ainslee in the sailing Finn class and Paulo Radmilovic in water polo have also won three gold medals in the same event. Dame Laura Kenny, wife of Sir Jason, has the unique distinction of winning the first ever edition of three different events - the women's team pursuit, women's omnium and women's madison.

=== Most successful British Olympian progression ===
This table shows how the designation of most successful British Olympian has progressed over time. This table ranks athletes by golds, then silvers, then bronzes; the progression would be different if ranked purely by medals.

Athlete	Sport	Date	Gender	1st place, gold medalist(s)	2nd place, silver medalist(s)	3rd place, bronze medalist(s)	Total
Launceston Elliot	Weightlifting	7 April 1896	M	1	0	0	1
Launceston Elliot	Weightlifting	7 April 1896	M	1	1	0	2
Lorne Currie	Sailing	25 May 1900	M	2	0	0	2
John Gretton	Sailing	25 May 1900	M	2	0	0	2
Linton Hope	Sailing	25 May 1900	M	2	0	0	2
Algernon Maudslay	Sailing	25 May 1900	M	2	0	0	2
Laurence Doherty	Tennis	11 July 1900	M	2	0	0	2
Reginald Doherty	Tennis	28 August 1900	M	2	0	1	3
Reginald Doherty	Tennis	11 July 1908	M	3	0	1	4
Henry Taylor	Swimming	15 July 1912	M	3	0	1	4
Paul Radmilovic	Swimming; Water polo	29 August 1920	M	4	0	0	4
Steve Redgrave	Rowing	21 July 1996	M	4	0	1	5
Steve Redgrave	Rowing	23 September 2000	M	5	0	1	6
Chris Hoy	Track cycling	2 August 2012	M	5	1	0	6
Chris Hoy	Track cycling	7 August 2012	M	6	1	0	7
**Jason Kenny**	Track cycling	16 August 2016	M	6	1	0	7
**Jason Kenny**	Track cycling	3 August 2021	M	6	2	0	8
**Jason Kenny**	Track cycling	8 August 2021	M	7	2	0	9

=== Most successful in their sport ===
As of the 2026 Winter Olympics, the following athletes are the most successful (ordered by golds, then silvers, then bronzes) in their sport:

- Jason Kenny (Track cycling)
- Ben Ainslie (Sailing)
- Alex Yee (Triathlon)
- Lizzy Yarnold, Matt Weston (Skeleton)
- John Wodehouse (Polo)
- John Astor (Rackets)
- John Shepherd, Frederick Humphreys and Edwin Mills (Tug of War)
- John Field-Richards, Bernard Boverton Redwood and Isaac Thomas Thornycroft (Water Motorsports)
- Twelve members of the Devon and Somerset Wanderers team (Cricket)

Steve Redgrave and Reginald Doherty are the most successful male athletes in their respective sports, Rowing and Tennis. Five-time gold medalist Laura Kenny is the most successful female cyclist and Hannah Mills with two gold medals and a silver is the most successful woman in sailing. Nicola Adams, with two golds, shares the title of most successful woman in Boxing.

== Medals by sport ==
=== Alpine skiing ===
Year	Skiers	Events	Gold	Silver	Bronze	Total	Rank
1936	8	2	0	0	0	0	–
1948	13	6	0	0	0	0	–
1952	7	6	0	0	0	0	–
1956	14	6	0	0	0	0	–
1960	8	6	0	0	0	0	–
1964	11	6	0	0	0	0	–
1968	10	6	0	0	0	0	–
1972	8	6	0	0	0	0	–
1976	10	6	0	0	0	0	–
1980	9	6	0	0	0	0	–
1984	8	6	0	0	0	0	–
1988	12	10	0	0	0	0	–
1992	12	10	0	0	0	0	–
1994	6	10	0	0	0	0	–
1998	6	10	0	0	0	0	–
2002	6	10	0	0	0	0	–
2006	6	10	0	0	0	0	–
2010	4	10	0	0	0	0	–
2014	2	10	0	0	0	0	–
2018	4	11	0	0	0	0	–
2022	4	11	0	0	0	0	–
2026	3	10	0	0	0	0	–
Total			0	0	0	0	–

=== Archery ===
Year	Archers	Events	Gold	Silver	Bronze	Total	Rank
1900	Did not compete						
1904	Did not compete						
1908	41	3	2	2	1	5	1
1912	No Competition						
1920	Did not compete						
1924–1968	No Competition						
1972	6	2	0	0	0	0	–
1976	4	2	0	0	0	0	–
1980	4	2	0	0	0	0	–
1984	6	2	0	0	0	0	–
1988	6	4	0	0	1	1	4
1992	6	4	0	0	2	2	6
1996	3	4	0	0	0	0	–
2000	3	4	0	0	0	0	–
2004	4	4	0	0	1	1	6
2008	6	4	0	0	0	0	–
2012	6	4	0	0	0	0	–
2016	2	4	0	0	0	0	–
2020	6	5	0	0	0	0	–
2024	6	5	0	0	0	0	–
2028							
Total			2	2	5	9	5

==== Medallists ====
Medal	Name	Games	Sport	Event
Gold	William Dod	1908 London	Archery	Men's double York round
Silver	Reginald Brooks-King	1908 London	Archery	Men's double York round
Gold	Queenie Newall	1908 London	Archery	Women's double National round
Silver	Lottie Dod	1908 London	Archery	Women's double National round
Bronze	Beatrice Hill-Lowe	1908 London	Archery	Women's double National round
Bronze	Steven Hallard; Richard Priestman; Leroy Watson	1988 Seoul	Archery	Men's team
Bronze	Steven Hallard; Richard Priestman; Simon Terry	1992 Barcelona	Archery	Men's team
Bronze	Simon Terry	1992 Barcelona	Archery	Men's individual
Bronze	Alison Williamson	2004 Athens	Archery	Women's individual

=== Artistic swimming ===
Great Britain appeared in the first synchronised swimming competition in 1984.

Year	Swimmers	Events	Gold	Silver	Bronze	Total	Rank
1984	2	2	0	0	0	0	–
1988	2	2	0	0	0	0	–
1992	2	2	0	0	0	0	–
1996–2004	Did not compete						
2008	2	2	0	0	0	0	–
2012	8	2	0	0	0	0	–
2016	2	2	0	0	0	0	–
2020	2	2	0	0	0	0	–
2024	2	2	0	1	0	1	2
2028							
Total			0	1	0	1	8

==== Medallists ====
Medal	Name	Games	Sport	Event
Silver	Kate Shortman; Isabelle Thorpe	2024 Paris	Artistic swimming	Women's duet

=== Athletics ===
Year	Athletes	Events	Gold	Silver	Bronze	Total	Rank
1896	5		0	1	1	2	5
1900	9		3	3	2	8	2
1904	3		1	1	0	2	2
1908	126		7	7	3	17	2
1912	61		2	1	5	8	4
1920	41		4	4	4	12	3
1924	65		3	3	5	11	3
1928	55		2	2	1	5	4
1932	24		2	4	2	8	5
1936	52		2	5	0	7	4
1948	79		0	6	1	7	14
1952	66		0	1	4	5	5
1956	55		1	4	2	7	4
1960	61		1	3	4	8	6
1964	62		4	7	1	12	3
1968	68		1	2	1	4	9
1972	70		1	1	2	4	7
1976	52		0	0	1	1	20
1980	61		4	2	4	10	3
1984	85		3	7	6	16	3
1988	102		0	6	2	8	13
1992	91		2	0	4	6	6
1996	77		0	4	2	6	25
2000	72		2	2	2	6	6
2004	54		3	0	1	4	3
2008	58		1	2	5	8	8
2012	69		4	2	0	6	3
2016	80	47	2	1	4	7	6
2020	77	48	0	2	3	5	24
2024	63	48	1	4	5	10	7
2028							
Total			56	87	77	220	3

==== Medallists ====
Medal	Name	Games	Sport	Event
Bronze	Charles Gmelin	1896 Athens	Athletics	Men's 400 metres
Silver	Grantley Goulding	1896 Athens	Athletics	Men's 110 metres hurdles
Gold	Alfred Tysoe	1900 Paris	Athletics	Men's 800 metres
Gold	Charles Bennett	1900 Paris	Athletics	Men's 1500 metres
Silver	Sidney Robinson	1900 Paris	Athletics	Men's 2500 metres steeplechase
Gold	John Rimmer	1900 Paris	Athletics	Men's 4000 metres steeplechase
Silver	Charles Bennett	1900 Paris	Athletics	Men's 4000 metres steeplechase
Bronze	Sidney Robinson	1900 Paris	Athletics	Men's 4000 metres steeplechase
Silver	Patrick Leahy	1900 Paris	Athletics	Men's high jump
Bronze	Patrick Leahy	1900 Paris	Athletics	Men's long jump
Silver	John Daly	1904 St. Louis	Athletics	Men's 2590 metres steeplechase
Gold	Tom Kiely	1904 St. Louis	Athletics	Men's all-around
Gold	Wyndham Halswelle	1908 London	Athletics	Men's 400 metres
Silver	Harold Wilson	1908 London	Athletics	Men's 1500 metres
Bronze	Norman Hallows	1908 London	Athletics	Men's 1500 metres
Gold	Emil Voigt	1908 London	Athletics	Men's 5 miles
Silver	Edward Owen	1908 London	Athletics	Men's 5 miles
Bronze	Jimmy Tremeer	1908 London	Athletics	Men's 400 metres hurdles
Gold	Arthur Russell	1908 London	Athletics	Men's 3200 metres steeplechase
Silver	Arthur Robertson	1908 London	Athletics	Men's 3200 metres steeplechase
Gold	William Coales; Joe Deakin; Arthur Robertson	1908 London	Athletics	Men's 3 miles team race
Gold	George Larner	1908 London	Athletics	Men's 3500 metres walk
Silver	Ernest Webb	1908 London	Athletics	Men's 3500 metres walk
Gold	George Larner	1908 London	Athletics	Men's 10 miles walk
Silver	Ernest Webb	1908 London	Athletics	Men's 10 miles walk
Bronze	Edward Spencer	1908 London	Athletics	Men's 10 miles walk
Gold	Tim Ahearne	1908 London	Athletics	Men's triple jump
Silver	Con Leahy	1908 London	Athletics	Men's high jump
Silver	Denis Horgan	1908 London	Athletics	Men's shot put
Bronze	Willie Applegarth	1912 Stockholm	Athletics	Men's 200 metres
Gold	Arnold Jackson	1912 Stockholm	Athletics	Men's 1500 metres
Bronze	George Hutson	1912 Stockholm	Athletics	Men's 5000 metres
Gold	Willie Applegarth; Victor d'Arcy; David Jacobs; Henry Macintosh	1912 Stockholm	Athletics	Men's 4 x 100 metres relay
Bronze	Ernest Henley; George Nicol; Cyril Seedhouse; James Soutter	1912 Stockholm	Athletics	Men's 4 x 400 metres relay
Bronze	Joe Cottrill; George Hutson; William Moore; Edward Owen; Cyril Porter	1912 Stockholm	Athletics	Men's 3000 metres team race
Silver	Ernest Webb	1912 Stockholm	Athletics	Men's 10 kilometres walk
Bronze	Ernest Glover; Frederick Hibbins; Thomas Humphreys	1912 Stockholm	Athletics	Men's team cross country
Bronze	Harry Edward	1920 Antwerp	Athletics	Men's 100 metres
Bronze	Harry Edward	1920 Antwerp	Athletics	Men's 200 metres
Silver	Guy Butler	1920 Antwerp	Athletics	Men's 400 metres
Gold	Albert Hill	1920 Antwerp	Athletics	Men's 800 metres
Gold	Albert Hill	1920 Antwerp	Athletics	Men's 1500 metres
Silver	Philip Noel-Baker	1920 Antwerp	Athletics	Men's 1500 metres
Bronze	James Wilson	1920 Antwerp	Athletics	Men's 10,000 metres
Gold	Percy Hodge	1920 Antwerp	Athletics	Men's 3000 metres steeplechase
Gold	Cecil Griffiths; Robert Lindsay; John Ainsworth-Davis; Guy Butler	1920 Antwerp	Athletics	Men's 4 x 400 metres relay
Silver	Joe Blewitt; Albert Hill; William Seagrove	1920 Antwerp	Athletics	Men's 3000 metres team race
Bronze	Charles Gunn	1920 Antwerp	Athletics	Men's 10 kilometres walk
Silver	James Wilson; Anton Hegarty; Alfred Nichols	1920 Antwerp	Athletics	Men's team cross country
Gold	Harold Abrahams	1924 Paris	Athletics	Men's 100 metres
Bronze	Eric Liddell	1924 Paris	Athletics	Men's 200 metres
Gold	Eric Liddell	1924 Paris	Athletics	Men's 400 metres
Bronze	Guy Butler	1924 Paris	Athletics	Men's 400 metres
Gold	Douglas Lowe	1924 Paris	Athletics	Men's 800 metres
Bronze	H. B. Stallard	1924 Paris	Athletics	Men's 1500 metres
Silver	Harold Abrahams; Walter Rangeley; Wilfred Nichol; Lancelot Royle	1924 Paris	Athletics	Men's 4 x 100 metres relay
Bronze	Edward Toms; George Renwick; Richard Ripley; Guy Butler	1924 Paris	Athletics	Men's 4 x 400 metres relay
Silver	Bertram Macdonald; Herbert Johnston; George Webber	1924 Paris	Athletics	Men's 3000 metres team race
Silver	Gordon Goodwin	1924 Paris	Athletics	Men's 10 kilometres walk
Bronze	Malcolm Nokes	1924 Paris	Athletics	Men's hammer throw
Silver	Jack London	1928 Amsterdam	Athletics	Men's 100 metres
Silver	Walter Rangeley	1928 Amsterdam	Athletics	Men's 200 metres
Gold	Douglas Lowe	1928 Amsterdam	Athletics	Men's 800 metres
Gold	David Burghley	1928 Amsterdam	Athletics	Men's 400 metres hurdles
Bronze	Cyril Gill; Edward Smouha; Walter Rangeley; Jack London	1928 Amsterdam	Athletics	Men's 4 x 100 metres relay
Gold	Tommy Hampson	1932 Los Angeles	Athletics	Men's 800 metres
Silver	Jerry Cornes	1932 Los Angeles	Athletics	Men's 1500 metres
Bronze	Donald Finlay	1932 Los Angeles	Athletics	Men's 110 metres hurdles
Silver	Thomas Evenson	1932 Los Angeles	Athletics	Men's 3000 metres steeplechase
Silver	Crew Stoneley; Tommy Hampson; David Burghley; Godfrey Rampling	1932 Los Angeles	Athletics	Men's 4 x 400 metres relay
Silver	Thomas Evenson	1932 Los Angeles	Athletics	Men's marathon
Gold	Tommy Green	1932 Los Angeles	Athletics	Men's 50 kilometres walk
Bronze	Nellie Halstead; Eileen Hiscock; Gwendoline Porter; Violet Webb	1932 Los Angeles	Athletics	Women's 4 x 100 metres relay
Silver	Godfrey Brown	1936 Berlin	Athletics	Men's 400 metres
Silver	Don Finlay	1936 Berlin	Athletics	Men's 110 metres hurdles
Gold	Freddie Wolff; Godfrey Rampling; Bill Roberts; Godfrey Brown	1936 Berlin	Athletics	Men's 4 x 400 metres relay
Silver	Ernest Harper	1936 Berlin	Athletics	Men's marathon
Gold	Harold Whitlock	1936 Berlin	Athletics	Men's 50 kilometres walk
Silver	Eileen Hiscock; Violet Olney; Audrey Brown; Barbara Burke	1936 Berlin	Athletics	Women's 4 x 100 metres relay
Silver	Dorothy Odam	1936 Berlin	Athletics	Women's high jump
Silver	Alastair McCorquodale; John Gregory; Ken Jones; Jack Archer	1948 London	Athletics	Men's 4 x 100 metres relay
Silver	Tom Richards	1948 London	Athletics	Men's marathon
Bronze	Tebbs Lloyd Johnson	1948 London	Athletics	Men's 50 kilometres walk
Silver	Dorothy Manley	1948 London	Athletics	Women's 100 metres
Silver	Audrey Williamson	1948 London	Athletics	Women's 200 metres
Silver	Maureen Gardner	1948 London	Athletics	Women's 80 metres hurdles
Silver	Dorothy Tyler	1948 London	Athletics	Women's high jump
Bronze	McDonald Bailey	1952 Helsinki	Athletics	Men's 100 metres
Bronze	John Disley	1952 Helsinki	Athletics	Men's 3000 metres steeplechase
Bronze	Sylvia Cheeseman; June Foulds; Jean Desforges; Heather Armitage	1952 Helsinki	Athletics	Women's 4 x 100 metres relay
Silver	Sheila Lerwill	1952 Helsinki	Athletics	Women's high jump
Bronze	Shirley Cawley	1952 Helsinki	Athletics	Women's long jump
Silver	Derek Johnson	1956 Melbourne	Athletics	Men's 800 metres
Silver	Gordon Pirie	1956 Melbourne	Athletics	Men's 5000 metres
Bronze	Derek Ibbotson	1956 Melbourne	Athletics	Men's 5000 metres
Gold	Chris Brasher	1956 Melbourne	Athletics	Men's 3000 metres steeplechase
Bronze	Peter Higgins; Derek Johnson; John Salisbury; Michael Wheeler	1956 Melbourne	Athletics	Men's 4 x 400 metres relay
Silver	Heather Armitage; Anne Pashley; June Paul; Jean Scrivens	1956 Melbourne	Athletics	Women's 4 x 100 metres relay
Silver	Thelma Hopkins	1956 Melbourne	Athletics	Women's high jump
Bronze	Peter Radford	1960 Rome	Athletics	Men's 100 metres
Bronze	Peter Radford; David Jones; David Segal; Nick Whitehead	1960 Rome	Athletics	Men's 4 x 100 metres relay
Bronze	Stan Vickers	1960 Rome	Athletics	Men's 20 kilometres walk
Gold	Don Thompson	1960 Rome	Athletics	Men's 50 kilometres walk
Silver	Dorothy Hyman	1960 Rome	Athletics	Women's 100 metres
Bronze	Dorothy Hyman	1960 Rome	Athletics	Women's 200 metres
Silver	Carole Quinton	1960 Rome	Athletics	Women's 80 metres hurdles
Silver	Dorothy Shirley	1960 Rome	Athletics	Women's high jump
Silver	John Cooper	1964 Tokyo	Athletics	Men's 400 metres hurdles
Silver	Maurice Herriott	1964 Tokyo	Athletics	Men's 3000 metres steeplechase
Silver	Tim Graham; Adrian Metcalfe; John Cooper; Robbie Brightwell	1964 Tokyo	Athletics	Men's 4 x 400 metres relay
Silver	Basil Heatley	1964 Tokyo	Athletics	Men's marathon
Gold	Ken Matthews	1964 Tokyo	Athletics	Men's 20 kilometres walk
Silver	Paul Nihill	1964 Tokyo	Athletics	Men's 50 kilometres walk
Gold	Lynn Davies	1964 Tokyo	Athletics	Men's long jump
Silver	Ann Packer	1964 Tokyo	Athletics	Women's 400 metres
Gold	Ann Packer	1964 Tokyo	Athletics	Women's 800 metres
Bronze	Janet Simpson; Mary Rand; Daphne Arden; Dorothy Hyman	1964 Tokyo	Athletics	Women's 4 x 100 metres relay
Gold	Mary Rand	1964 Tokyo	Athletics	Women's long jump
Silver	Mary Rand	1964 Tokyo	Athletics	Women's pentathlon
Gold	David Hemery	1968 Mexico City	Athletics	Men's 400 metres hurdles
Bronze	John Sherwood	1968 Mexico City	Athletics	Men's 400 metres hurdles
Silver	Lillian Board	1968 Mexico City	Athletics	Women's 400 metres
Silver	Sheila Sherwood	1968 Mexico City	Athletics	Women's long jump
Bronze	Ian Stewart	1972 Munich	Athletics	Men's 5000 metres
Bronze	David Hemery	1972 Munich	Athletics	Men's 400 metres hurdles
Bronze	Martin Reynolds; Alan Pascoe; David Hemery; David Jenkins	1972 Munich	Athletics	Men's 4 x 400 metres relay
Gold	Mary Peters	1972 Munich	Athletics	Women's pentathlon
Bronze	Brendan Foster	1976 Montreal	Athletics	Men's 10,000 metres
Gold	Allan Wells	1980 Moscow	Athletics	Men's 100 metres
Silver	Allan Wells	1980 Moscow	Athletics	Men's 200 metres
Gold	Steve Ovett	1980 Moscow	Athletics	Men's 800 metres
Silver	Sebastian Coe	1980 Moscow	Athletics	Men's 800 metres
Gold	Sebastian Coe	1980 Moscow	Athletics	Men's 1500 metres
Bronze	Steve Ovett	1980 Moscow	Athletics	Men's 1500 metres
Bronze	Gary Oakes	1980 Moscow	Athletics	Men's 400 metres hurdles
Gold	Daley Thompson	1980 Moscow	Athletics	Men's decathlon
Bronze	Heather Hunte; Kathy Smallwood; Beverley Goddard; Sonia Lannaman	1980 Moscow	Athletics	Women's 4 x 100 metres relay
Bronze	Linsey MacDonald; Michelle Probert; Joslyn Hoyte-Smith; Donna Hartley	1980 Moscow	Athletics	Women's 4 x 400 metres relay
Silver	Sebastian Coe	1984 Los Angeles	Athletics	Men's 800 metres
Gold	Sebastian Coe	1984 Los Angeles	Athletics	Men's 1500 metres
Silver	Steve Cram	1984 Los Angeles	Athletics	Men's 1500 metres
Silver	Mike McLeod	1984 Los Angeles	Athletics	Men's 10,000 metres
Silver	Kriss Akabusi; Garry Cook; Todd Bennett; Phil Brown	1984 Los Angeles	Athletics	Men's 4 x 400 metres relay
Bronze	Charlie Spedding	1984 Los Angeles	Athletics	Men's marathon
Bronze	Keith Connor	1984 Los Angeles	Athletics	Men's triple jump
Silver	David Ottley	1984 Los Angeles	Athletics	Men's javelin throw
Gold	Daley Thompson	1984 Los Angeles	Athletics	Men's decathlon
Bronze	Kathy Smallwood-Cook	1984 Los Angeles	Athletics	Women's 400 metres
Silver	Wendy Smith-Sly	1984 Los Angeles	Athletics	Women's 3000 metres
Silver	Shirley Strong	1984 Los Angeles	Athletics	Women's 100 metres hurdles
Bronze	Simmone Jacobs; Kathy Smallwood-Cook; Beverley Goddard; Heather Hunte	1984 Los Angeles	Athletics	Women's 4 x 100 metres relay
Bronze	Susan Hearnshaw	1984 Los Angeles	Athletics	Women's long jump
Gold	Tessa Sanderson	1984 Los Angeles	Athletics	Women's javelin throw
Bronze	Fatima Whitbread	1984 Los Angeles	Athletics	Women's javelin throw
Silver	Linford Christie	1988 Seoul	Athletics	Men's 100 metres
Silver	Peter Elliott	1988 Seoul	Athletics	Men's 800 metres
Silver	Colin Jackson	1988 Seoul	Athletics	Men's 110 metres hurdles
Bronze	Mark Rowland	1988 Seoul	Athletics	Men's 3000 metres steeplechase
Silver	Elliot Bunney; John Regis; Linford Christie; Mike McFarlane	1988 Seoul	Athletics	Men's 4 x 100 metres relay
Bronze	Yvonne Murray	1988 Seoul	Athletics	Women's 3000 metres
Silver	Liz McColgan	1988 Seoul	Athletics	Women's 10,000 metres
Silver	Fatima Whitbread	1988 Seoul	Athletics	Women's javelin throw
Gold	Linford Christie	1992 Barcelona	Athletics	Men's 100 metres
Bronze	Kriss Akabusi	1992 Barcelona	Athletics	Men's 400 metres hurdles
Bronze	Roger Black; David Grindley; Kriss Akabusi; John Regis; Du'aine Ladejo*; Mark Richardson*	1992 Barcelona	Athletics	Men's 4 x 400 metres relay
Bronze	Steve Backley	1992 Barcelona	Athletics	Men's javelin throw
Gold	Sally Gunnell	1992 Barcelona	Athletics	Women's 400 metres hurdles
Bronze	Phylis Smith; Sandra Douglas; Jennifer Stoute; Sally Gunnell	1992 Barcelona	Athletics	Women's 4 x 400 metres relay
Silver	Roger Black	1996 Atlanta	Athletics	Men's 400 metres
Silver	Iwan Thomas; Jamie Baulch; Mark Richardson; Roger Black; Mark Hylton*; Du'aine Ladejo*	1996 Atlanta	Athletics	Men's 4 x 400 metres relay
Bronze	Steve Smith	1996 Atlanta	Athletics	Men's high jump
Silver	Jonathan Edwards	1996 Atlanta	Athletics	Men's triple jump
Silver	Steve Backley	1996 Atlanta	Athletics	Men's javelin throw
Bronze	Denise Lewis	1996 Atlanta	Athletics	Women's heptathlon
Silver	Darren Campbell	2000 Sydney	Athletics	Men's 200 metres
Gold	Jonathan Edwards	2000 Sydney	Athletics	Men's triple jump
Silver	Steve Backley	2000 Sydney	Athletics	Men's javelin throw
Bronze	Katharine Merry	2000 Sydney	Athletics	Women's 400 metres
Bronze	Kelly Holmes	2000 Sydney	Athletics	Women's 800 metres
Gold	Denise Lewis	2000 Sydney	Athletics	Women's heptathlon
Gold	Jason Gardener; Darren Campbell; Marlon Devonish; Mark Lewis-Francis	2004 Athens	Athletics	Men's 4 x 100 metres relay
Gold	Kelly Holmes	2004 Athens	Athletics	Women's 800 metres
Gold	Kelly Holmes	2004 Athens	Athletics	Women's 1500 metres
Bronze	Kelly Sotherton	2004 Athens	Athletics	Women's heptathlon
Bronze	Martyn Rooney; Andrew Steele; Robert Tobin; Michael Bingham	2008 Beijing	Athletics	Men's 4 x 400 metres relay
Silver	Germaine Mason	2008 Beijing	Athletics	Men's high jump
Silver	Phillips Idowu	2008 Beijing	Athletics	Men's triple jump
Gold	Christine Ohuruogu	2008 Beijing	Athletics	Women's 400 metres
Bronze	Tasha Danvers	2008 Beijing	Athletics	Women's 400 metres hurdles
Bronze	Christine Ohuruogu; Kelly Sotherton; Marilyn Okoro; Nicola Sanders	2008 Beijing	Athletics	Women's 4 x 400 metres relay
Bronze	Goldie Sayers	2008 Beijing	Athletics	Women's javelin throw
Bronze	Kelly Sotherton	2008 Beijing	Athletics	Women's heptathlon
Gold	Mo Farah	2012 London	Athletics	Men's 5000 metres
Gold	Mo Farah	2012 London	Athletics	Men's 10,000 metres
Silver	Robbie Grabarz	2012 London	Athletics	Men's high jump
Gold	Greg Rutherford	2012 London	Athletics	Men's long jump
Silver	Christine Ohuruogu	2012 London	Athletics	Women's 400 metres
Gold	Jessica Ennis	2012 London	Athletics	Women's heptathlon
Gold	Mo Farah	2016 Rio de Janeiro	Athletics	Men's 5000 metres
Gold	Mo Farah	2016 Rio de Janeiro	Athletics	Men's 10,000 metres
Bronze	Greg Rutherford	2016 Rio de Janeiro	Athletics	Men's long jump
Bronze	Asha Philip; Desiree Henry; Dina Asher-Smith; Daryll Neita	2016 Rio de Janeiro	Athletics	Women's 4 x 100 metres relay
Bronze	Eilidh Doyle; Anyika Onuora; Emily Diamond; Christine Ohuruogu; Kelly Massey*	2016 Rio de Janeiro	Athletics	Women's 4 x 400 metres relay
Bronze	Sophie Hitchon	2016 Rio de Janeiro	Athletics	Women's hammer throw
Silver	Jessica Ennis-Hill	2016 Rio de Janeiro	Athletics	Women's heptathlon
Bronze	Josh Kerr	2020 Tokyo	Athletics	Men's 1500 metres
Silver	Keely Hodgkinson	2020 Tokyo	Athletics	Women's 800 metres
Silver	Laura Muir	2020 Tokyo	Athletics	Women's 1500 metres
Bronze	Asha Philip; Imani-Lara Lansiquot; Dina Asher-Smith; Daryll Neita	2020 Tokyo	Athletics	Women's 4 x 100 metres relay
Bronze	Holly Bradshaw	2020 Tokyo	Athletics	Women's pole vault
Silver	Matthew Hudson-Smith	2024 Paris	Athletics	Men's 400 metres
Silver	Josh Kerr	2024 Paris	Athletics	Men's 1500 metres
Bronze	Jeremiah Azu; Louie Hinchliffe; Nethaneel Mitchell-Blake; Zharnel Hughes; Richard Kilty*	2024 Paris	Athletics	Men's 4 x 100 metres relay
Bronze	Alex Haydock-Wilson; Matthew Hudson-Smith; Lewis Davey; Charlie Dobson; Samuel Reardon*; Toby Harries*	2024 Paris	Athletics	Men's 4 x 400 metres relay
Gold	Keely Hodgkinson	2024 Paris	Athletics	Women's 800 metres
Bronze	Georgia Bell	2024 Paris	Athletics	Women's 1500 metres
Silver	Dina Asher-Smith; Imani-Lara Lansiquot; Amy Hunt; Daryll Neita; Bianca Williams*; Desirèe Henry*	2024 Paris	Athletics	Women's 4 x 100 metres relay
Bronze	Victoria Ohuruogu; Laviai Nielsen; Nicole Yeargin; Amber Anning; Yemi Mary John*; Hannah Kelly*; Jodie Williams*; Lina Nielsen*	2024 Paris	Athletics	Women's 4 x 400 metres relay
Silver	Katarina Johnson-Thompson	2024 Paris	Athletics	Women's heptathlon
Bronze	Sam Reardon; Laviai Nielsen; Alex Haydock-Wilson; Amber Anning; Nicole Yeargin*	2024 Paris	Athletics	Mixed 4 x 400 metres relay

=== Badminton ===
Great Britain has competed in all Badminton events held at the Summer Olympics since badminton made its full debut as an Olympic sport in 1992.

Year	Players	Events	Gold	Silver	Bronze	Total	Rank
1972 (demonstration)	6	3	1	0	2	3	2
1976–1988	No Competition						
1992	12	4	0	0	0	0	–
1996	22	5	0	0	0	0	–
2000	16	5	0	0	1	1	5
2004	13	5	0	1	0	1	4
2008	6	5	0	0	0	0	–
2012	8	5	0	0	0	0	–
2016	8	5	0	0	1	1	8
2020	7	5	0	0	0	0	–
2024	3	5	0	0	0	0	–
Total			0	1	2	3	7

The figures from 1972 do not count towards the total as badminton was a demonstration sport.

==== Medallists ====
Medal	Name	Games	Sport	Event
Bronze	Simon Archer; Joanne Goode	2000 Sydney	Badminton	Mixed doubles
Silver	Gail Emms; Nathan Robertson	2004 Athens	Badminton	Mixed doubles
Bronze	Chris Langridge; Marcus Ellis	2016 Rio de Janeiro	Badminton	Men's doubles

=== Basketball ===
Year	Players	Events	Gold	Silver	Bronze	Total	Rank
1936	Did not compete						
1948	13	1	0	0	0	0	–
1952–2008	Did not compete						
2012	24	2	0	0	0	0	–
2016–2024	Did not compete						
Total			0	0	0	0	–

=== Biathlon ===
Year	Skiers	Events	Gold	Silver	Bronze	Total	Rank
1928 (demonstration)	Did not compete						
1932	Sport not held						
1936 (demonstration)	Did not compete						
1948 (demonstration)	Did not compete						
1952–1956	Sport not held						
1960	2	1	0	0	0	0	–
1964	4	1	0	0	0	0	–
1968	5	2	0	0	0	0	–
1972	4	2	0	0	0	0	–
1976	4	2	0	0	0	0	–
1980	4	3	0	0	0	0	–
1984	6	3	0	0	0	0	–
1988	4	3	0	0	0	0	–
1992	5	6	0	0	0	0	–
1994	4	6	0	0	0	0	–
1998	2	6	0	0	0	0	–
2002	4	8	0	0	0	0	–
2006	2	10	0	0	0	0	–
2010	1	10	0	0	0	0	–
2014	2	11	0	0	0	0	–
2018	1	11	0	0	0	0	–
2022	Did not compete						
2026	2	11	0	0	0	0	-
Total			0	0	0	0	–

=== Bobsleigh ===
Year	Bobsledders	Events	Gold	Silver	Bronze	Total	Rank
1924	8	1	0	1	0	1	2
1928	10	1	0	0	0	0	–
1932	Did not compete						
1936	4	2	0	0	1	1	3
1948	10	2	0	0	0	0	–
1952	Did not compete						
1956	8	2	0	0	0	0	–
1964	8	2	1	0	0	1	1
1968	8	2	0	0	0	0	–
1972	8	2	0	0	0	0	–
1976	8	2	0	0	0	0	–
1980	10	2	0	0	0	0	–
1984	10	2	0	0	0	0	–
1988	8	2	0	0	0	0	–
1992	8	2	0	0	0	0	–
1994	8	2	0	0	0	0	–
1998	7	2	0	0	1	1	5
2002	14	3	0	0	0	0	–
2006	6	3	0	0	0	0	–
2010	8	3	0	0	0	0	–
2014	8	3	0	0	1	1	5
2018	10	3	0	0	0	0	–
2022	6	4	0	0	0	0	–
2026	6	4	0	0	0	0	–
Total			1	1	3	5	9

=== Boxing ===
Great Britain made its Olympic boxing debut in 1908.

Year	Boxers	Events	Gold	Silver	Bronze	Total	Rank
1896–1900	No competition						
1904	Did not compete						
1908	32	5	5	4	5	14	1
1912	No competition						
1920	16	8	2	1	3	6	2
1924	16	8	2	2	0	4	2
1928	8	8	0	0	0	0	–
1932	3	8	0	0	0	0	–
1936	8	8	0	0	0	0	–
1948	8	8	0	2	0	2	6
1952	10	10	0	0	0	0	–
1956	7	10	2	1	2	5	1
1960	10	10	0	0	3	3	9
1964	8	10	0	0	0	0	–
1968	9	11	1	0	0	1	5
1972	9	11	0	0	3	3	15
1976	7	11	0	0	1	1	10
1980	9	11	0	0	1	1	11
1984	12	12	0	0	1	1	14
1988	8	12	0	0	1	1	15
1992	10	12	0	0	1	1	15
1996	2	12	0	0	0	0	–
2000	2	12	1	0	0	1	7
2004	1	11	0	1	0	1	8
2008	7	11	1	0	2	3	6
2012	10	13	3	1	1	5	1
2016	12	13	1	1	1	3	6
2020	11	13	2	2	2	6	2
2024	6	13	0	0	1	1	20
Total			20	15	28	63	3

==== Medallists ====
Medal	Name	Games	Sport	Event
Gold	A. Henry Thomas	1908 London	Boxing	Bantamweight (-52.6 kg / 116 lb)
Silver	John Condon	1908 London	Boxing	Bantamweight (-52.6 kg / 116 lb)
Bronze	William Webb	1908 London	Boxing	Bantamweight (-52.6 kg / 116 lb)
Gold	Richard Gunn	1908 London	Boxing	Featherweight (-57.2 kg / 126 lb)
Silver	Charles Morris	1908 London	Boxing	Featherweight (-57.2 kg / 126 lb)
Bronze	Hugh Roddin	1908 London	Boxing	Featherweight (-57.2 kg / 126 lb)
Gold	Frederick Grace	1908 London	Boxing	Lightweight (-63.5 kg / 140 lb)
Silver	Frederick Spiller	1908 London	Boxing	Lightweight (-63.5 kg / 140 lb)
Bronze	Harry Johnson	1908 London	Boxing	Lightweight (-63.5 kg / 140 lb)
Gold	Johnny Douglas	1908 London	Boxing	Middleweight (-71.7 kg / 158 lb)
Bronze	William Philo	1908 London	Boxing	Middleweight (-71.7 kg / 158 lb)
Gold	Albert Oldman	1908 London	Boxing	Heavyweight (over 71.7 kg/158 lb)
Silver	Sydney Evans	1908 London	Boxing	Heavyweight (over 71.7 kg/158 lb)
Bronze	Frank Parks	1908 London	Boxing	Heavyweight (over 71.7 kg/158 lb)
Bronze	William Cuthbertson	1920 Antwerp	Boxing	Flyweight (−50.8 kg / 112 lb)
Bronze	George McKenzie	1920 Antwerp	Boxing	Bantamweight (−53.5 kg / 118 lb)
Silver	Alexander Ireland	1920 Antwerp	Boxing	Welterweight (−66.7 kg / 147 lb)
Gold	Harry Mallin	1920 Antwerp	Boxing	Middleweight (−72.6 kg / 160 lb)
Bronze	Harold Franks	1920 Antwerp	Boxing	Light heavyweight (−79.4 kg / 175 lb)
Gold	Ronald Rawson	1920 Antwerp	Boxing	Heavyweight (over 79.4 kg/175 lb)
Silver	James McKenzie	1924 Paris	Boxing	Flyweight (−50.8 kg / 112 lb)
Gold	Harry Mallin	1924 Paris	Boxing	Middleweight (−72.6 kg / 160 lb)
Silver	John Elliott	1924 Paris	Boxing	Middleweight (−72.6 kg / 160 lb)
Gold	Harry Mitchell	1924 Paris	Boxing	Light heavyweight (−79.4 kg / 175 lb)
Silver	John Wright	1948 London	Boxing	Middleweight (−73 kg)
Silver	Don Scott	1948 London	Boxing	Light heavyweight (−80 kg)
Gold	Terence Spinks	1956 Melbourne	Boxing	Flyweight (−51 kg)
Silver	Thomas Nicholls	1956 Melbourne	Boxing	Featherweight (−57 kg)
Gold	Richard McTaggart	1956 Melbourne	Boxing	Lightweight (−60 kg)
Bronze	Nicholas Gargano	1956 Melbourne	Boxing	Welterweight (−67 kg)
Bronze	John McCormack	1956 Melbourne	Boxing	Light middleweight (−71 kg)
Bronze	Richard McTaggart	1960 Rome	Boxing	Lightweight (−60 kg)
Bronze	Jimmy Lloyd	1960 Rome	Boxing	Welterweight (−67 kg)
Bronze	William Fisher	1960 Rome	Boxing	Light middleweight (−71 kg)
Gold	Chris Finnegan	1968 Mexico City	Boxing	Middleweight
Bronze	Ralph Evans	1972 Munich	Boxing	Light flyweight
Bronze	George Turpin	1972 Munich	Boxing	Bantamweight
Bronze	Alan Minter	1972 Munich	Boxing	Light middleweight
Bronze	Patrick Cowdell	1976 Montreal	Boxing	Bantamweight
Bronze	Tony Willis	1980 Moscow	Boxing	Light welterweight (63.5 kg)
Bronze	Robert Wells	1984 Los Angeles	Boxing	Super heavyweight (+ 91 kg)
Bronze	Richard Woodhall	1988 Seoul	Boxing	Light middleweight (- 71 kg)
Bronze	Robin Reid	1992 Barcelona	Boxing	Light middleweight
Gold	Audley Harrison	2000 Sydney	Boxing	Super heavyweight
Silver	Amir Khan	2004 Athens	Boxing	Lightweight
Gold	James DeGale	2008 Beijing	Boxing	Middleweight
Bronze	Tony Jeffries	2008 Beijing	Boxing	Light heavyweight
Bronze	David Price	2008 Beijing	Boxing	Super heavyweight
Gold	Luke Campbell	2012 London	Boxing	Men's bantamweight
Silver	Fred Evans	2012 London	Boxing	Men's welterweight
Bronze	Anthony Ogogo	2012 London	Boxing	Men's middleweight
Gold	Anthony Joshua	2012 London	Boxing	Men's super heavyweight
Gold	Nicola Adams	2012 London	Boxing	Women's flyweight
Bronze	Joshua Buatsi	2016 Rio de Janeiro	Boxing	Men's light heavyweight
Silver	Joe Joyce	2016 Rio de Janeiro	Boxing	Men's super heavyweight
Gold	Nicola Adams	2016 Rio de Janeiro	Boxing	Women's flyweight
Gold	Galal Yafai	2020 Tokyo	Boxing	Men's flyweight
Silver	Pat McCormack	2020 Tokyo	Boxing	Men's welterweight
Silver	Benjamin Whittaker	2020 Tokyo	Boxing	Men's light heavyweight
Bronze	Frazer Clarke	2020 Tokyo	Boxing	Men's super heavyweight
Bronze	Karriss Artingstall	2020 Tokyo	Boxing	Women's featherweight
Gold	Lauren Price	2020 Tokyo	Boxing	Women's middleweight
Bronze	Lewis Richardson	2024 Paris	Boxing	Men's 71 kg

=== Canoeing ===
Year	Canoeists	Events	Gold	Silver	Bronze	Total	Rank
1936	3	9	0	0	0	0	–
1948	7	9	0	0	0	0	–
1952	7	9	0	0	0	0	–
1956	3	9	0	0	0	0	–
1960	7	7	0	0	0	0	–
1964	5	7	0	0	0	0	–
1968	10	7	0	0	0	0	–
1972	20	11	0	0	0	0	–
1976	11	11	0	0	0	0	–
1980	11	11	0	0	0	0	–
1984	15	12	0	0	0	0	–
1988	17	12	0	0	0	0	–
1992	25	16	0	1	0	1	14
1996	17	16	0	0	0	0	–
2000	12	16	0	1	1	2	12
2004	9	16	0	1	2	3	12
2008	7	16	1	1	1	3	7
2012	15	16	2	1	1	4	3
2016	11	16	2	2	0	4	3
2020	8	16	0	1	1	2	12
2024	4	16	0	2	2	4	10
2028							
Total			5	10	8	23	17

==== Medallists ====
Medal	Name	Games	Sport	Event
Silver	Gareth Marriott	1992 Barcelona	Canoeing	Men's slalom C-1
Silver	Paul Ratcliffe	2000 Sydney	Canoeing	Men's slalom K-1
Bronze	Tim Brabants	2000 Sydney	Canoeing	Men's sprint K-1, 1000 metres
Silver	Campbell Walsh	2004 Athens	Canoeing	Men's slalom K-1
Bronze	Helen Reeves	2004 Athens	Canoeing	Women's slalom K-1
Bronze	Ian Wynne	2004 Athens	Canoeing	Men's sprint K-1, 500 metres
Silver	David Florence	2008 Beijing	Canoeing	Men's slalom C-1
Bronze	Tim Brabants	2008 Beijing	Canoeing	Men's sprint K--1, 500 metres
Gold	Tim Brabants	2008 Beijing	Canoeing	Men's sprint K--1, 1000 metres
Gold	Timothy Baillie; Etienne Stott	2012 London	Canoeing	Men's slalom C-2
Silver	David Florence; Richard Hounslow	2012 London	Canoeing	Men's slalom C-2
Gold	Ed McKeever	2012 London	Canoeing	Men's sprint K-1, 200 metres
Bronze	Liam Heath; Jon Schofield	2012 London	Canoeing	Men's sprint K-2, 200 metres
Silver	David Florence; Richard Hounslow	2016 Rio de Janeiro	Canoeing	Men's slalom C-2
Gold	Joe Clarke	2016 Rio de Janeiro	Canoeing	Men's slalom K-1
Gold	Liam Heath	2016 Rio de Janeiro	Canoeing	Men's sprint K-1, 200 metres
Silver	Liam Heath; Jon Schofield	2016 Rio de Janeiro	Canoeing	Men's sprint K-2, 200 metres
Silver	Mallory Franklin	2020 Tokyo	Canoeing	Women's slalom C-1
Bronze	Liam Heath	2020 Tokyo	Canoeing	Men's sprint K-1, 200 metres
Silver	Adam Burgess	2024 Paris	Canoeing	Men's slalom C-1
Silver	Joe Clarke	2024 Paris	Canoeing	Men's slalom KX-1
Bronze	Kimberley Woods	2024 Paris	Canoeing	Women's slalom K-1
Bronze	Kimberley Woods	2024 Paris	Canoeing	Women's slalom KX-1

=== Cricket ===
Great Britain and France were the only two teams to compete in the only Olympic cricket match, in 1900. The British team won, making them the only nation to win an Olympic cricket contest and the only Olympic gold medallists in cricket.

Year	Cricketers	Events	Gold	Silver	Bronze	Total	Rank
1900	12	1	1	0	0	1	1

=== Cross-country skiing ===
Year	Skiers	Events	Gold	Silver	Bronze	Total	Rank
1924–1932	Did not compete						
1936	1	3	0	0	0	0	–
1948–1952	Did not compete						
1956	8	6	0	0	0	0	–
1960	3	6	0	0	0	0	–
1964	6	7	0	0	0	0	–
1968–2006	Did not compete						
2010	3	12	0	0	0	0	–
2014	4	12	0	0	0	0	–
2018	4	12	0	0	0	0	–
2022	3	12	0	0	0	0	–
2026	4	12	0	0	0	0	–
Total			0	0	0	0	–

=== Curling ===
Year	Curlers	Events	Gold	Silver	Bronze	Total	Rank
1924	5	1	1	0	0	1	1
1928	No competition held						
1932 (demonstration)	Did not compete						
1936–1984	No competition held						
1988 (demonstration)	5	2	0	0	0	0	–
1992 (demonstration)	10	2	0	0	0	0	–
1994	No competition held						
1998	10	2	0	0	0	0	–
2002	10	2	1	0	0	1	1
2006	10	2	0	0	0	0	–
2010	10	2	0	0	0	0	–
2014	10	2	0	1	1	2	2
2018	10	3	0	0	0	0	–
2022	10	3	1	1	0	2	1
2026	10	3	0	1	0	1	4
Total			3	3	1	7	3

=== Cycling ===
Jason Kenny with seven gold and two silver medals is the most successful British Olympian, most successful British cyclist, indeed the most successful cyclist, in Olympic history. His wife, Laura Kenny is the most successful British female Olympian and most successful Olympic female cyclist in history, with five golds and one silver. As of 2021, of the 100 cycling medals won by Great Britain, half (50) have been won in the four Games since 2008, including 28 gold medals. Great Britain had won ten golds in total between 1896 and 2008.

Year	Cyclists	Events	Gold	Silver	Bronze	Total	Rank
1896	2	6	0	1	1	2	4
1900	Did not compete						
1904	Did not compete						
1908	36	7	5	3	1	9	1
1912	26	2	0	2	0	2	3
1920	13	6	1	3	1	5	1
1924	12	6	0	1	1	2	5
1928	12	6	0	3	1	4	5
1932	7	6	0	1	1	2	5
1936	11	6	0	0	1	1	6
1948	10	6	0	3	2	5	4
1952	12	6	0	0	1	1	6
1956	12	6	0	1	2	3	5
1960	12	6	0	0	0	0	–
1964	12	7	0	0	0	0	–
1968	14	7	0	0	0	0	–
1972	11	7	0	0	1	1	11
1976	11	6	0	0	1	1	12
1980	12	6	0	0	0	0	–
1984	16	8	0	0	0	0	–
1988	17	9	0	0	0	0	–
1992	16	10	1	0	0	1	4
1996	19	14	0	0	2	2	12
2000	22	18	1	1	2	4	6
2004	22	18	2	1	1	4	3
2008	25	18	8	4	2	14	1
2012	25	18	8	2	2	12	1
2016	26	18	6	4	2	12	1
2020	26	22	6	4	2	12	1
2024	30	22	2	5	4	11	5
2028							
Total			40	39	31	110	2

==== Medallists ====
Medal	Name	Games	Sport	Event
Bronze	Edward Battell	1896 Athens	Track cycling	Men's individual road race
Silver	Frederick Keeping	1896 Athens	Track cycling	Men's 12 hour race
Gold	Victor Johnson	1908 London	Track cycling	Men's 660 yards
Gold	Benjamin Jones	1908 London	Track cycling	Men's 5000 metres
Gold	Clarence Kingsbury	1908 London	Track cycling	Men's 20 kilometres
Silver	Benjamin Jones	1908 London	Track cycling	Men's 20 kilometres
Gold	Charles Bartlett	1908 London	Track cycling	Men's 100 kilometres
Silver	Charles Denny	1908 London	Track cycling	Men's 100 kilometres
Silver	Frederick Hamlin; Horace Johnson	1908 London	Track cycling	Men's tandem
Bronze	Charlie Brooks; Walter Isaacs	1908 London	Track cycling	Men's tandem
Gold	Benjamin Jones; Clarence Kingsbury; Leonard Meredith; Ernest Payne	1908 London	Track cycling	Men's team pursuit
Silver	Frederick Grubb	1912 Stockholm	Road cycling	Men's individual time trial
Silver	Frederick Grubb; Leonard Meredith; Charles Moss; William Hammond	1912 Stockholm	Road cycling	Men's team time trial
Silver	Horace Johnson	1920 Antwerp	Track cycling	Men's sprint
Bronze	Harry Ryan	1920 Antwerp	Track cycling	Men's sprint
Silver	Cyril Alden	1920 Antwerp	Track cycling	Men's 50 kilometres
Gold	Thomas Lance; Harry Ryan	1920 Antwerp	Track cycling	Men's tandem
Silver	Albert White; Cyril Alden; Horace Johnson; William Stewart	1920 Antwerp	Track cycling	Men's team pursuit
Silver	Cyril Alden	1924 Paris	Track cycling	Men's 50 kilometres
Bronze	Harry Wyld	1924 Paris	Track cycling	Men's 50 kilometres
Silver	Frank Southall	1928 Amsterdam	Road cycling	Men's individual road race
Silver	Jack Lauterwasser; John Middleton; Frank Southall	1928 Amsterdam	Road cycling	Men's team road race
Bronze	George Southall; Harry Wyld; Leonard Wyld; Percy Wyld	1928 Amsterdam	Track cycling	Men's team pursuit
Silver	Ernest Chambers; John Sibbit	1928 Amsterdam	Track cycling	Men's tandem
Bronze	Frank Southall; William Harvell; Charles Holland; Ernest Johnson	1932 Los Angeles	Track cycling	Men's team pursuit
Silver	Ernest Chambers; Stanley Chambers	1932 Los Angeles	Track cycling	Men's tandem
Bronze	Ernie Mills; Harry Hill; Ernest Johnson; Charles King	1936 Berlin	Track cycling	Men's team pursuit
Silver	Robert John Maitland; Ian Scott; Gordon Thomas; Ernie Clements	1948 London	Road cycling	Men's team road race
Bronze	Wilfred Waters; Robert Geldard; Tommy Godwin; David Ricketts	1948 London	Track cycling	Men's team pursuit
Silver	Reg Harris	1948 London	Track cycling	Men's sprint
Silver	Alan Bannister; Reg Harris	1948 London	Track cycling	Men's tandem
Bronze	Tommy Godwin	1948 London	Track cycling	Men's 1000 metre time trial
Bronze	Ronald Stretton; Donald Burgess; George Newberry; Alan Newton	1952 Helsinki	Track cycling	Men's team pursuit
Bronze	Alan Jackson	1956 Melbourne	Road cycling	Men's individual road race
Silver	Arthur Brittain; William Holmes; Alan Jackson	1956 Melbourne	Road cycling	Men's team road race
Bronze	Tom Simpson; Donald Burgess; Mike Gambrill; John Geddes	1956 Melbourne	Track cycling	Men's team pursuit
Bronze	William Moore; Michael Bennett; Ian Hallam; Ronald Keeble	1972 Munich	Track cycling	Men's team pursuit
Bronze	Ian Hallam; Ian Banbury; Michael Bennett; Robin Croker	1976 Montreal	Track cycling	Men's team pursuit
Gold	Chris Boardman	1992 Barcelona	Track cycling	Men's individual pursuit
Bronze	Max Sciandri	1996 Atlanta	Road cycling	Men's road race
Bronze	Chris Boardman	1996 Atlanta	Road cycling	Men's time trial
Bronze	Paul Manning; Chris Newton; Bryan Steel; Bradley Wiggins; Jon Clay; Rob Hayles	2000 Sydney	Track cycling	Men's team pursuit
Silver	Chris Hoy; Craig MacLean; Jason Queally	2000 Sydney	Track cycling	Men's team sprint
Gold	Jason Queally	2000 Sydney	Track cycling	Men's track time trial
Bronze	Yvonne McGregor	2000 Sydney	Track cycling	Women's individual pursuit
Bronze	Rob Hayles; Bradley Wiggins	2004 Athens	Track cycling	Men's madison
Gold	Bradley Wiggins	2004 Athens	Track cycling	Men's individual pursuit
Silver	Steve Cummings; Rob Hayles; Paul Manning; Bradley Wiggins	2004 Athens	Track cycling	Men's team pursuit
Gold	Chris Hoy	2004 Athens	Track cycling	Men's track time trial
Gold	Nicole Cooke	2008 Beijing	Road cycling	Women's road race
Silver	Emma Pooley	2008 Beijing	Road cycling	Women's time trial
Gold	Chris Hoy	2008 Beijing	Track cycling	Men's keirin
Silver	Ross Edgar	2008 Beijing	Track cycling	Men's keirin
Bronze	Chris Newton	2008 Beijing	Track cycling	Men's points race
Gold	Bradley Wiggins	2008 Beijing	Track cycling	Men's individual pursuit
Bronze	Steven Burke	2008 Beijing	Track cycling	Men's individual pursuit
Gold	Ed Clancy; Paul Manning; Geraint Thomas; Bradley Wiggins	2008 Beijing	Track cycling	Men's team pursuit
Gold	Chris Hoy	2008 Beijing	Track cycling	Men's sprint
Silver	Jason Kenny	2008 Beijing	Track cycling	Men's sprint
Gold	Jamie Staff; Jason Kenny; Chris Hoy	2008 Beijing	Track cycling	Men's team sprint
Gold	Rebecca Romero	2008 Beijing	Track cycling	Women's individual pursuit
Silver	Wendy Houvenaghel	2008 Beijing	Track cycling	Women's individual pursuit
Gold	Victoria Pendleton	2008 Beijing	Track cycling	Women's sprint
Gold	Bradley Wiggins	2012 London	Road cycling	Men's time trial
Bronze	Chris Froome	2012 London	Road cycling	Men's time trial
Silver	Lizzie Armitstead	2012 London	Road cycling	Women's road race
Gold	Chris Hoy	2012 London	Track cycling	Men's keirin
Bronze	Ed Clancy	2012 London	Track cycling	Men's omnium
Gold	Ed Clancy; Geraint Thomas; Steven Burke; Peter Kennaugh	2012 London	Track cycling	Men's team pursuit
Gold	Jason Kenny	2012 London	Track cycling	Men's sprint
Gold	Philip Hindes; Chris Hoy; Jason Kenny	2012 London	Track cycling	Men's team sprint
Gold	Victoria Pendleton	2012 London	Track cycling	Women's keirin
Gold	Laura Trott	2012 London	Track cycling	Women's omnium
Gold	Dani King; Laura Trott; Joanna Rowsell	2012 London	Track cycling	Women's team pursuit
Silver	Victoria Pendleton	2012 London	Track cycling	Women's sprint
Bronze	Chris Froome	2016 Rio de Janeiro	Road cycling	Men's time trial
Gold	Jason Kenny	2016 Rio de Janeiro	Track cycling	Men's keirin
Silver	Mark Cavendish	2016 Rio de Janeiro	Track cycling	Men's omnium
Gold	Ed Clancy; Steven Burke; Owain Doull; Bradley Wiggins	2016 Rio de Janeiro	Track cycling	Men's team pursuit
Gold	Jason Kenny	2016 Rio de Janeiro	Track cycling	Men's sprint
Silver	Callum Skinner	2016 Rio de Janeiro	Track cycling	Men's sprint
Gold	Philip Hindes; Jason Kenny; Callum Skinner	2016 Rio de Janeiro	Track cycling	Men's team sprint
Silver	Becky James	2016 Rio de Janeiro	Track cycling	Women's keirin
Gold	Laura Trott	2016 Rio de Janeiro	Track cycling	Women's omnium
Gold	Katie Archibald; Laura Trott; Elinor Barker; Joanna Rowsell Shand	2016 Rio de Janeiro	Track cycling	Women's team pursuit
Silver	Becky James	2016 Rio de Janeiro	Track cycling	Women's sprint
Bronze	Katy Marchant	2016 Rio de Janeiro	Track cycling	Women's sprint
Gold	Jason Kenny	2020 Tokyo	Track cycling	Men's keirin
Silver	Ethan Hayter; Matt Walls	2020 Tokyo	Track cycling	Men's madison
Gold	Matt Walls	2020 Tokyo	Track cycling	Men's omnium
Bronze	Jack Carlin	2020 Tokyo	Track cycling	Men's sprint
Silver	Jack Carlin; Jason Kenny; Ryan Owens	2020 Tokyo	Track cycling	Men's team sprint
Gold	Katie Archibald; Laura Kenny	2020 Tokyo	Track cycling	Women's madison
Silver	Katie Archibald; Laura Kenny; Neah Evans; Josie Knight; Elinor Barker	2020 Tokyo	Track cycling	Women's team pursuit
Gold	Tom Pidcock	2020 Tokyo	Mountain biking	Men's cross country
Silver	Kye Whyte	2020 Tokyo	BMX	Men's BMX racing
Bronze	Declan Brooks	2020 Tokyo	BMX	Men's BMX freestyle
Gold	Beth Shriever	2020 Tokyo	BMX	Women's BMX racing
Gold	Charlotte Worthington	2020 Tokyo	BMX	Women's BMX freestyle
Silver	Anna Henderson	2024 Paris	Road cycling	Women's time trial
Bronze	Jack Carlin	2024 Paris	Track cycling	Men's sprint
Silver	Ed Lowe; Hamish Turnbull; Jack Carlin	2024 Paris	Track cycling	Men's team sprint
Silver	Daniel Bigham; Ethan Hayter; Charlie Tanfield; Ethan Vernon; Oliver Wood	2024 Paris	Track cycling	Men's team pursuit
Bronze	Emma Finucane	2024 Paris	Track cycling	Women's sprint
Gold	Katy Marchant; Sophie Capewell; Emma Finucane	2024 Paris	Track cycling	Women's team sprint
Bronze	Emma Finucane	2024 Paris	Track cycling	Women's keirin
Silver	Elinor Barker; Neah Evans	2024 Paris	Track cycling	Women's madison
Bronze	Elinor Barker; Josie Knight; Anna Morris; Jessica Roberts	2024 Paris	Track cycling	Women's team pursuit
Gold	Tom Pidcock	2024 Paris	Mountain biking	Men's cross country
Silver	Kieran Reilly	2024 Paris	BMX	Men's BMX freestyle

=== Diving ===
Great Britain made its Olympic diving debut in 1908. Tom Daley, with one gold, one silver and three bronze medals, is the most decorated and most successful British Olympic diver in history, followed by Jack Laugher with one gold, one silver and two bronze medals

Year	Divers	Events	Gold	Silver	Bronze	Total	Rank
1904	Did not compete						
1908	16	2	0	0	0	0	—
1912	3	4	0	0	1	1	3
1920	5	5	0	1	0	1	4
1924	11	5	0	0	1	1	4
1928	7	4	0	0	0	0	–
1932	Did not compete						
1936	6	4	0	0	0	0	–
1948		4	0	0	0	0	–
1952	6	4	0	0	0	0	–
1956	5	4	0	0	0	0	–
1960		4	0	0	2	2	3
1964	6	4	0	0	0	0	–
1968	5	4	0	0	0	0	–
1972	8	4	0	0	0	0	–
1976	4	4	0	0	0	0	–
1980	6	4	0	0	0	0	–
1984	6	4	0	0	0	0	–
1988	5	4	0	0	0	0	–
1992	4	4	0	0	0	0	–
1996	5	4	0	0	0	0	–
2000	8	8	0	0	0	0	–
2004	7	8	0	1	0	1	6
2008	10	8	0	0	0	0	–
2012	12	8	0	0	1	1	7
2016	11	8	1	1	1	3	2
2020	12	8	1	0	2	3	2
2024	11	8	0	1	4	5	2
2028							
Total			2	4	12	18	10

==== Medallists ====
Medal	Name	Games	Sport	Event
Bronze	Isabelle White	1912 Stockholm	Diving	Women's 10 metre platform
Silver	Beatrice Armstrong	1920 Antwerp	Diving	Women's 10 metre platform
Bronze	Harold Clarke	1924 Paris	Diving	Men's plain high diving
Bronze	Brian Phelps	1960 Rome	Diving	Men's 10 metre platform
Bronze	Elizabeth Ferris	1960 Rome	Diving	Women's 10 metre platform
Silver	Peter Waterfield; Leon Taylor	2004 Athens	Diving	Men's synchronized 10 metre platform
Bronze	Tom Daley	2012 London	Diving	Men's 10 metre platform
Silver	Jack Laugher	2016 Rio de Janeiro	Diving	Men's 3 metre springboard
Gold	Jack Laugher; Chris Mears	2016 Rio de Janeiro	Diving	Men's synchronized 3 metre springboard
Bronze	Tom Daley; Daniel Goodfellow	2016 Rio de Janeiro	Diving	Men's synchronized 10 metre platform
Bronze	Jack Laugher	2020 Tokyo	Diving	Men's 3 metre springboard
Bronze	Tom Daley	2020 Tokyo	Diving	Men's 10 metre platform
Gold	Tom Daley; Matty Lee	2020 Tokyo	Diving	Men's synchronized 10 metre platform
Bronze	Noah Williams	2024 Paris	Diving	Men's 10 metre platform
Bronze	Anthony Harding; Jack Laugher	2024 Paris	Diving	Men's synchronized 3 metre springboard
Silver	Tom Daley; Noah Williams	2024 Paris	Diving	Men's synchronized 10 metre platform
Bronze	Yasmin Harper; Scarlett Mew Jensen	2024 Paris	Diving	Women's synchronized 3 metre springboard
Bronze	Andrea Spendolini-Sirieix; Lois Toulson	2024 Paris	Diving	Women's synchronized 10 metre platform

=== Equestrian ===
Great Britain had one rider compete in the hacks and hunter combined event at the first Olympic equestrian events in 1900.

Year	Riders	Events	Gold	Silver	Bronze	Total	Rank
1900	1	1	0	0	0	0	–
1912	4	5	0	0	0	0	–
1920		8	0	0	0	0	–
1924	6	6	0	0	0	0	–
1928		6	0	0	0	0	–
1932		6	0	0	0	0	–
1936	6	6	0	0	1	1	7
1948	6	6	0	0	1	1	7
1952	6	6	1	0	0	1	3
1956	8	6	1	0	2	3	3
1960	10	5	0	0	1	1	7
1964	8	6	0	0	1	1	8
1968	10	6	1	2	1	4	1
1972	11	6	2	1	0	3	2
1976	11	6	0	0	0	0	–
1980	Did not compete						
1984	11	6	0	2	1	3	4
1988	12	6	0	2	1	3	4
1992	12	6	0	0	0	0	–
1996	15	6	0	0	0	0	–
2000	14	6	0	1	0	1	5
2004	11	6	1	1	1	3	3
2008	12	6	0	0	2	2	7
2012	13	6	3	1	1	5	1
2016	12	6	2	1	0	3	2
2020	9	6	2	1	2	5	2
2024	9	6	2	0	3	5	2
2028							
Total			15	12	18	45	4

==== Medallists ====
Medal	Name	Games	Sport	Event
Bronze	Alec Scott on Bob Clive; Edward Howard-Vyse on Blue Steel; Richard Fanshawe on Bowie Knife	1936 Berlin	Equestrian	Team Eventing
Bronze	Harry Llewellyn and Foxhunter; Henry Nicoll and Kilgeddin; Arthur Carr and Monty	1948 London	Equestrian	Team Jumping
Gold	Wilfred White and Nizefela; Douglas Stewart and Aherlow; Harry Llewellyn and Foxhunter	1952 Helsinki	Equestrian	Team Jumping
Bronze	Francis Weldon and Kilbarry	(Australia) (Sweden) 1956 Melbourne|Stockholm	Equestrian	Individual Eventing
Gold	Francis Weldon and Kilbarry; Arthur Rook and Wild Venture; Bertie Hill and Countryman III	(Australia) (Sweden) 1956 Melbourne|Stockholm	Equestrian	Team Eventing
Bronze	Francis Weldon and Kilbarry; Arthur Rook and Wild Venture; Bertie Hill and Countryman III	(Australia) (Sweden) 1956 Melbourne|Stockholm	Equestrian	Team Jumping
Bronze	David Broome and Sunsalve	1960 Rome	Equestrian	Individual Jumping
Bronze	Peter Robeson and Firecrest	1964 Tokyo	Equestrian	Individual Jumping
Silver	Derek Allhusen and Lochinvar	1968 Mexico City	Equestrian	Individual Eventing
Gold	Derek Allhusen and Lochinvar; Richard Meade and Cornishman V Reuben Jones and The Poacher	1968 Mexico City	Equestrian	Team Eventing
Silver	Marion Coakes and Stroller	1968 Mexico City	Equestrian	Individual Jumping
Bronze	David Broome and Mr. Softee	1968 Mexico City	Equestrian	Individual Jumping
Gold	Richard Meade on Laurieston	1972 Munich	Equestrian	Individual Eventing
Gold	Richard Meade and Laurieston; Mary Gordon-Watson and Cornishman V Bridget Parker and Cornish Gold; Mark Phillips and Great Ovation	1972 Munich	Equestrian	Team Eventing
Silver	Ann Moore on Psalm	1972 Munich	Equestrian	Individual Jumping
Bronze	Virginia Leng and Priceless	1984 Los Angeles	Equestrian	Individual Eventing
Silver	Virginia Leng and Priceless; Ian Stark and Oxford Blue; Diana Clapham and Windjammer; Lucinda Green and Regal Realm	1984 Los Angeles	Equestrian	Team Eventing
Silver	Michael Whitaker and Overton Amanda; John Whitaker and Ryan's Son; Steven Smith and Shining Example; Timothy Grubb and Linky	1984 Los Angeles	Equestrian	Team Jumping
Silver	Ian Stark and Sir Wattie	1988 Seoul	Equestrian	Individual Eventing
Bronze	Virginia Leng and Master Craftsman	1988 Seoul	Equestrian	Individual Eventing
Silver	Captain Mark Phillips and Cartier; Karen Straker and Get Smart; Virginia Leng and Master Craftsman; Ian Stark and Sir Wattie	1988 Seoul	Equestrian	Team Eventing
Silver	Ian Stark and Jaybee; Jeanette Brakewell and Over To You; Pippa Funnell and Supreme Rock; Leslie Law and Shear H2O	2000 Sydney	Equestrian	Team Eventing
Gold	Leslie Law on Shear L'Eau	2004 Athens	Equestrian	Individual Eventing
Bronze	Pippa Funnell on Primmore's Pride	2004 Athens	Equestrian	Individual Eventing
Silver	Jeanette Brakewell on Over To You; Mary King on King Solomon III; Leslie Law on Shear L'Eau; Pippa Funnell on Primmore's Pride; William Fox-Pitt on Tamarillo	2004 Athens	Equestrian	Team Eventing
Bronze	Kristina Cook on Miners Frolic	2008 Beijing	Equestrian	Individual Eventing
Bronze	Sharon Hunt on Tankers Town; Daisy Dick on Spring Along; William Fox-Pitt on Parkmore Ed; Kristina Cook on Miners Frolic; Mary King on Call Again Cavalier	2008 Beijing	Equestrian	Team Eventing
Gold	Charlotte Dujardin on Valegro	2012 London	Equestrian	Individual Dressage
Bronze	Laura Bechtolsheimer on Mistral Hojris	2012 London	Equestrian	Individual Dressage
Gold	Carl Hester on Uthopia; Laura Bechtolsheimer on Mistral Hojris; Charlotte Dujardin on Valegro	2012 London	Equestrian	Team Dressage
Silver	Nicola Wilson on Opposition Buzz; Mary King on Imperial Cavalier; Zara Phillips on High Kingdom; Kristina Cook on Miners Frolic; William Fox-Pitt on Lionheart	2012 London	Equestrian	Team Eventing
Gold	Scott Brash on Hello Sanctos; Peter Charles on Vindicat; Ben Maher on Tripple X Nick Skelton on Big Star	2012 London	Equestrian	Team Jumping
Gold	Charlotte Dujardin on Valegro	2016 Rio de Janeiro	Equestrian	Individual Dressage
Silver	Spencer Wilton on Super Nova II; Fiona Bigwood on Orthilia; Carl Hester on Nip Tuck; Charlotte Dujardin on Valegro	2016 Rio de Janeiro	Equestrian	Team Dressage
Gold	Nick Skelton on Big Star	2016 Rio de Janeiro	Equestrian	Individual Jumping
Bronze	Charlotte Dujardin on Gio	2020 Tokyo	Equestrian	Individual Dressage
Bronze	Charlotte Fry on Everdale; Carl Hester on En Vogue; Charlotte Dujardin on Gio	2020 Tokyo	Equestrian	Team Dressage
Silver	Tom McEwen on Toledo de Kerser	2020 Tokyo	Equestrian	Individual Eventing
Gold	Laura Collett on London 52; Tom McEwen on Toledo de Kerser; Oliver Townend on Ballaghmore Class	2020 Tokyo	Equestrian	Team Eventing
Gold	Ben Maher on Explosion W	2020 Tokyo	Equestrian	Individual Jumping
Bronze	Charlotte Fry on Glamourdale	2024 Paris	Equestrian	Individual Dressage
Bronze	Becky Moody on Jagerbomb; Carl Hester on Fame; Charlotte Fry on Glamourdale	2024 Paris	Equestrian	Team Dressage
Bronze	Laura Collett on London 52	2024 Paris	Equestrian	Individual Eventing
Gold	Rosalind Canter on Lordships Graffalo; Tom McEwan on JD Dublin; Laura Collett on London 52	2024 Paris	Equestrian	Team Eventing
Gold	Ben Maher on Dallas Vegas Batilly; Harry Charles on Romeo 88; Scott Brash on Jefferson	2024 Paris	Equestrian	Team Jumping

=== Fencing ===
Great Britain first competed in fencing in 1900 and won its first fencing medal, a silver, in 1908 at the London Games.

Year	Fencers	Events	Gold	Silver	Bronze	Total	Rank
1896	Did not compete						
1900	3	7	0	0	0	0	—
1904	Did not compete						
1908	23	4	0	1	0	1	3
1912	22	5	0	1	0	1	5
1920	18	6	0	0	0	0	–
1924	20	7	0	1	0	1	6
1928	19	7	0	1	0	1	5
1932	3	7	0	1	0	1	6
1936	18	7	0	0	0	0	–
1948	19	7	0	0	0	0	–
1952	17	7	0	0	0	0	–
1956	9	7	1	0	0	1	4
1960	18	8	0	2	0	2	5
1964	13	8	0	1	0	1	7
1968	17	8	0	0	0	0	–
1972	19	8	0	0	0	0	–
1976	21	8	0	0	0	0	–
1980	11	8	0	0	0	0	–
1984	20	8	0	0	0	0	–
1988	13	8	0	0	0	0	–
1992	15	8	0	0	0	0	–
1996	2	10	0	0	0	0	–
2000	3	10	0	0	0	0	–
2004	2	10	0	0	0	0	–
2008	3	10	0	0	0	0	–
2012	12	10	0	0	0	0	–
2016	3	10	0	0	0	0	–
2020	1	12	0	0	0	0	–
2024	Did not compete						
2028							
Total			1	8	0	9	18

==== Medallists ====
Medal	Name	Games	Sport	Event
Silver	Charles Leaf Daniell; Cecil Haig; Martin Holt; Robert Montgomerie	1908 London	Fencing	Men's team épée
Silver	Edgar Amphlett; John Blake; Percival Davson; Arthur Everitt; Martin Holt; Sydney Mertineau; Robert Montgomerie; Edgar Seligman	1912 Stockholm	Fencing	Men's team épée
Silver	Gladys Davis	1924 Paris	Fencing	Women's foil
Silver	Muriel Freeman	1928 Amsterdam	Fencing	Women's foil
Silver	Judy Guinness	1932 Los Angeles	Fencing	Women's foil
Gold	Gillian Sheen	1956 Melbourne	Fencing	Women's foil
Silver	Allan Jay	1960 Rome	Fencing	Men's épée
Silver	Allan Jay; Michael Howard; John Pelling; Henry Hoskyns; Raymond Harrison; Michael Alexander	1960 Rome	Fencing	Men's team épée
Silver	Henry Hoskyns	1964 Tokyo	Fencing	Men's épée

=== Figure skating ===
Great Britain hosted the first Olympic figure skating contests in 1908. Figure skating, as of the 2026 Winter Olympics, is Great Britain's most successful winter sport, although seven of its medals were won in early editions of Summer Olympic Games.

Year	Skaters	Events	Gold	Silver	Bronze	Total	Rank
1908	11	4	1	2	3	6	1
1920	6	3	0	0	1	1	4
1924	6	3	0	0	1	1	5
1928	6	3	0	0	0	0	–
1932	4	3	0	0	0	0	–
1936	12	3	0	1	0	1	4
1948	9	3	0	0	1	1	7
1952	8	3	1	0	0	1	2
1956	8	3	0	0	0	0	–
1960	4	3	0	0	0	0	–
1964	5	3	0	0	0	0	–
1968	7	3	0	0	0	0	–
1972	5	3	0	0	0	0	–
1976	12	4	1	0	0	1	3
1980	9	4	1	0	0	1	3
1984	10	4	1	0	0	1	3
1988	9	4	0	0	0	0	–
1992	7	4	0	0	0	0	–
1994	6	4	0	0	1	1	5
1998	1	4	0	0	0	0	–
2002	2	4	0	0	0	0	–
2006	2	4	0	0	0	0	–
2010	7	4	0	0	0	0	–
2014	6	5	0	0	0	0	–
2018	2	5	0	0	0	0	–
2022	3	5	0	0	0	0	–
2026	8	5	0	0	0	0	–
Total			5	3	7	15	7

=== Football ===
Great Britain and Ireland – now represented separately by Team Ireland and Team Great Britain – was one of three teams to play in the inaugural football tournament, winning their only match to take the first Olympic gold medal in football. The men's team competed in the ten Olympics in the table below. The women's team competed in 2012 and 2020.

In 1974, the FA abolished the distinction between "amateur" and "professional" footballers in England. This ended the practice of "shamateurism", where players claimed to be amateur but still got irregular payments from their clubs. Also, Great Britain is not a member of FIFA and its athletes participate in international football competitions as members of the national teams of the home nations (England, Scotland, Wales and Northern Ireland), none of which have National Olympic Committees. As a result, Great Britain usually does not participate in Olympic qualifying tournaments.

Having qualified as hosts in both tournaments in 2012, pressure arose to find a way for Great Britain, and at least a women's team, to take part in Olympic football competitions. The solution, first instituted in time for the 2020 Games, and following the precedent set out by field hockey and rugby sevens, was for the results of the England women's team, as the highest ranked national team within Great Britain, to be treated as qualification results for the purposes of UEFA quota places. When both England and Scotland qualified for the FIFA Women's World Cup, the UEFA designated qualification tournament, England's results were treated as Great Britain results for Olympic qualification purposes, while Scottish results were ignored for the same purposes. England's U23 men's team do not have a similar arrangement. Notwithstanding the arrangement, in the event of qualification, Scottish and Welsh players are eligible.

Year	Footballers	Events	Gold	Silver	Bronze	Total	Rank
1896	No competition						
1900	11	1	1	0	0	1	1
1904	Did not compete						
1908	11	1	1	0	0	1	1
1912	11	1	1	0	0	1	1
1920	11	1	0	0	0	0	–
1924	Did not compete						
1928	Did not compete						
1932	No Competition						
1936	11	1	0	0	0	0	–
1948	11	1	0	0	0	0	–
1952	11	1	0	0	0	0	–
1956	11	1	0	0	0	0	–
1960	11	1	0	0	0	0	–
1964–2008	Did not compete						
2012	22	2	0	0	0	0	–
2016	Did not compete						
2020	18	2	0	0	0	0	–
2024	Did not compete						
2028							
Total			3	0	0	3	3

==== Medallists ====
Medal	Name	Games	Sport	Event
Gold	James Jones; Claude Buckenham; William Gosling; Alfred Chalk; Tom Burridge; William Quash; Richard Turner; Fred Spackman; John Nicholas; Jack Zealley; Henry Haslam	1900 Paris	Football	Men's tournament
Gold	Horace Bailey; Arthur Berry; Frederick Chapman; Walter Corbett; Harold Hardman; Robert Hawkes; Kenneth Hunt; Herbert Smith; Harold Stapley; Clyde Purnell; Vivian Woodward George Barlow; Albert Bell; Ronald Brebner; W. Crabtree; Walter Daffern; Thomas Porter; Albert Scothern	1908 London	Football	Men's tournament
Gold	Arthur Berry; Ronald Brebner; Thomas Burn; Joseph Dines; Edward Hanney; Gordon Hoare; Arthur Knight; Henry Littlewort; Douglas McWhirter; Ivan Sharpe; Harold Stamper; Harold Walden; Vivian Woodward; Gordon Wright	1912 Stockholm	Football	Men's tournament

=== Freestyle skiing ===
Year	Skiers	Events	Gold	Silver	Bronze	Total	Rank
1988 (demonstration)	Did not compete						
1992	5	6	0	0	0	0	–
1994	3	4	0	0	0	0	–
1998	3	4	0	0	0	0	–
2002	3	4	0	0	0	0	–
2006	Did not compete						
2010	3	6	0	0	0	0	–
2014	6	10	0	0	0	0	–
2018	11	10	0	0	1	1	11
2022	11	13	0	0	0	0	–
2026	8	15	0	0	1	1	11
Total			0	0	2	2	22

=== Golf ===
Great Britain was one of four teams to play golf at the first Olympic golf events in 1900, taking silver and bronze in the men's competition. They did not compete in the Olympic golf competition held in 1904. When the sport returned in the 2016 Rio Olympics, after a 112-year absence, Justin Rose won gold.

Year	Golfers	Events	Gold	Silver	Bronze	Total	Rank
1900	4	2	0	1	1	2	2
1904	Did not compete						
1908–2012	No competition						
2016	4	2	1	0	0	1	1
2020	4	2	0	0	0	0	–
2024	4	2	0	1	0	1	3
2028							
Total			1	2	1	4	2

==== Medallists ====
Medal	Name	Games	Sport	Event
Silver	Walter Rutherford	1900 Paris	Golf	Men's individual
Bronze	David Robertson	1900 Paris	Golf	Men's individual
Gold	Justin Rose	2016 Rio de Janeiro	Golf	Men's individual
Silver	Tommy Fleetwood	2024 Paris	Golf	Men's individual

=== Gymnastics ===
Great Britain first competed in gymnastics in the inaugural 1896 Olympics, with wrestler Launceston Elliot entering the rope climbing event and finishing last. Great Britain's first gymnastics medal came in 1908 with a silver in the men's individual all-around. Until 2008, Great Britain's last medal for gymnastics was a Bronze in the Women's all-round team event in 1928. At the 2012 Summer Games in London, Great Britain equaled its tally for all previous games combined, winning 4 medals to bring their all-time total to eight. A record seven medals, including first ever gold medals, were won in 2016, while a further three, including one gold, were won at the 2020 Games. Having won only four medals in total between 1896 and 2008, 14 medals, including 3 gold medals were secured between 2012 and 2020.

Year	Gymnasts	Events	Gold	Silver	Bronze	Total	Rank
1896	1	8	0	0	0	0	–
1900	5	1	0	0	0	0	–
1904	Did not compete						
1908	65	2	0	1	0	1	3
1912	23	4	0	0	1	1	8
1920	27	4	0	0	0	0	–
1924	8	9	0	0	0	0	–
1928	20	8	0	0	1	1	6
1932	Did not compete						
1936	8	9	0	0	0	0	–
1948	16	9	0	0	0	0	–
1952	14	15	0	0	0	0	–
1956	3	15	0	0	0	0	–
1960	12	14	0	0	0	0	–
1964	4	14	0	0	0	0	–
1968	4	14	0	0	0	0	–
1972	9	14	0	0	0	0	–
1976	12	14	0	0	0	0	–
1980	6	14	0	0	0	0	–
1984	12	14	0	0	0	0	–
1988	4	15	0	0	0	0	–
1992	8	15	0	0	0	0	–
1996	4	16	0	0	0	0	–
2000	7	18	0	0	0	0	–
2004	6	18	0	0	0	0	–
2008	8	18	0	0	1	1	17
2012	10	18	0	1	3	4	12
2016	10	18	2	2	3	7	3
2020	10	18	1	0	2	3	7
2024	13	18	1	0	2	3	7
2028							
Total			4	4	13	21	19

==== Medallists ====
Medal	Name	Games	Sport	Event
Silver	Walter Tysall	1908 London	Gymnastics	Men's all-around, individual
Bronze	Albert Betts; William Cowhig; Sidney Cross; Harold Dickason; Herbert Drury; Bernard Franklin; Leonard Hanson; Samuel Hodgetts; Charles Luck; William MacKune; Ronald McLean; Alfred Messenger; Henry Oberholzer; Edward Pepper; Edward Potts; Reginald Potts; George Ross; Charles Simmons; Arthur Southern; William Titt; Charles Vigurs; Samuel Walker; John Whitaker	1912 Stockholm	Gymnastics	Men's all-around, team
Bronze	Annie Broadbent; Lucy Desmond; Margaret Hartley; Amy Jagger; Isobel Judd; Jessie Kite; Marjorie Moreman; Edith Pickles; Ethel Seymour; Ada Smith; Hilda Smith; Doris Woods	1928 Amsterdam	Gymnastics	Women's all-around, team
Bronze	Louis Smith	2008 Beijing	Gymnastics	Men's pommel horse
Bronze	Sam Oldham; Daniel Purvis; Louis Smith; Kristian Thomas; Max Whitlock	2012 London	Gymnastics	Men's all-around, team
Silver	Louis Smith	2012 London	Gymnastics	Men's pommel horse
Bronze	Max Whitlock	2012 London	Gymnastics	Men's pommel horse
Bronze	Beth Tweddle	2012 London	Gymnastics	Women's uneven bars
Bronze	Max Whitlock	2016 Rio de Janeiro	Gymnastics	Men's all-around, individual
Gold	Max Whitlock	2016 Rio de Janeiro	Gymnastics	Men's floor exercise
Gold	Max Whitlock	2016 Rio de Janeiro	Gymnastics	Men's pommel horse
Silver	Louis Smith	2016 Rio de Janeiro	Gymnastics	Men's pommel horse
Bronze	Nile Wilson	2016 Rio de Janeiro	Gymnastics	Men's horizontal bar
Bronze	Amy Tinkler	2016 Rio de Janeiro	Gymnastics	Women's floor exercise
Silver	Bryony Page	2016 Rio de Janeiro	Gymnastics	Women's trampoline
Gold	Max Whitlock	2020 Tokyo	Gymnastics	Men's pommel horse
Bronze	Jennifer Gadirova; Jessica Gadirova; Alice Kinsella; Amelie Morgan	2020 Tokyo	Gymnastics	Women's all-around, team
Bronze	Bryony Page	2020 Tokyo	Gymnastics	Women's trampoline
Bronze	Jake Jarman	2024 Paris	Gymnastics	Men's floor exercise
Bronze	Harry Hepworth	2024 Paris	Gymnastics	Men's vault
Gold	Bryony Page	2024 Paris	Gymnastics	Women's trampoline

=== Handball ===
Great Britain's men's and women's handball teams were allowed to take up host places at the 2012 Olympics. This is the only time that Great Britain has competed in handball at the Olympics.

Year	Players	Events	Gold	Silver	Bronze	Total	Rank
1936	Did not compete						
1948–1968	No competition						
1972–2008	Did not compete						
2012	30	2	0	0	0	0	–
2016–2024	Did not compete						
Total			0	0	0	0	–

=== Field hockey ===
Great Britain hosted the first Olympic field hockey tournament in 1908.

Year	Players	Events	Gold	Silver	Bronze	Total	Rank
1908	45	1	1	1	2	4	1
1912	No hockey tournament						
1920	15	1	1	0	0	1	1
1924	No hockey tournament						
1928	Did not compete						
1932		1	0	0	0	0	-
1936	Did not compete						
1948	12	1	0	1	0	1	2
1952	13	1	0	0	1	1	3
1956		1	0	0	0	0	–
1960		1	0	0	0	0	–
1964		1	0	0	0	0	–
1968		1	0	0	0	0	–
1972		1	0	0	0	0	–
1976	Did not compete						
1980	Did not compete						
1984		2	0	0	1	1	4
1988		2	1	0	0	1	1
1992		2	0	0	1	1	4
1996		2	0	0	0	0	–
2000		2	0	0	0	0	–
2004		2	0	0	0	0	–
2008		2	0	0	0	0	–
2012		2	0	0	1	1	5
2016		2	1	0	0	1	1
2020	32	2	0	0	1	1	5
2024	32	2	0	0	0	0	–
2028							
Total			4	2	7	13	5

==== Medallists ====
Medal	Name	Games	Sport	Event
Gold	England; Louis Baillon; Harry Freeman; Eric Green; Gerald Logan; Alan Noble; Edgar Page; Reggie Pridmore; Percy Rees; John Yate Robinson; Stanley Shoveller; Harvey Wood	1908 London	Field hockey	Men's tournament
Silver	Ireland; Edward Allman-Smith; Henry Brown; Walter Campbell; William Graham; Richard Gregg; Edward Holmes; Robert Kennedy; Henry Murphy; Jack Peterson; Walter Peterson; Charles Power; Frank Robinson	1908 London	Field hockey	Men's tournament
Bronze	Scotland; Alexander Burt; John Burt; Alastair Denniston; Charles Foulkes; Hew Fraser; James Harper-Orr; Ivan Laing; Hugh Neilson; Gordon Orchardson; Norman Stevenson; Hugh Walker	1908 London	Field hockey	Men's tournament
Bronze	Wales; Frank Connah; Llewellyn Evans; Arthur Law; Richard Lyne; Wilfred Pallott; Frederick Phillips; Edward Richards; Charles Shephard; Bertrand Turnbull; Philip Turnbull; James Williams	1908 London	Field hockey	Men's tournament
Gold	Charles Atkin; John Bennett; Colin Campbell; Harold Cassels; Harold Cooke; Eric Crockford; Reginald Crummack; Harry Haslam; Arthur Leighton; Charles Marcon; John McBryan; George McGrath; Stanley Shoveller; William Smith; Cyril Wilkinson	1920 Antwerp	Field hockey	Men's tournament
Silver	Robert Adlard; Norman Borrett; David Brodie; Ronald Davis; William Griffiths; Frederick Lindsay; William Lindsay; John Peake; Frank Reynolds; George Sime; Michael Walford; William White	1948 London	Field hockey	Men's tournament
Bronze	Denys Carnill; John Cockett; John Conroy; Graham Dadds; Derek Day; Dennis Eagan; Robin Fletcher; Roger Midgley; Richard Norris; Neil Nugent; Anthony Nunn; Anthony John Robinson; John Paskin Taylor	1952 Helsinki	Field hockey	Men's tournament
Bronze	Paul Barber; Stephen Batchelor; Kulbir Bhaura; Robert Cattrall; Richard Dodds; James Duthie; Norman Hughes; Sean Kerly; Richard Leman; Stephen Martin; Billy McConnell; Veryan Pappin; Jon Potter; Mark Precious; Ian Taylor; David Westcott	1984 Los Angeles	Field hockey	Men's tournament
Gold	Paul Barber; Stephen Batchelor; Kulbir Bhaura; Robert Clift; Richard Dodds; David Faulkner; Russell Garcia; Martyn Grimley; Sean Kerly; Jimmy Kirkwood; Richard Leman; Stephen Martin; Veryan Pappin; Jon Potter; Imran Sherwani; Ian Taylor	1988 Seoul	Field hockey	Men's tournament
Bronze	Jill Atkins; Lisa Bayliss; Karen Brown; Vickey Dixon; Susan Fraser; Wendy Fraser; Kathryn Johnson; Sandy Lister; Jackie McWilliams; Tammy Miller; Helen Morgan; Mary Nevill; Mandy Nicholls; Alison Ramsay; Jane Sixsmith; Joanne Thompson	1992 Barcelona	Field hockey	Women's tournament
Bronze	Beth Storry; Emily Maguire; Laura Unsworth; Crista Cullen; Anne Panter; Hannah Macleod; Helen Richardson; Kate Walsh; Chloe Rogers; Laura Bartlett; Alex Danson; Georgie Twigg; Ashleigh Ball; Sally Walton; Nicola White; Sarah Thomas	2012 London	Field hockey	Women's tournament
Gold	Maddie Hinch; Laura Unsworth; Crista Cullen; Hannah Macleod; Georgie Twigg; Helen Richardson-Walsh; Susannah Townsend; Kate Richardson-Walsh; Sam Quek; Alex Danson; Giselle Ansley; Sophie Bray; Hollie Webb; Shona McCallin; Lily Owsley; Nicola White	2016 Rio de Janeiro	Field hockey	Women's tournament
Bronze	Giselle Ansley; Grace Balsdon; Fiona Crackles; Maddie Hinch; Sarah Jones; Hannah Martin; Shona McCallin; Lily Owsley; Hollie Pearne-Webb; Isabelle Petter; Ellie Rayer; Sarah Robertson; Anna Toman; Susannah Townsend; Laura Unsworth; Leah Wilkinson	2020 Tokyo	Field hockey	Women's tournament

=== Ice hockey ===
Year	Players	Events	Gold	Silver	Bronze	Total	Rank
1920	Did not compete						
1924	10	1	0	0	1	1	3
1928	12	1	0	0	0	0	–
1932	Did not compete						
1936	13	1	1	0	0	1	1
1948	14	1	0	0	0	0	–
1952–2026	Did not compete						
Total			1	0	1	2	5

=== Jeu de paume ===
Great Britain hosted the only Olympic jeu de paume tournament in 1908.

Year	Players	Events	Gold	Silver	Bronze	Total	Rank
1908	9	1	0	1	1	2	2

=== Judo ===
Great Britain has competed in all judo events held at the Summer Olympics since judo made its full debut as an Olympic sport in 1964. Although Great Britain has won 20 judo medals, none have been gold.

Year	Judokas	Events	Gold	Silver	Bronze	Total	Rank
1964	4	4	0	0	0	0	–
1968	No Judo tournament						
1972	5	6	0	1	2	3	4
1976	3	6	0	1	1	2	5
1980	8	8	0	1	1	2	8
1984	8	8	0	1	2	3	5
1988	3	7	0	0	1	1	11
1992	14	14	0	2	2	4	11
1996	13	14	0	0	0	0	–
2000	9	14	0	1	0	1	12
2004	8	14	0	0	0	0	–
2008	7	14	0	0	0	0	–
2012	14	14	0	1	1	2	13
2016	7	14	0	0	1	1	21
2020	6	15	0	0	1	1	17
2024	5	15	0	0	0	0	–
Total			0	8	12	20	34

==== Medallists ====
Medal	Name	Games	Sport	Event
Bronze	Brian Jacks	1972 Munich	Judo	Men's 80 kg
Silver	David Starbrook	1972 Munich	Judo	Men's 93 kg
Bronze	Angelo Parisi	1972 Munich	Judo	Men's open category
Bronze	David Starbrook	1976 Montreal	Judo	Men's 93 kg
Silver	Keith Remfry	1976 Montreal	Judo	Men's open category
Silver	Neil Adams	1980 Moscow	Judo	Men's 71 kg
Bronze	Arthur Mapp	1980 Moscow	Judo	Men's open category
Bronze	Neil Eckersley	1984 Los Angeles	Judo	Men's 60 kg
Bronze	Kerrith Brown	1984 Los Angeles	Judo	Men's 71 kg
Silver	Neil Adams	1984 Los Angeles	Judo	Men's 78 kg
Bronze	Dennis Stewart	1988 Seoul	Judo	Men's 95 kg
Silver	Raymond Stevens	1992 Barcelona	Judo	Men's 95 kg
Bronze	Sharon Rendle	1992 Barcelona	Judo	Women's 52 kg
Silver	Nicola Fairbrother	1992 Barcelona	Judo	Women's 56 kg
Bronze	Kate Howey	1992 Barcelona	Judo	Women's 66 kg
Silver	Kate Howey	2000 Sydney	Judo	Women's 70 kg
Silver	Gemma Gibbons	2012 London	Judo	Women's 78 kg
Bronze	Karina Bryant	2012 London	Judo	Women's +78 kg
Bronze	Sally Conway	2016 Rio de Janeiro	Judo	Women's 70 kg
Bronze	Chelsie Giles	2020 Tokyo	Judo	Women's 52 kg

=== Lacrosse ===
Great Britain's Olympic lacrosse debut was in 1908.

Year	Players	Events	Gold	Silver	Bronze	Total	Rank
1908	12	1	0	1	0	1	2

=== Luge ===
Year	Lugers	Events	Gold	Silver	Bronze	Total	Rank
1964	2	3	0	0	0	0	–
1968	2	3	0	0	0	0	–
1972	6	3	0	0	0	0	–
1976	4	3	0	0	0	0	–
1980	7	3	0	0	0	0	–
1984	4	3	0	0	0	0	–
1988	4	3	0	0	0	0	–
1992	2	3	0	0	0	0	–
1994	1	3	0	0	0	0	–
1998	Did not compete						
2002	1	3	0	0	0	0	–
2006	2	3	0	0	0	0	–
2010	1	3	0	0	0	0	–
2014	Did not compete						
2018	2	4	0	0	0	0	–
2022	1	4	0	0	0	0	–
2026	Did not compete						
Total			0	0	0	0	–

=== Marathon swimming ===
All swimming races in 1896, 1900 and 1904 took place in open water before they moved to pools at London 1908, but it wasn't until Beijing 2008 that marathon swimming officially became an Olympic discipline.

Year	Swimmers	Events	Gold	Silver	Bronze	Total	Rank
2008	3	2	0	2	1	3	3
2012	2	2	0	0	0	0	–
2016	2	2	0	0	0	0	–
2020	2	2	0	0	0	0	–
2024	3	2	0	0	0	0	–
Total			0	2	1	3	7

==== Medallists ====
Medal	Name	Games	Sport	Event
Silver	David Davies	2008 Beijing	Marathon swimming	Men's 10 kilometre
Silver	Keri-Anne Payne	2008 Beijing	Marathon swimming	Women's 10 kilometre
Bronze	Cassandra Patten	2008 Beijing	Marathon swimming	Women's 10 kilometre

=== Modern pentathlon ===
Great Britain's Olympic modern pentathlon debut was in 1912 when it was first included in the Olympics. Their most successful games were the 2020 Tokyo Olympics, where Great Britain won both the available gold medals.

Year	Pentathletes	Events	Gold	Silver	Bronze	Total	Rank
1912	3	1	0	0	0	0	–
1920	4	1	0	0	0	0	–
1924	4	1	0	0	0	0	–
1928	3	1	0	0	0	0	–
1932	3	1	0	0	0	0	–
1936	3	1	0	0	0	0	–
1948	3	1	0	0	0	0	–
1952	3	2	0	0	0	0	–
1956	3	2	0	0	0	0	–
1960	3	2	0	0	0	0	–
1964	3	2	0	0	0	0	–
1968	3	2	0	0	0	0	–
1972	3	2	0	0	0	0	–
1976	3	2	1	0	0	1	1
1980	3	2	0	0	0	0	–
1984	3	2	0	0	0	0	–
1988	3	2	0	0	1	1	3
1992	3	2	0	0	0	0	–
1996	1	1	0	0	0	0	–
2000	2	2	1	0	1	2	1
2004	2	2	0	0	1	1	5
2008	4	2	0	1	0	1	4
2012	4	2	0	1	0	1	3
2016	4	2	0	0	0	0	–
2020	4	2	2	0	0	2	1
2024	4	2	0	0	0	0	–
2028							
Total			4	2	3	9	4

==== Medallists ====
Medal	Name	Games	Sport	Event
Gold	Jim Fox; Danny Nightingale; Adrian Parker	1976 Montreal	Modern pentathlon	Men's team
Bronze	Richard Phelps; Dominic Mahony; Graham Brookhouse	1988 Seoul	Modern pentathlon	Men's team
Gold	Stephanie Cook	2000 Sydney	Modern pentathlon	Women's individual
Bronze	Kate Allenby	2000 Sydney	Modern pentathlon	Women's individual
Bronze	Georgina Harland	2004 Athens	Modern pentathlon	Women's individual
Silver	Heather Fell	2008 Beijing	Modern pentathlon	Women's individual
Silver	Samantha Murray	2012 London	Modern pentathlon	Women's individual
Gold	Joe Choong	2020 Tokyo	Modern pentathlon	Men's individual
Gold	Kate French	2020 Tokyo	Modern pentathlon	Women's individual

=== Nordic combined ===
Year	Skiers	Events	Gold	Silver	Bronze	Total	Rank
1924–1932	Did not compete						
1936	1	1	0	0	0	0	–
1948–2026	Did not compete						
Total			0	0	0	0	–

=== Polo ===
Great Britain was one of four teams to compete in the debut of Olympic polo. Three of the five teams had British players and took both the top two places and split the third place with the Mexico. Great Britain would be the only team to play in all five of the Olympic polo tournaments, with no other nation appearing more than three times. The nation took gold and two silvers in 1908, when only British teams competed. Facing international competition in 1920, the British side won. The 1924 tournament resulted in a bronze medal for Great Britain, while the team took silver in 1936. In international play, the Great Britain team had an overall record of 5–3 (semifinal and final wins in 1920, a 2–2 record the 1924 round-robin and a first-round win and final loss in 1936). There were 2 games in 1908 pitting teams from Great Britain against each other, necessarily resulting in a 2–2 record that year. The mixed teams in 1900 had records of 3–0, 1–1 and 0–1, though both losses (and, of course, therefore two of the wins) were against each other.

Year	Players	Events	Gold	Silver	Bronze	Total	Rank
1900	7	as part of the Mixed team					
1904	No competition						
1908	12	1	1	2	0	3	1
1912	No competition						
1920	4	1	1	0	0	1	1
1924	4	1	0	0	1	1	3
1928–1932	No competition						
1936	2	1	0	1	0	1	2
1948–Present	No competition						
Total			2	3	1	6	1

Event	No. of appearances	First appearance	First medal	First gold medal	Gold	Silver	Bronze	Total	Best finish
Men's	5/5	1900	1908	1908	2	3	1	6	(gold) (1908, 1920)

=== Rackets ===
Great Britain hosted the only Olympic rackets tournament, in 1908.

Year	Players	Events	Gold	Silver	Bronze	Total	Rank
1908	7	2	2	2	3	7	1

=== Rowing ===
Great Britain took a bronze medal in the first Olympic rowing competition, in 1900.

Games	No. Rowers	Events	Gold	Silver	Bronze	Total	Ranking
1896 Athens	Event wasn't held						
1900 Paris	1	1/5	0	0	1	1	7
1904 St Louis	0	0/5	0	0	0	0	
1908 London	32	(8)/5	4	3	1	8	1
1912 Stockholm	24	(4)/4	2	2	0	4	1
1916	Games Cancelled						
1920 Antwerp	10	2/5	0	2	0	2	4
1924 Paris	17	4/7	2	0	0	2	3
1928 Amsterdam	19	5/7	1	2	1	4	2
1932 Los Angeles	16	4/7	2	0	0	2	2
1936 Berlin	18	5/7	1	1	0	2	2
1940	Games Cancelled						
1944	Games Cancelled						
1948 London	26	7/7	2	1	0	3	1
1952 Helsinki	23	6/7	0	0	0	0	
1956 Melbourne	13	3/7	0	0	0	0	
1960 Rome	26	7/7	0	0	0	0	
1964 Tokyo	8	3/7	0	1	0	1	7=
1968 Mexico City	10	2/7	0	0	0	0	
1972 Munich	17	6/7	0	0	0	0	
1976 Montreal	32	8/14	0	2	0	2	7
1980 Moscow	43	11/14	0	1	2	3	6
1984 Los Angeles	42	10/14	1	0	0	1	6=
1988 Seoul	32	8/14	1	0	1	2	
1992 Barcelona	46	12/14	2	0	0	2	4=
1996 Atlanta	37	10/14	1	0	1	2	7=
2000 Sydney	36	10/14	2	1	0	3	3
2004 Athens	36	11/14	1	2	1	4	3
2008 Beijing	43	12/14	2	2	2	6	1
2012 London	47	13/14	4	2	3	9	1
2016 Rio	43	12/14	3	2	0	5	1
2020 Tokyo	43	11/14	0	1	1	2	14
2024 Paris	40	9/14	3	2	3	8	2
Total	780	264	34	27	17	78	2

==== Medallists ====
Medal	Name	Games	Sport	Event
Bronze	Saint-George Ashe	1900 Paris	Rowing	Men's single sculls
Gold	Harry Blackstaffe	1908 London	Rowing	Men's single sculls
Silver	Alexander McCulloch	1908 London	Rowing	Men's single sculls
Gold	John Fenning; Gordon Thomson	1908 London	Rowing	Men's coxless pair
Silver	George Fairbairn; Philip Verdon	1908 London	Rowing	Men's coxless pair
Gold	Collier Cudmore; James Angus Gillan; Duncan Mackinnon; John Somers-Smith	1908 London	Rowing	Men's coxless four
Silver	Philip Filleul; Harold Barker; John Fenning; Gordon Thomson	1908 London	Rowing	Men's coxless four
Gold	Albert Gladstone; Frederick Kelly; Banner Johnstone; Guy Nickalls; Charles Burnell; Ronald Sanderson; Raymond Etherington-Smith; Henry Bucknall; Gilchrist Maclagan	1908 London	Rowing	Men's eight
Bronze	Frank Jerwood; Eric Powell; Oswald Carver; Edward Williams; Henry Goldsmith; Harold Kitching; John Burn; Douglas Stuart; Richard Boyle	1908 London	Rowing	Men's eight
Gold	Wally Kinnear	1912 Stockholm	Rowing	Men's single sculls
Silver	Julius Beresford; Karl Vernon; Charles Rought; Bruce Logan; Geoffrey Carr	1912 Stockholm	Rowing	Men's coxed four
Gold	Edgar Burgess; Sidney Swann; Leslie Wormald; Ewart Horsfall; James Angus Gillan; Stanley Garton; Alister Kirby; Philip Fleming; Henry Wells	1912 Stockholm	Rowing	Men's eight
Silver	William Fison; William Parker; Thomas Gillespie; Beaufort Burdekin; Frederick Pitman; Arthur Wiggins; Charles Littlejohn; Robert Bourne; John Walker	1912 Stockholm	Rowing	Men's eight
Silver	Jack Beresford	1920 Antwerp	Rowing	Men's single sculls
Silver	Ewart Horsfall; Guy Oliver Nickalls; Richard Lucas; Walter James; John Campbell; Sebastian Earl; Ralph Shove; Sidney Swann; Robin Johnstone	1920 Antwerp	Rowing	Men's eight
Gold	Jack Beresford	1924 Paris	Rowing	Men's single sculls
Gold	Maxwell Eley; James MacNabb; Robert Morrison; Terence Sanders	1924 Paris	Rowing	Men's coxless four
Bronze	David Collet	1928 Amsterdam	Rowing	Men's single sculls
Silver	Terence O'Brien; Robert Nisbet	1928 Amsterdam	Rowing	Men's coxless pair
Gold	John Lander; Michael Warriner; Richard Beesly; Edward Vaughan Bevan	1928 Amsterdam	Rowing	Men's coxless four
Silver	Jamie Hamilton; Guy Oliver Nickalls; John Badcock; Donald Gollan; Harold Lane; Gordon Killick; Jack Beresford; Harold West; Arthur Sulley	1928 Amsterdam	Rowing	Men's eight
Gold	Lewis Clive; Hugh Edwards	1932 Los Angeles	Rowing	Men's coxless pair
Gold	John Badcock; Hugh Edwards; Jack Beresford; Rowland George	1932 Los Angeles	Rowing	Men's coxless four
Gold	Jack Beresford; Dick Southwood	1936 Berlin	Rowing	Men's double sculls
Silver	Martin Bristow; Alan Barrett; Peter Jackson; John Sturrock	1936 Berlin	Rowing	Men's coxless four
Gold	Richard Burnell; Bertie Bushnell	1948 London	Rowing	Men's double sculls
Gold	John Wilson; Ran Laurie	1948 London	Rowing	Men's coxless pair
Silver	Christopher Barton; Michael Lapage; Guy Richardson; Paul Bircher; Paul Massey; Brian Lloyd; John Meyrick; Alfred Mellows; Jack Dearlove	1948 London	Rowing	Men's eight
Silver	John Russell; Hugh Wardell-Yerburgh; William Barry; John James	1964 Tokyo	Rowing	Men's coxless four
Silver	Chris Baillieu; Michael Hart	1976 Montreal	Rowing	Men's double sculls
Silver	Richard Lester; John Yallop; Timothy Crooks; Hugh Matheson; David Maxwell; Jim Clark; Frederick Smallbone; Lenny Robertson; Patrick Sweeney	1976 Montreal	Rowing	Men's eight
Bronze	Charles Wiggin; Malcolm Carmichael	1980 Moscow	Rowing	Men's coxless pair
Bronze	John Beattie; Ian McNuff; David Townsend; Martin Cross	1980 Moscow	Rowing	Men's coxless four
Silver	Duncan McDougall; Allan Whitwell; Henry Clay; Chris Mahoney; Andrew Justice; John Pritchard; Malcolm McGowan; Richard Stanhope; Colin Moynihan	1980 Moscow	Rowing	Men's eight
Gold	Richard Budgett; Martin Cross; Adrian Ellison; Andy Holmes; Steve Redgrave	1984 Los Angeles	Rowing	Men's coxed four
Gold	Andy Holmes; Steve Redgrave	1988 Seoul	Rowing	Men's coxless pair
Bronze	Andy Holmes; Steve Redgrave; Patrick Sweeney	1988 Seoul	Rowing	Men's coxed pair
Gold	Matthew Pinsent; Steve Redgrave	1992 Barcelona	Rowing	Men's coxless pair
Gold	Garry Herbert; Greg Searle; Jonny Searle	1992 Barcelona	Rowing	Men's coxed pair
Gold	Matthew Pinsent; Steve Redgrave	1996 Atlanta	Rowing	Men's coxless pair
Bronze	Gregory Searle; Jonathan William Searle; Rupert John Obholzer; Tim Foster	1996 Atlanta	Rowing	Men's coxless four
Gold	James Cracknell; Steve Redgrave; Tim Foster; Matthew Pinsent	2000 Sydney	Rowing	Men's coxless four
Gold	Andrew Lindsay; Ben Hunt-Davis; Simon Dennis; Louis Attrill; Luka Grubor; Kieran West; Fred Scarlett; Steve Trapmore; Rowley Douglas	2000 Sydney	Rowing	Men's eight
Silver	Guin Batten; Miriam Batten; Katherine Grainger; Gillian Lindsay	2000 Sydney	Rowing	Women's quadruple sculls
Gold	Steve Williams; James Cracknell; Ed Coode; Matthew Pinsent	2004 Athens	Rowing	Men's coxless four
Bronze	Sarah Winckless; Elise Laverick	2004 Athens	Rowing	Women's double sculls
Silver	Alison Mowbray; Debbie Flood; Frances Houghton; Rebecca Romero	2004 Athens	Rowing	Women's quadruple sculls
Silver	Katherine Grainger; Cath Bishop	2004 Athens	Rowing	Women's coxless pair
Bronze	Matthew Wells; Stephen Rowbotham	2008 Beijing	Rowing	Men's double sculls
Gold	Tom James; Steve Williams; Pete Reed; Andrew Triggs Hodge	2008 Beijing	Rowing	Men's coxless four
Silver	Alex Partridge; Tom Stallard; Tom Lucy; Richard Egington; Josh West; Alastair Heathcote; Matt Langridge; Colin Smith; Acer Nethercott	2008 Beijing	Rowing	Men's eight
Gold	Zac Purchase; Mark Hunter	2008 Beijing	Rowing	Men's lightweight double sculls
Bronze	Elise Laverick; Anna Bebington	2008 Beijing	Rowing	Women's double sculls
Silver	Annabel Vernon; Debbie Flood; Frances Houghton; Katherine Grainger	2008 Beijing	Rowing	Women's quadruple sculls
Bronze	Alan Campbell	2012 London	Rowing	Men's single sculls
Bronze	George Nash; Will Satch	2012 London	Rowing	Men's coxless pair
Gold	Alex Gregory; Tom James; Pete Reed; Andrew Triggs Hodge	2012 London	Rowing	Men's coxless four
Bronze	Alex Partridge; James Emmott; Tom Ransley; Richard Egington; Moe Sbihi; Greg Searle; Matt Langridge; Constantine Louloudis; Phelan Hill	2012 London	Rowing	Men's eight
Silver	Zac Purchase; Mark Hunter	2012 London	Rowing	Men's lightweight double sculls
Silver	Peter Chambers; Rob Williams; Richard Chambers; Chris Bartley	2012 London	Rowing	Men's lightweight coxless four
Gold	Anna Watkins; Katherine Grainger	2012 London	Rowing	Women's double sculls
Gold	Helen Glover; Heather Stanning	2012 London	Rowing	Women's coxless pair
Gold	Katherine Copeland; Sophie Hosking	2012 London	Rowing	Women's lightweight double sculls
Gold	Alex Gregory; Moe Sbihi; George Nash; Constantine Louloudis	2016 Rio de Janeiro	Rowing	Men's coxless four
Gold	Paul Bennett; Scott Durant; Matt Gotrel; Matt Langridge; Tom Ransley; Pete Reed; Will Satch; Andrew Triggs Hodge; Phelan Hill	2016 Rio de Janeiro	Rowing	Men's eight
Silver	Victoria Thornley; Katherine Grainger	2016 Rio de Janeiro	Rowing	Women's double sculls
Gold	Helen Glover; Heather Stanning	2016 Rio de Janeiro	Rowing	Women's coxless pair
Silver	Katie Greves; Melanie Wilson; Frances Houghton; Polly Swann; Jessica Eddie; Olivia Carnegie-Brown; Karen Bennett; Zoe Lee; Zoe de Toledo	2016 Rio de Janeiro	Rowing	Women's eight
Bronze	Josh Bugajski; Jacob Dawson; Thomas George; Moe Sbihi; Charles Elwes; Oliver Wynne-Griffith; James Rudkin; Thomas Ford; Henry Fieldman	2020 Tokyo	Rowing	Men's eight
Silver	Harry Leask; Angus Groom; Tom Barras; Jack Beaumont	2020 Tokyo	Rowing	Men's quadruple sculls
Silver	Oliver Wynne-Griffith; Thomas George	2024 Paris	Rowing	Men's coxless pair
Bronze	Oliver Wilkes; David Ambler; Matt Aldridge; Freddie Davidson	2024 Paris	Rowing	Men's coxless four
Gold	Morgan Bolding; Sholto Carnegie; Rory Gibbs; Thomas Ford; Jacob Dawson; Charles Elwes; Thomas Digby; James Rudkin; Harry Brightmore c	2024 Paris	Rowing	Men's eight
Bronze	Mathilda Hodgkins-Byrne; Becky Wilde	2024 Paris	Rowing	Women's double sculls
Gold	Lauren Henry; Hannah Scott; Lola Anderson; Georgina Brayshaw	2024 Paris	Rowing	Women's quadruple sculls
Silver	Helen Glover; Esme Booth; Samantha Redgrave; Rebecca Shorten	2024 Paris	Rowing	Women's coxless four
Bronze	Annie Campbell-Orde; Holly Dunford; Emily Ford; Lauren Irwin; Heidi Long; Rowan McKellar; Eve Stewart; Harriet Taylor; Henry Fieldman c	2024 Paris	Rowing	Women's eight
Gold	Emily Craig; Imogen Grant	2024 Paris	Rowing	Women's lightweight double sculls

=== Rugby ===
Great Britain took a silver medal in the first Olympic rugby competition, in 1900. They repeated as silver medallists by losing the only match in 1908. Great Britain did not compete in 1920 or 1924. When the sport returned in 2016 as rugby sevens, Great Britain earned a third silver medal (in men's) as well as placing 4th in the first women's rugby competition.

Year	Players	Events	Gold	Silver	Bronze	Total	Rank
1896	No competition						
1900	15	1	0	1	0	1	2
1904	No competition						
1908	15	1	0	1	0	1	2
1912	No competition						
1920–1924	Did not compete						
1928–2012	No competition						
2016	24	2	0	1	0	1	3
2020	24	2	0	0	0	0	–
2024	12	2	0	0	0	0	–
Total			0	3	0	3	

Event	No. of appearances	First appearance	First medal	First gold medal	Gold	Silver	Bronze	Total	Best finish
Men's rugby union	2/4	1900	1900	—N/a	0	2	0	2	(silver) (1900, 1908)
Men's rugby sevens	2/2	2016	2016	—N/a	0	1	0	1	(silver) (2016)
Women's rugby sevens	2/2	2016	—N/a	—N/a	0	0	0	0	4th (2016, 2020)

=== Sailing ===
Great Britain took four gold medals in the first Olympic sailing events in 1900. In addition, British sailors were part of two mixed teams that won gold.

Year	Sailors	Boats competing/Events	Gold	Silver	Bronze	Total	Ranking
1896	Scheduled but event wasn't held						
1900	73	16/13	4	1	1	6	2
1904	Not Scheduled						
1908	41	7/4	4	1	1	6	1
1912	0	0/4	0	0	0	0	
1916	Games Cancelled						
1920	6	2/14	1	0	0	1	5
1924	6	2/3	0	1	0	1	3
1928	8	2/3	0	0	0	0	
1932	3	2/4	0	1	0	1	5
1936	14	4/4	1	0	1	2	2
1940	Games Cancelled						
1944	Games Cancelled						
1948	13	5/5	1	0	0	1	3
1952	14	5/5	0	1	0	1	6
1956	12	5/5	0	1	2	3	5
1960	11	5/5	0	0	0	0	
1964	9	4/5	0	1	0	1	8
1968	11	5/5	1	0	1	2	2
1972	13	6/6	1	1	0	2	2
1976	12	6/6	1	1	0	2	2
1980	0	0/6	Sport Choose to Boycott				
1984	13	7/7	0	0	1	1	8
1988	15	8/8	1	0	0	1	5
1992	17	10/10	0	0	1	1	9
1996	16	10/10	0	2	0	2	9
2000	16	10/11	3	2	0	5	1
2004	18	11/11	2	1	2	5	1
2008	18	11/11	4	1	1	6	1
2012	16	10/10	1	4	0	5	3
2016	15	10/10	2	1	0	3	1
2020	15	10/10	3	1	1	5	1
2024	14	10/10	1	0	1	2	6
2028							
Total			31	21	13	66	1

==== Medallists ====
Medal	Name	Games	Sport	Event
Gold	Lorne Currie; John Gretton; Linton Hope; Algernon Maudslay	1900 Paris	Sailing	Open class
Gold	Lorne Currie; John Gretton; Linton Hope; Algernon Maudslay	1900 Paris	Sailing	.5 to 1 ton
Gold	Howard Taylor; Edward Hore; Harry Jefferson	1900 Paris	Sailing	3 to 10 ton
Bronze	Edward Hore	1900 Paris	Sailing	10 to 20 ton
Gold	Cecil Quentin	1900 Paris	Sailing	20+ ton
Silver	Selwin Calverley	1900 Paris	Sailing	20+ ton
Gold	Gilbert Laws; Thomas McMeekin; Charles Crichton	1908 London	Sailing	6 metre
Gold	Charles Rivett-Carnac; Norman Bingley; Richard Dixon; Frances Rivett-Carnac	1908 London	Sailing	7 metre
Gold	Blair Cochrane; Charles Campbell; John Rhodes; Henry Sutton; Arthur Wood	1908 London	Sailing	8 metre
Bronze	Blair Cochrane; Charles Campbell; Philip Hunloke; Alfred Hughes; Frederick Hughes; George Ratsey; William Ward; The Duchess of Westminster	1908 London	Sailing	8 metre
Gold	T. C. Glen-Coats; J. H. Downes; J. S. Aspin; John Buchanan; J. C. Bunten; A. D. Downes; David Dunlop; John Mackenzie; Albert Martin; Gerald Tait	1908 London	Sailing	12 metre
Silver	C. MacIver; J. G. Kenion; J. M. Adam; James Baxter; W. P. Davidson; J. F. Jellico; T. A. R. Littledale; C. R. MacIver; C. Macleod Robertson; J. F. D. Spence	1908 London	Sailing	12 metre
Gold	Cyril Wright; Robert Coleman; William Maddison; Dorothy Wright	1920 Antwerp	Sailing	7 metre
Silver	Ernest Roney; Harold Fowler; Edwin Jacob; Thomas Riggs; Walter Riggs	1924 Paris	Sailing	8 metre
Silver	George Colin Ratsey; Peter Jaffe	1932 Los Angeles	Sailing	Star
Bronze	Peter Scott	1936 Berlin	Sailing	O-Jolle
Gold	Christopher Boardman; Miles Bellville; Russell Harmer; Charles Leaf; Leonard Martin	1936 Berlin	Sailing	6 Metre
Gold	Stewart Morris; David Bond	1948 London	Sailing	Swallow
Silver	Charles Currey	1952 Helsinki	Sailing	Finn
Bronze	Jasper Blackall; Terence Smith	1956 Melbourne	Sailing	12m² Sharpie
Bronze	Graham Mann; Ronald Backus; Jonathan Janson	1956 Melbourne	Sailing	Dragon
Silver	Robert Perry; David Bowker; John Dillon; Neil Kennedy-Cochran-Patrick	1956 Melbourne	Sailing	5.5 Metre
Silver	Keith Musto; Tony Morgan	1964 Tokyo	Sailing	Flying Dutchman
Gold	Rodney Pattisson; Iain MacDonald-Smith	1968 Mexico City	Sailing	Flying Dutchman
Bronze	Robin Aisher; Paul Anderson; Adrian Jardine	1968 Mexico City	Sailing	5.5 Metre
Gold	Rodney Pattisson; Christopher Davies	1972 Munich	Sailing	Flying Dutchman
Silver	Alan Warren; David Hunt	1972 Munich	Sailing	Tempest
Silver	Rodney Pattisson; Julian Brooke-Houghton	1976 Montreal	Sailing	Flying Dutchman
Gold	Reginald White; John Osborn	1976 Montreal	Sailing	Tornado
Bronze	Jonathan Richards; Peter Allam	1984 Los Angeles	Sailing	Flying Dutchman
Gold	Michael McIntyre; Bryn Vaile	1988 Seoul	Sailing	Star
Bronze	Lawrie Smith; Robert Cruikshank; Ossie Stewart	1992 Barcelona	Sailing	Soling
Silver	John Merricks; Ian Walker	1996 Atlanta	Sailing	Men's 470
Silver	Ben Ainslie	1996 Atlanta	Sailing	Laser
Gold	Shirley Robertson	2000 Sydney	Sailing	Europe
Gold	Iain Percy	2000 Sydney	Sailing	Finn
Gold	Ben Ainslie	2000 Sydney	Sailing	Laser
Silver	Ian Barker; Simon Hiscocks	2000 Sydney	Sailing	49er
Silver	Ian Walker; Mark Covell	2000 Sydney	Sailing	Star
Gold	Shirley Robertson; Sarah Webb; Sarah Ayton	2004 Athens	Sailing	Yngling
Bronze	Nick Dempsey	2004 Athens	Sailing	Men's Mistral One Design
Gold	Ben Ainslie	2004 Athens	Sailing	Finn
Silver	Nick Rogers; Joe Glanfield	2004 Athens	Sailing	Men's 470
Bronze	Chris Draper; Simon Hiscocks	2004 Athens	Sailing	49er
Bronze	Bryony Shaw	2008 Beijing	Sailing	Women's RS:X
Gold	Sarah Ayton; Sarah Webb; Pippa Wilson	2008 Beijing	Sailing	Yngling
Gold	Paul Goodison	2008 Beijing	Sailing	Laser
Silver	Nick Rogers; Joe Glanfield	2008 Beijing	Sailing	Men's 470
Gold	Iain Percy; Andrew Simpson	2008 Beijing	Sailing	Star
Gold	Ben Ainslie	2008 Beijing	Sailing	Finn
Silver	Nick Dempsey	2012 London	Sailing	Men's RS:X
Gold	Ben Ainslie	2012 London	Sailing	Finn
Silver	Luke Patience; Stuart Bithell	2012 London	Sailing	Men's 470
Silver	Iain Percy; Andrew Simpson	2012 London	Sailing	Star
Silver	Hannah Mills; Saskia Clark	2012 London	Sailing	Women's 470
Silver	Nick Dempsey	2016 Rio de Janeiro	Sailing	Men's RS:X
Gold	Giles Scott	2016 Rio de Janeiro	Sailing	Finn
Gold	Hannah Mills; Saskia Clark	2016 Rio de Janeiro	Sailing	Women's 470
Gold	Giles Scott	2020 Tokyo	Sailing	Finn
Gold	Dylan Fletcher; Stuart Bithell	2020 Tokyo	Sailing	49er
Bronze	Emma Wilson	2020 Tokyo	Sailing	Women's RS:X
Gold	Hannah Mills; Eilidh McIntyre	2020 Tokyo	Sailing	Women's 470
Silver	John Gimson; Anna Burnet	2020 Tokyo	Sailing	Nacra 17
Bronze	Emma Wilson	2024 Paris	Sailing	Women's IQFoil
Gold	Ellie Aldridge	2024 Paris	Sailing	Women's Formula Kite

=== Shooting ===
Great Britain's first shooting medals came when the United Kingdom hosted the 1908 Games, at which the British shooters dominated the competitions. There were 215 shooters from 14 teams in the shooting events, including 67 from Great Britain.

Year	Shooters	Events	Gold	Silver	Bronze	Total	Rank
1896	2	5	0	0	0	0	–
1900	1	9	0	0	0	0	–
1904	Sport not held						
1908	67	15	6	7	8	21	1
1912	38	18	1	4	4	9	4
1920	7	21	0	0	0	0	–
1924	22	10	1	2	0	3	3
1928	Sport not held						
1932		2	0	0	0	0	–
1936		5	0	0	0	0	–
1948	12	5	0	0	0	0	–
1952	12	6	0	0	0	0	–
1956	6	6	0	0	0	0	–
1960	10	6	0	0	0	0	–
1964	8	6	0	0	0	0	–
1968	10	7	1	0	0	1	4
1972	14	7	0	0	1	1	16
1976	13	7	0	0	0	0	–
1980	Did Not Compete						
1984	18	11	1	0	3	4	5
1988	8	13	1	1	0	2	4
1992	7	13	0	0	0	0	–
1996	5	15	0	0	0	0	–
2000	6	17	1	1	0	2	6
2004	6	17	0	0	0	0	–
2008	5	15	0	0	0	0	–
2012	11	15	1	0	0	1	5
2016	6	15	0	0	2	2	17
2020	5	15	0	0	1	1	17
2024	6	15	1	1	0	2	5
2028							
Total			14	16	19	49	6

==== Medallists ====
Medal	Name	Games	Sport	Event
Gold	Joshua Millner	1908 London	Shooting	Men's 1000 yard free rifle
Bronze	Maurice Blood	1908 London	Shooting	Men's 1000 yard free rifle
Silver	Arthur Fulton; John Martin; Harcourt Ommundsen; Walter Padgett; Philip Richardson; Fleetwood Varley	1908 London	Shooting	Men's military rifle, team
Gold	Arthur Carnell	1908 London	Shooting	Men's stationary target small-bore rifle
Silver	Harold Humby	1908 London	Shooting	Men's stationary target small-bore rifle
Bronze	George Barnes	1908 London	Shooting	Men's stationary target small-bore rifle
Gold	John Fleming	1908 London	Shooting	Men's moving target small-bore rifle
Silver	Maurice Matthews	1908 London	Shooting	Men's moving target small-bore rifle
Bronze	William Marsden	1908 London	Shooting	Men's moving target small-bore rifle
Gold	William Styles	1908 London	Shooting	Men's disappearing target small-bore rifle
Silver	Harold Hawkins	1908 London	Shooting	Men's disappearing target small-bore rifle
Bronze	Edward Amoore	1908 London	Shooting	Men's disappearing target small-bore rifle
Gold	Edward Amoore; Harold Humby; Maurice Matthews; William Pimm	1908 London	Shooting	Men's team small-bore rifle
Silver	Ted Ranken	1908 London	Shooting	Men's single-shot running deer
Bronze	Alexander Rogers	1908 London	Shooting	Men's single-shot running deer
Silver	Ted Ranken	1908 London	Shooting	Men's double-shot running deer
Silver	William Ellicott; William Russell Lane-Joynt; Charles Nix; Ted Ranken	1908 London	Shooting	Men's team single-shot running deer
Bronze	Geoffrey Coles; William Ellicott; Henry Lynch-Staunton; Jesse Wallingford	1908 London	Shooting	Men's 50 yard free pistol, team
Bronze	Alexander Maunder	1908 London	Shooting	Men's trap
Gold	Percy Easte; Alexander Maunder; Frederic Moore; Charles Palmer; John Pike; John Postans	1908 London	Shooting	Men's trap, team
Bronze	John Butt; Henry Creasey; Bob Hutton; William Morris; George Skinner; George Whitaker	1908 London	Shooting	Men's trap, team
Bronze	Hugh Durant; Albert Kempster; Horatio Poulter; Charles Stewart	1912 Stockholm	Shooting	Men's 30 metre team rapid fire pistol
Bronze	Charles Stewart	1912 Stockholm	Shooting	Men's 50 metre pistol
Bronze	Hugh Durant; Albert Kempster; Horatio Poulter; Charles Stewart	1912 Stockholm	Shooting	Men's 50 metre team free pistol
Silver	William Milne	1912 Stockholm	Shooting	Men's 50 metre rifle, prone
Bronze	Henry Burt	1912 Stockholm	Shooting	Men's 50 metre rifle, prone
Silver	Henry Burr; Arthur Fulton; Harcourt Ommundsen; Edward Parnell; James Reid; Edward Skilton	1912 Stockholm	Shooting	Men's team military rifle
Silver	William Milne; Joseph Pepé; William Pimm; William Styles	1912 Stockholm	Shooting	Men's 25 metre team small-bore rifle
Gold	Edward Lessimore; Robert Murray; Joseph Pepé; William Pimm	1912 Stockholm	Shooting	Men's 50 metre team small-bore rifle
Silver	John Butt; William Grosvenor; Harold Humby; Alexander Maunder; Charles Palmer; George Whitaker	1912 Stockholm	Shooting	Men's trap, team
Silver	Cyril Mackworth-Praed	1924 Paris	Shooting	Men's 100 metre running deer, single shots
Silver	Cyril Mackworth-Praed	1924 Paris	Shooting	Men's 100 metre running deer, double shots
Gold	Cyril Mackworth-Praed; Philip Neame; Herbert Perry; Allen Whitty	1924 Paris	Shooting	Men's 100 metre team running deer, double shots
Gold	Bob Braithwaite	1968 Mexico City	Shooting	Mixed trap
Bronze	John Kynoch	1972 Munich	Shooting	Mixed 50 metre running target
Bronze	Barry Dagger	1984 Los Angeles	Shooting	Men's 10 metre air rifle
Bronze	Michael Sullivan	1984 Los Angeles	Shooting	Men's 50 metre rifle, prone
Gold	Malcolm Cooper	1984 Los Angeles	Shooting	Men's 50 metre rifle three positions
Bronze	Alister Allan	1984 Los Angeles	Shooting	Men's 50 metre rifle three positions
Gold	Malcolm Cooper	1988 Seoul	Shooting	Men's 50 metre rifle three positions
Silver	Alister Allan	1988 Seoul	Shooting	Men's 50 metre rifle three positions
Silver	Ian Peel	2000 Sydney	Shooting	Men's trap
Gold	Richard Faulds	2000 Sydney	Shooting	Men's double trap
Gold	Peter Wilson	2012 London	Shooting	Men's double trap
Bronze	Edward Ling	2016 Rio de Janeiro	Shooting	Men's trap
Bronze	Steven Scott	2016 Rio de Janeiro	Shooting	Men's double trap
Bronze	Matthew Coward-Holley	2020 Tokyo	Shooting	Men's trap
Gold	Nathan Hales	2024 Paris	Shooting	Men's trap
Silver	Amber Rutter	2024 Paris	Shooting	Women's skeet

=== Short-track speed skating ===
Year	Skaters	Events	Gold	Silver	Bronze	Total	Rank
1988 (demonstration)	4	10	2	0	0	2	2
1992	5	4	0	0	0	0	–
1994	3	6	0	0	1	1	6
1998	5	6	0	0	0	0	–
2002	5	8	0	0	0	0	–
2006	4	8	0	0	0	0	–
2010	7	8	0	0	0	0	–
2014	5	8	0	0	0	0	–
2018	5	8	0	0	0	0	–
2022	3	9	0	0	0	0	–
2026	1	9	0	0	0	0	–
Total			0	0	1	1	13

=== Skateboarding ===
Year	Skateboarders	Events	Gold	Silver	Bronze	Total	Rank
2020	2	4	0	0	1	1	5
2024	3	4	0	0	1	1	5
2028							
Total			0	0	2	2	5

==== Medallists ====
Medal	Name	Games	Sport	Event
Bronze	Sky Brown	2020 Tokyo	Skateboarding	Women's park
Bronze	Sky Brown	2024 Paris	Skateboarding	Women's park

=== Skeleton ===
Great Britain is the most successful team in Skeleton winning a medal at every Games (except 2022) in which the sport has been included and has won at least one medal in each of the five contests of Women's skeleton since its introduction with five different athletes. Lizzy Yarnold is the only rider to defend their gold medal, winning back-to-back titles in 2014 and 2018. Matt Weston became the first athlete to win multiple medals for Great Britain in a single Winter Olympic Games, winning gold in both the men's individual and mixed team events at the 2026 Games.

Year	Racers	Events	Gold	Silver	Bronze	Total	Rank
1928	1	1	0	0	1	1	2
1932–1936	No competition held						
1948	4	1	0	0	1	1	3
1952–1998	No competition held						
2002	2	2	0	0	1	1	3
2006	3	2	0	1	0	1	3
2010	4	2	1	0	0	1	1
2014	4	2	1	0	0	1	2
2018	4	2	1	0	2	3	1
2022	4	2	0	0	0	0	–
2026	5	3	2	0	0	2	1
Total			5	1	5	11	1

=== Ski jumping ===
Year	Skiers	Events	Gold	Silver	Bronze	Total	Rank
1924–1984	Did not compete						
1988	1	2	0	0	0	0	–
1992–1998	Did not compete						
2002	1	2	0	0	0	0	–
2006–2026	Did not compete						
Total			0	0	0	0	–

=== Snowboarding ===
Year	Snowboarders	Events	Gold	Silver	Bronze	Total	Rank
1998	Did not compete						
2002	1	4	0	0	0	0	–
2006	4	6	0	0	0	0	–
2010	4	6	0	0	0	0	–
2014	7	10	0	0	1	1	14
2018	5	10	0	0	1	1	13
2022	3	11	0	0	0	0	–
2026	5	11	1	0	0	1	7
Total			1	0	2	3	15

=== Speed skating ===
Year	Skaters	Events	Gold	Silver	Bronze	Total	Rank
1924	4	5	0	0	0	0	–
1928	3	3	0	0	0	0	–
1932–1936	Did not compete						
1948	5	4	0	0	0	0	–
1952	3	4	0	0	0	0	–
1956	3	4	0	0	0	0	–
1960	2	8	0	0	0	0	–
1964	3	8	0	0	0	0	–
1968	5	8	0	0	0	0	–
1972	2	8	0	0	0	0	–
1976	2	10	0	0	0	0	–
1980	6	10	0	0	0	0	–
1984	1	10	0	0	0	0	–
1988	2	10	0	0	0	0	–
1992	1	10	0	0	0	0	–
1994–2018	Did not compete						
2022	2	14	0	0	0	0	–
2026	1	14	0	0	0	0	–
Total			0	0	0	0	–

=== Sport climbing ===
Year	Climbers	Events	Gold	Silver	Bronze	Total	Rank
2020	1	2	0	0	0	0	–
2024	3	4	1	0	0	1	2
2028							
Total			1	0	0	1	3

==== Medallists ====
Medal	Name	Games	Sport	Event
Gold	Toby Roberts	2024 Paris	Sport climbing	Men's combined

=== Swimming ===
Great Britain was the third most successful team in swimming in 2008, with 2 golds, 2 silvers and 2 bronzes, with Rebecca Adlington winning two of these, making her the most successful female British swimmer in 100 years.

Year	Swimmers	Events	Gold	Silver	Bronze	Total	Rank
1896	Did not compete						
1900	7	7	4	0	1	5	1
1904	Did not compete						
1908	25	6	4	2	1	7	1
1912	18	9	1	2	3	6	5
1920	18	10	0	1	1	2	3
1924	26	11	1	2	1	4	2
1928	21	11	0	2	2	4	7
1932	15	11	0	0	2	2	6
1936	22	11	0	0	0	0	–
1948	32	11	0	0	1	1	7
1952	26	11	0	0	1	1	9
1956	22	13	1	0	1	2	4
1960	32	15	1	1	1	3	3
1964	33	18	0	1	0	1	6
1968	27	29	0	1	0	1	9
1972	36	29	0	1	0	1	10
1976	40	26	1	1	1	3	5
1980	32	26	1	3	1	5	4
1984	33	29	0	1	4	5	6
1988	31	31	1	1	1	3	5
1992	28	31	0	0	1	1	16
1996	39	32	0	1	1	2	12
2000	32	32	0	0	0	0	–
2004	37	32	0	0	2	2	18
2008	24	32	2	0	1	3	4
2012	44	34	0	1	2	3	14
2016	28	34	1	5	0	6	6
2020	32	37	4	3	1	8	3
2024	33	37	1	4	0	5	9
2028							
Total			23	33	30	86	6

==== Medallists ====
Medal	Name	Games	Sport	Event
Gold	Frederick Lane	1900 Paris	Swimming	Men's 200 metre freestyle
Gold	John Arthur Jarvis	1900 Paris	Swimming	Men's 1000 metre freestyle
Gold	John Arthur Jarvis	1900 Paris	Swimming	Men's 4000 metre freestyle
Gold	Frederick Lane	1900 Paris	Swimming	Men's 200 metre obstacle event
Bronze	Peter Kemp	1900 Paris	Swimming	Men's 200 metre obstacle event
Gold	Henry Taylor	1908 London	Swimming	Men's 400 metre freestyle
Gold	Henry Taylor	1908 London	Swimming	Men's 1500 metre freestyle
Silver	Thomas Battersby	1908 London	Swimming	Men's 1500 metre freestyle
Bronze	Herbert Haresnape	1908 London	Swimming	Men's 100 metre backstroke
Gold	Frederick Holman	1908 London	Swimming	Men's 200 metre breaststroke
Silver	William Robinson	1908 London	Swimming	Men's 200 metre breaststroke
Gold	John Derbyshire; Paul Radmilovic; William Foster; Henry Taylor	1908 London	Swimming	Men's 4 x 200 metre freestyle relay
Silver	John Hatfield	1912 Stockholm	Swimming	Men's 400 metre freestyle
Silver	John Hatfield	1912 Stockholm	Swimming	Men's 1500 metre freestyle
Bronze	Percy Courtman	1912 Stockholm	Swimming	Men's 400 metre breaststroke
Bronze	William Foster; Thomas Battersby; John Hatfield; Henry Taylor	1912 Stockholm	Swimming	Men's 4 x 200 metre freestyle relay
Bronze	Jennie Fletcher	1912 Stockholm	Swimming	Women's 100 metre freestyle
Gold	Belle Moore; Jennie Fletcher; Annie Speirs; Irene Steer	1912 Stockholm	Swimming	Women's 4 x 100 metre freestyle relay
Bronze	Harold Annison; Edward Peter; Leslie Savage; Henry Taylor	1920 Antwerp	Swimming	Men's 4 x 200 metre freestyle relay
Silver	Hilda James; Constance Jeans; Grace McKenzie; Charlotte Radcliffe	1920 Antwerp	Swimming	Women's 4 x 100 metre freestyle relay
Silver	Phyllis Harding	1924 Paris	Swimming	Women's 100 metre backstroke
Gold	Lucy Morton	1924 Paris	Swimming	Women's 200 metre breaststroke
Bronze	Gladys Carson	1924 Paris	Swimming	Women's 200 metre breaststroke
Silver	Florence Barker; Constance Jeans; Grace McKenzie; Iris Tanner	1924 Paris	Swimming	Women's 4 x 100 metre freestyle relay
Bronze	Joyce Cooper	1928 Amsterdam	Swimming	Women's 100 metre freestyle
Silver	Ellen King	1928 Amsterdam	Swimming	Women's 100 metre backstroke
Bronze	Joyce Cooper	1928 Amsterdam	Swimming	Women's 100 metre backstroke
Silver	Joyce Cooper; Ellen King; Cissie Stewart; Iris Tanner	1928 Amsterdam	Swimming	Women's 4 x 100 metre freestyle relay
Bronze	Valerie Davies	1932 Los Angeles	Swimming	Women's 100 metre backstroke
Bronze	Joyce Cooper; Valerie Davies; Edna Hughes; Helen Varcoe	1932 Los Angeles	Swimming	Women's 4 x 100 metre freestyle relay
Bronze	Catherine Gibson	1948 London	Swimming	Women's 400 metre freestyle
Bronze	Helen Gordon	1952 Helsinki	Swimming	Women's 200 metre breaststroke
Gold	Judy Grinham	1956 Melbourne	Swimming	Women's 100 metre backstroke
Bronze	Margaret Edwards	1956 Melbourne	Swimming	Women's 100 metre backstroke
Bronze	Natalie Steward	1960 Rome	Swimming	Women's 100 metre freestyle
Silver	Natalie Steward	1960 Rome	Swimming	Women's 100 metre backstroke
Gold	Anita Lonsbrough	1960 Rome	Swimming	Women's 200 metre breaststroke
Silver	Robert McGregor	1964 Tokyo	Swimming	Men's 100 metre freestyle
Silver	Martyn Woodroffe	1968 Mexico City	Swimming	Men's 200 metre butterfly
Silver	David Wilkie	1972 Munich	Swimming	Men's 200 metre breaststroke
Silver	David Wilkie	1976 Montreal	Swimming	Men's 100 metre breaststroke
Gold	David Wilkie	1976 Montreal	Swimming	Men's 200 metre breaststroke
Bronze	Alan McClatchey; Brian Brinkley; Gordon Downie; David Dunne	1976 Montreal	Swimming	Men's 4 x 200 metre freestyle relay
Gold	Duncan Goodhew	1980 Moscow	Swimming	Men's 100 metre breaststroke
Silver	Phil Hubble	1980 Moscow	Swimming	Men's 200 metre butterfly
Bronze	Gary Abraham; Duncan Goodhew; David Lowe; Martin Smith; Paul Marshall; Mark Taylor	1980 Moscow	Swimming	Men's 4 x 100 metre medley relay
Silver	Sharron Davies	1980 Moscow	Swimming	Women's 400 metre individual medley
Silver	Helen Jameson; Margaret Kelly; Ann Osgerby; June Croft	1980 Moscow	Swimming	Women's 4 x 100 metre medley relay
Bronze	Neil Cochran	1984 Los Angeles	Swimming	Men's 200 metre individual medley
Bronze	Neil Cochran; Paul Easter; Paul Howe; Andrew Astbury	1984 Los Angeles	Swimming	Men's 4 x 200 metre freestyle relay
Silver	Sarah Hardcastle	1984 Los Angeles	Swimming	Women's 400 metre freestyle
Bronze	June Croft	1984 Los Angeles	Swimming	Women's 400 metre freestyle
Bronze	Sarah Hardcastle	1984 Los Angeles	Swimming	Women's 800 metre freestyle
Gold	Adrian Moorhouse	1988 Seoul	Swimming	Men's 100 metre breaststroke
Silver	Nick Gillingham	1988 Seoul	Swimming	Men's 200 metre breaststroke
Bronze	Andy Jameson	1988 Seoul	Swimming	Men's 100 metre butterfly
Bronze	Nick Gillingham	1992 Barcelona	Swimming	Men's 200 metre breaststroke
Silver	Paul Palmer	1996 Atlanta	Swimming	Men's 400 metre freestyle
Bronze	Graeme Smith	1996 Atlanta	Swimming	Men's 1500 metre freestyle
Bronze	David Davies	2004 Athens	Swimming	Men's 1500 metre freestyle
Bronze	Stephen Parry	2004 Athens	Swimming	Men's 200 metre butterfly
Gold	Rebecca Adlington	2008 Beijing	Swimming	Women's 400 metre freestyle
Bronze	Joanne Jackson	2008 Beijing	Swimming	Women's 400 metre freestyle
Gold	Rebecca Adlington	2008 Beijing	Swimming	Women's 800 metre freestyle
Silver	Michael Jamieson	2012 London	Swimming	Men's 200 metre breaststroke
Bronze	Rebecca Adlington	2012 London	Swimming	Women's 400 metre freestyle
Bronze	Rebecca Adlington	2012 London	Swimming	Women's 800 metre freestyle
Gold	Adam Peaty	2016 Rio de Janeiro	Swimming	Men's 100 metre breaststroke
Silver	Stephen Milne; Duncan Scott; Daniel Wallace; James Guy; Robbie Renwick	2016 Rio de Janeiro	Swimming	Men's 4 x 200 metre freestyle relay
Silver	Chris Walker-Hebborn; Adam Peaty; James Guy; Duncan Scott	2016 Rio de Janeiro	Swimming	Men's 4 x 100 metre medley relay
Silver	Jazmin Carlin	2016 Rio de Janeiro	Swimming	Women's 400 metre freestyle
Silver	Jazmin Carlin	2016 Rio de Janeiro	Swimming	Women's 800 metre freestyle
Silver	Siobhan-Marie O'Connor	2016 Rio de Janeiro	Swimming	Women's 200 metre individual medley
Gold	Tom Dean	2020 Tokyo	Swimming	Men's 200 metre freestyle
Silver	Duncan Scott	2020 Tokyo	Swimming	Men's 200 metre freestyle
Bronze	Luke Greenbank	2020 Tokyo	Swimming	Men's 200 metre backstroke
Gold	Adam Peaty	2020 Tokyo	Swimming	Men's 100 metre breaststroke
Silver	Duncan Scott	2020 Tokyo	Swimming	Men's 200 metre individual medley
Gold	Tom Dean; James Guy; Matthew Richards; Duncan Scott; Calum Jarvis	2020 Tokyo	Swimming	Men's 4 x 200 metre freestyle relay
Silver	Luke Greenbank; Adam Peaty; James Guy; Duncan Scott; James Wilby	2020 Tokyo	Swimming	Men's 4 x 100 metre medley relay
Gold	Kathleen Dawson; Adam Peaty; James Guy; Anna Hopkin; Freya Anderson	2020 Tokyo	Swimming	Mixed 4 x 100 metre medley relay
Silver	Ben Proud	2024 Paris	Swimming	Men's 50 metre freestyle
Silver	Matthew Richards	2024 Paris	Swimming	Men's 200 metre freestyle
Silver	Adam Peaty	2024 Paris	Swimming	Men's 100 metre breaststroke
Silver	Duncan Scott	2024 Paris	Swimming	Men's 200 metre individual medley
Gold	James Guy; Tom Dean; Matthew Richards; Duncan Scott; Jack McMillan; Kieran Bird	2024 Paris	Swimming	Men's 4 x 200 metre freestyle relay

=== Table tennis ===
Year	Players	Events	Gold	Silver	Bronze	Total	Rank
1988	4	4	0	0	0	0	–
1992	6	4	0	0	0	0	–
1996	4	4	0	0	0	0	–
2000	1	4	0	0	0	0	–
2004	Did not compete						
2008	Did not compete						
2012	6	4	0	0	0	0	–
2016	3	4	0	0	0	0	–
2020	3	5	0	0	0	0	–
2024	2	5	0	0	0	0	–
2028							
Total			0	0	0	0	–

=== Taekwondo ===
Great Britain have competed in all six taekwondo competitions that have taken place since 2000. Their best result is a gold, silver and bronze in 2016.

Year	Taekwondokas	Events	Gold	Silver	Bronze	Total	Rank
2000	2	8	0	0	0	0	–
2004	4	8	0	0	0	0	–
2008	3	8	0	0	1	1	15
2012	4	8	1	0	1	2	5
2016	4	8	1	1	1	3	3
2020	5	8	0	2	1	3	8
2024	4	8	0	1	0	1	9
2028							
Total			2	4	4	10	5

==== Medallists ====
Medal	Name	Games	Sport	Event
Bronze	Sarah Stevenson	2008 Beijing	Taekwondo	Women's Heavyweight (+67 kg)
Gold	Jade Jones	2012 London	Taekwondo	Women's Lightweight (57 kg)
Bronze	Lutalo Muhammad	2012 London	Taekwondo	Men's Middleweight (80 kg)
Gold	Jade Jones	2016 Rio de Janeiro	Taekwondo	Women's Featherweight (57 kg)
Silver	Lutalo Muhammad	2016 Rio de Janeiro	Taekwondo	Men's Welterweight (80 kg)
Bronze	Bianca Walkden	2016 Rio de Janeiro	Taekwondo	Women's Heavyweight (+67 kg)
Silver	Bradly Sinden	2020 Tokyo	Taekwondo	Men's Featherweight (68 kg)
Silver	Lauren Williams	2020 Tokyo	Taekwondo	Women's Welterweight (67 kg)
Bronze	Bianca Walkden	2020 Tokyo	Taekwondo	Women's Heavyweight (+67 kg)
Silver	Caden Cunningham	2024 Paris	Taekwondo	Men's Heavyweight (+80 kg)

=== Tennis ===
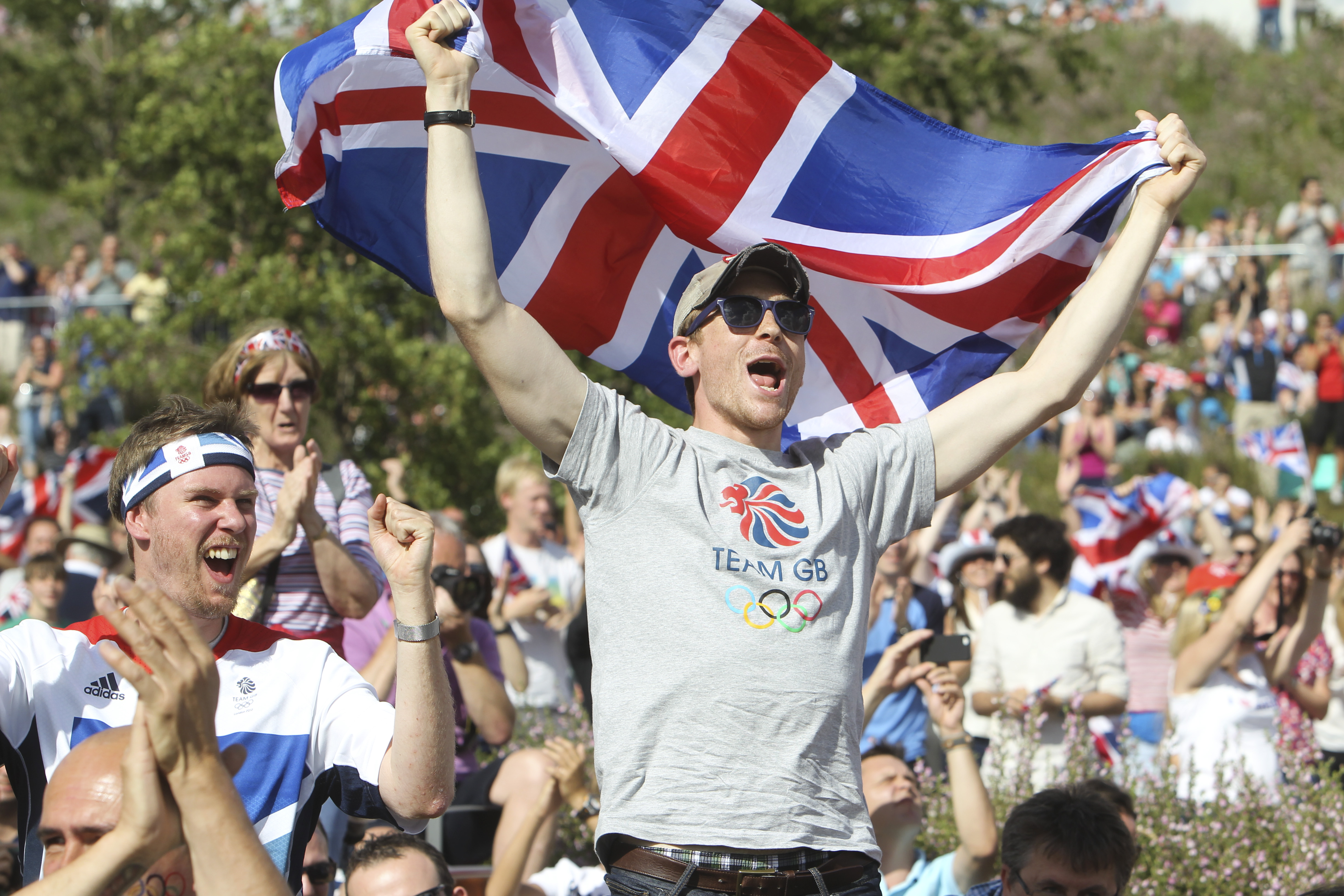
Fans celebrate Great Britain men's tennis player Andy Murray winning gold, 5 August 2012.

John Pius Boland dominated the 1896 tennis tournaments. Tennis in 1896 was a sport that allowed mixed teams, and both Boland and George S. Robertson joined partners from other nations to win their medals. Great Britain again dominated in 1900, taking all four gold medals and adding seven others (three as part of mixed teams).

Year	Players	Events	Gold	Silver	Bronze	Total	Rank
1896	2	2	1	0	0	1	2
1900	6	4	4	1	3	8	1
1904	Did not compete						
1908	22	6	6	5	4	15	1
1912	11	8	2	2	2	6	2
1920	8	5	2	3	1	6	1
1924	10	5	0	1	2	3	3
1924–1964	No competition held						
1968 (demonstration)	Did not compete						
1972–1980	No competition held						
1984 (demonstration)	3	4	0	0	0	0	–
1988	5	4	0	0	0	0	–
1992	6	4	0	0	0	0	–
1996	5	4	0	1	0	1	5
2000	6	4	0	0	0	0	–
2004	1	4	0	0	0	0	–
2008	2	4	0	0	0	0	–
2012	8	5	1	1	0	2	2
2016	7	5	1	0	0	1	2
2020	6	5	0	0	0	0	–
2024	7	5	0	0	0	0	–
2028							
Total			17	14	12	43	2

==== Medallists ====
Medal	Name	Games	Sport	Event
Gold	John Boland	1896 Athens	Tennis	Men's singles
Gold	Laurence Doherty	1900 Paris	Tennis	Men's singles
Silver	Harold Mahony	1900 Paris	Tennis	Men's singles
Bronze	Reginald Doherty	1900 Paris	Tennis	Men's singles
Bronze	Arthur Norris	1900 Paris	Tennis	Men's singles
Gold	Laurence Doherty; Reginald Doherty	1900 Paris	Tennis	Men's doubles
Bronze	Harold Mahony; Arthur Norris	1900 Paris	Tennis	Men's doubles
Gold	Charlotte Cooper	1900 Paris	Tennis	Women's singles
Gold	Charlotte Cooper; Reginald Doherty	1900 Paris	Tennis	Mixed doubles
Gold	Major Ritchie	1908 London	Tennis	Men's outdoor singles
Bronze	Wilberforce Eaves	1908 London	Tennis	Men's outdoor singles
Gold	Reginald Doherty; George Hillyard	1908 London	Tennis	Men's outdoor doubles
Silver	James Cecil Parke; Major Ritchie	1908 London	Tennis	Men's outdoor doubles
Bronze	Clement Cazalet; Charles Dixon	1908 London	Tennis	Men's outdoor doubles
Gold	Dorothea Lambert Chambers	1908 London	Tennis	Women's outdoor singles
Silver	Dora Boothby	1908 London	Tennis	Women's outdoor singles
Bronze	Ruth Winch	1908 London	Tennis	Women's outdoor singles
Gold	Arthur Gore	1908 London	Tennis	Men's indoor singles
Silver	George Caridia	1908 London	Tennis	Men's indoor singles
Bronze	Major Ritchie	1908 London	Tennis	Men's indoor singles
Gold	Herbert Roper Barrett; Arthur Gore	1908 London	Tennis	Men's indoor doubles
Silver	George Caridia; George Simond	1908 London	Tennis	Men's indoor doubles
Gold	Gwendoline Eastlake-Smith	1908 London	Tennis	Women's indoor singles
Silver	Alice Greene	1908 London	Tennis	Women's indoor singles
Silver	Charles Dixon	1912 Stockholm	Tennis	Men's indoor singles
Bronze	Alfred Beamish; Charles Dixon	1912 Stockholm	Tennis	Men's indoor doubles
Gold	Edith Hannam	1912 Stockholm	Tennis	Women's indoor singles
Bronze	Mabel Parton	1912 Stockholm	Tennis	Women's indoor singles
Gold	Edith Hannam; Charles Dixon	1912 Stockholm	Tennis	Mixed indoor doubles
Silver	Helen Aitchison; Herbert Roper Barrett	1912 Stockholm	Tennis	Mixed indoor doubles
Gold	Noel Turnbull; Max Woosnam	1920 Antwerp	Tennis	Men's doubles
Silver	Dorothy Holman	1920 Antwerp	Tennis	Women's singles
Bronze	Kathleen McKane	1920 Antwerp	Tennis	Women's singles
Gold	Kathleen McKane; Winifred McNair	1920 Antwerp	Tennis	Women's doubles
Silver	Winifred Beamish; Dorothy Holman	1920 Antwerp	Tennis	Women's doubles
Silver	Kathleen McKane; Max Woosnam	1920 Antwerp	Tennis	Mixed doubles
Bronze	Kathleen McKane	1924 Paris	Tennis	Women's singles
Silver	Phyllis Covell; Kathleen McKane	1924 Paris	Tennis	Women's doubles
Bronze	Evelyn Colyer; Dorothy Shepherd-Barron	1924 Paris	Tennis	Women's doubles
Silver	Neil Broad; Tim Henman	1996 Atlanta	Tennis	Men's doubles
Gold	Andy Murray	2012 London	Tennis	Men's singles
Silver	Laura Robson; Andy Murray	2012 London	Tennis	Mixed doubles
Gold	Andy Murray	2016 Rio de Janeiro	Tennis	Men's singles

=== Triathlon ===
Great Britain have competed in all Six triathlon competitions that have taken place since 2000. Their best finish is two 1st-place finishes in the men's individual triathlon event and a 1st-place finish in the mixed triathlon relay event, in 2020(2021).

Year	Triathletes	Events	Gold	Silver	Bronze	Total	Rank
2000	6	2	0	0	0	0	–
2004	6	2	0	0	0	0	–
2008	5	2	0	0	0	0	–
2012	6	2	1	0	1	2	1
2016	6	2	1	1	1	3	1
2020	5	3	1	2	0	3	1
2024	5	3	1	0	2	3	1
2028							
Total			4	3	4	11	1

==== Medallists ====
Medal	Name	Games	Sport	Event
Gold	Alistair Brownlee	2012 London	Triathlon	Men's individual
Bronze	Jonathan Brownlee	2012 London	Triathlon	Men's individual
Gold	Alistair Brownlee	2016 Rio de Janeiro	Triathlon	Men's individual
Silver	Jonathan Brownlee	2016 Rio de Janeiro	Triathlon	Men's individual
Bronze	Vicky Holland	2016 Rio de Janeiro	Triathlon	Women's individual
Silver	Alex Yee	2020 Tokyo	Triathlon	Men's individual
Silver	Georgia Taylor-Brown	2020 Tokyo	Triathlon	Women's individual
Gold	Jess Learmonth; Jonathan Brownlee; Georgia Taylor-Brown; Alex Yee	2020 Tokyo	Triathlon	Mixed relay
Gold	Alex Yee	2024 Paris	Triathlon	Men's individual
Bronze	Beth Potter	2024 Paris	Triathlon	Women's individual
Bronze	Alex Yee; Georgia Taylor-Brown; Sam Dickinson; Beth Potter	2024 Paris	Triathlon	Mixed relay

=== Tug of war ===
Great Britain's Olympic tug of war debut came when the United Kingdom hosted the Games in 1908. Great Britain was then one of only two teams to compete in 1912 and also won the last Tug of War competition held in the Olympics in 1920.

Year	Contestants	Events	Gold	Silver	Bronze	Total	Rank
1908	24	1	1	1	1	3	1
1912	8	1	0	1	0	1	2
1920	11	1	1	0	0	1	1
1924–present	No Competition						
Total	43	3	2	2	1	5	1

=== Volleyball ===
Prior to participating, as host nation, in the 2012 volleyball tournaments, Great Britain had never competed in Olympic volleyball with the exception of the women's team participating in the inaugural Beach volleyball tournament in 1996.

Year	Players	Events	Gold	Silver	Bronze	Total	Rank
1964–1992	Did not compete						
1996	2	4	0	0	0	0	–
2000–2008	Did not compete						
2012	28	4	0	0	0	0	–
2016–2024	Did not compete						
Total	–	–	0	0	0	0	–

=== Water motorsports ===
The United Kingdom hosted the only Olympic water motorsports contests, in 1908.

Year	Athletes	Events	Gold	Silver	Bronze	Total	Rank
1908	13	3	2	0	0	2	1

==== Medallists ====
Medal	Name	Games	Sport	Event
Gold	John Field-Richards; Bernard Boverton Redwood; Isaac Thomas Thornycroft	1908 London	Water motorsports	Class B
Gold	John Field-Richards; Bernard Boverton Redwood; Isaac Thomas Thornycroft	1908 London	Water motorsports	Class C

=== Water polo ===
Year	Players	Events	Gold	Silver	Bronze	Total	Rank
1900		1	0	0	0	0	-
1904	Did not compete						
1908	7	1	1	0	0	1	1
1912	7	1	1	0	0	1	1
1920	7	1	1	0	0	1	1
1924		1	0	0	0	0	–
1928		1	0	0	0	0	–
1932	Did not compete						
1936		1	0	0	0	0	–
1948		1	0	0	0	0	–
1952		1	0	0	0	0	–
1956		1	0	0	0	0	–
1960–2008	Did not compete						
2012	26	2	0	0	0	0	–
2016–2024	Did not compete						
Total	–	–	3	0	0	3	5

==== Medallists ====
Medal	Name	Games	Sport	Event
Gold	George Cornet; Charles Forsyth; George Nevinson; Paul Radmilovic; Charles Smith; Thomas Thould; George Wilkinson	1908 London	Water polo	Men's tournament
Gold	Charles Sydney Smith; George Cornet; George Wilkinson; Charles Bugbee; Arthur Edwin Hill; Paul Radmilovic; Isaac Bentham	1912 Stockholm	Water polo	Men's tournament
Gold	Charles Sydney Smith; Paul Radmilovic; Charles Bugbee; Noel Purcell; Christopher Jones; William Peacock; William Henry Dean	1920 Antwerp	Water polo	Men's tournament

=== Weightlifting ===
Great Britain's only gold medal in weightlifting came at the first Games in 1896, when Launceston Elliot won the one-hand lift.

Year	Weightlifters	Events	Gold	Silver	Bronze	Total	Rank
1896	1	2	1	1	0	2	1
1900	Sport not held						
1904	Did not compete						
1908	Sport not held						
1912	Sport not held						
1920–1936	22	5	0	0	0	0	–
1948	10	6	0	1	1	2	3
1952	5	7	0	0	0	0	–
1956	5	7	0	0	0	0	–
1960	7	7	0	0	1	1	6
1964	5	7	0	1	0	1	7
1968	7	7	0	0	0	0	–
1972	9	9	0	0	0	0	–
1976	8	9	0	0	0	0	–
1980	10	10	0	0	0	0	–
1984	10	10	0	0	1	1	10
1988	10	10	0	0	0	0	–
1992	6	10	0	0	0	0	–
1996	1	10	0	0	0	0	–
2000	1	15	0	0	0	0	–
2004	2	15	0	0	0	0	–
2008	1	15	0	0	0	0	–
2012	5	15	0	0	0	0	–
2016	2	15	0	0	0	0	–
2020	4	14	0	1	0	1	14
2024	1	10	0	0	1	1	16
2028							
Total			1	4	4	9	35

==== Medallists ====
Medal	Name	Games	Sport	Event
Gold	Launceston Elliot	1896 Athens	Weightlifting	Men's one hand lift
Silver	Launceston Elliot	1896 Athens	Weightlifting	Men's two hand lift
Silver	Julian Creus	1948 London	Weightlifting	Men's 56 kg
Bronze	James Halliday	1948 London	Weightlifting	Men's 67.5 kg
Bronze	Louis Martin	1960 Rome	Weightlifting	Men's 90 kg
Silver	Louis Martin	1964 Tokyo	Weightlifting	Men's 90 kg
Bronze	David Mercer	1984 Los Angeles	Weightlifting	Men's 90 kg
Silver	Emily Campbell	2020 Tokyo	Weightlifting	Women's +87 kg
Bronze	Emily Campbell	2024 Paris	Weightlifting	Women's +81 kg

=== Wrestling ===
Year	Wrestlers	Events	Gold	Silver	Bronze	Total	Rank
1896	1	1	0	0	0	0	–
1900	Sport not held						
1904	Did not compete						
1908	53	9	3	4	4	11	1
1912	12	5	0	0	0	0	–
1920	10	10	0	0	2	2	6
1924	14	13	0	0	1	1	9
1928	6	13	0	0	1	1	12
1932	2	14	0	0	0	0	-
1936	6	14	0	0	0	0	-
1948	16	16	0	0	0	0	-
1952	6	16	0	0	1	1	-
1956	4	16	0	0	0	0	-
1960	6	16	0	0	0	0	-
1964	6	16	0	0	0	0	-
1968	4	16	0	0	0	0	-
1972	6	20	0	0	0	0	–
1976	6	20	0	0	0	0	–
1980	6	20	0	0	0	0	–
1984	7	20	0	0	1	1	14
1988	7	20	0	0	0	0	–
1992	1	20	0	0	0	0	–
1996	1	20	0	0	0	0	–
2000	Did not compete						
2004	1	18	0	0	0	0	–
2008	Did not compete						
2012	1	18	0	0	0	0	–
2016–2024	Did not compete						
Total			3	4	10	17	28

==== Medallists ====
Medal	Name	Games	Sport	Event
Silver	William J. Press	1908 London	Wrestling	Men's freestyle bantamweight
Silver	James Slim	1908 London	Wrestling	Men's freestyle featherweight
Bronze	William McKie	1908 London	Wrestling	Men's freestyle featherweight
Gold	George de Relwyskow	1908 London	Wrestling	Men's freestyle lightweight
Silver	William Wood	1908 London	Wrestling	Men's freestyle lightweight
Bronze	Albert Gingell	1908 London	Wrestling	Men's freestyle lightweight
Gold	Stanley Bacon	1908 London	Wrestling	Men's freestyle middleweight
Silver	George de Relwyskow	1908 London	Wrestling	Men's freestyle middleweight
Bronze	Frederick Beck	1908 London	Wrestling	Men's freestyle middleweight
Gold	Con O'Kelly	1908 London	Wrestling	Men's freestyle heavyweight
Bronze	Edward Barrett	1908 London	Wrestling	Men's freestyle heavyweight
Bronze	Bernard Bernard	1920 Antwerp	Wrestling	Men's freestyle featherweight
Bronze	Herbert Wright	1920 Antwerp	Wrestling	Men's freestyle lightweight
Bronze	Archie MacDonald	1924 Paris	Wrestling	Men's freestyle heavyweight
Bronze	Samuel Rabin	1928 Amsterdam	Wrestling	Men's freestyle middleweight
Bronze	Kenneth Richmond	1952 Helsinki	Wrestling	Men's freestyle heavyweight
Bronze	Noel Loban	1984 Los Angeles	Wrestling	Men's freestyle 90 kg

== Medals in art competitions ==
In addition to its accomplishments in sport, Great Britain has also earned recognition in Olympic art competitions—one of the three non-sports events once included in the Olympic Games. The country won a total of nine art competition medals (3 gold, 5 silver and 1 bronze), across the 1920, 1924, 1928, 1932 and 1948 Summer Olympics. These events were part of the official Olympic program in seven Summer Games, from 1912 to 1948. In 1952, the International Olympic Committee (IOC) formally discontinued all non-sport events (including art competitions), as well as awards for feats (such as alpinism and aeronautics). These were subsequently removed from official national medal counts.

=== Medallists ===
Medal	Name	Games	Event	Piece
Silver	Theodore Andrea Cook	(Belgium) 1920 Antwerp	Literature	"Olympic Games of Antwerp"
Silver	Margaret Stuart	(France) 1924 Paris	Literature	"Sword Songs"
Gold	William Nicholson	(Netherlands) 1928 Amsterdam	Painting, Graphic Arts	"Un Almanach de douze Sports"
Silver	Laura Knight	(Netherlands) 1928 Amsterdam	Painting, Paintings	"Boxeurs"
Gold	John Hughes	(United States) 1932 Los Angeles	Architecture, Town planning	Design for a Sports and Recreation Centre with Stadium, for the City of Liverpool
Gold	Alfred Thomson	(United Kingdom) 1948 London	Painting, Paintings	"London Amateur Championships"
Silver	John Copley	(United Kingdom) 1948 London	Painting, Graphic Arts	"Polo Players"
Silver	Chintamoni Kar	(United Kingdom) 1948 London	Sculpturing, Statues	"The Stag"
Bronze	Rosamund Fletcher	(United Kingdom) 1948 London	Sculpturing, Reliefs	"The End of the Covert"

== See also ==
- List of flag bearers for Great Britain at the Olympics
- Category:Olympic competitors for Great Britain
- Great Britain at the Paralympics
- Great Britain at the European Games
- Great Britain at the Youth Olympics
- Sport in the United Kingdom
- Sport in England
- Sport in Northern Ireland
- Sport in Scotland
- Sport in Wales
