= Olympic sports =

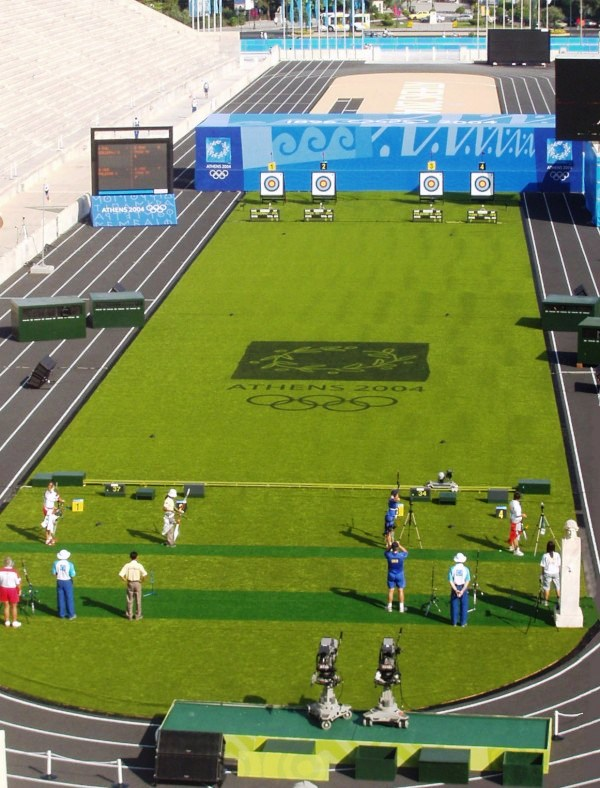
Archery competition held during the Athens 2004 Summer Olympics. Dropped from the Olympic program after the 1920 Antwerp games, it was reinstated in 1972.

Olympic sports are sports that are contested in the Summer Olympic Games and Winter Olympic Games. The 2024 Summer Olympics included 32 sports; the 2022 Winter Olympics included seven sports. Each Olympic sport is represented at the International Olympic Committee (IOC) by an international governing body called an International Federation (IF).

The 2020 Summer Olympics in Tokyo saw the introduction of four new sports, with karate, skateboarding, sport climbing and surfing making their Olympic debuts. Breakdancing made its debut at the 2024 Summer Olympics in Paris, and ski mountaineering made its debut at the 2026 Winter Olympics in Italy. Flag football and squash will make their debuts at the 2028 Summer Olympics in Los Angeles, while cricket and lacrosse will return after long absences.

== Early history and scope ==
From the 18th century onwards, researchers took a greater interest in the value of traditional games in elucidating cultural values and identities. The modern Olympic Games, founded by Pierre de Coubertin on the basis of "All games, all nations", were influenced by this thinking; at the 1904 Summer Olympics, de Coubertin arranged "Anthropological Days", which allowed athletes from Asia, Africa, and South America to demonstrate their regional games. However, the 1904 organizers marginalized this aspect of the Olympics, and it quickly faded away after a few years, with mainly only Western sports being played.

== Olympic sports definitions ==
The International Olympic Committee (IOC) considers an Olympic sport to comprise all disciplines governed by an international sports federation. A discipline is defined as one or more events within a sport requiring either a dedicated field of play or a significant modification of another discipline's field of play, generally involving a separate group of athletes. For example, aquatics is a summer Olympic sport that includes six disciplines: swimming, artistic swimming, diving, water polo, open water swimming, and high diving (a non-Olympic discipline), all of which are governed at the international level by World Aquatics. Skating is a winter Olympic sport represented by the International Skating Union, and includes three IOC-recognized disciplines: figure skating, speed skating and short-track speed skating. The sport with the largest number of Olympic disciplines is skiing, with six: alpine skiing, cross-country skiing, ski jumping, snowboarding, freestyle skiing and freeriding.

Other notable multi-discipline sports are gymnastics (artistic, rhythmic, and trampoline), cycling (road, track, mountain, and BMX), volleyball (indoors and beach), wrestling (freestyle and Greco-Roman), canoeing (flatwater and slalom), and bobsleigh (includes skeleton). The disciplines listed here are only those contested in the Olympics—gymnastics has two non-Olympic disciplines, while cycling and wrestling have three each.

The IOC definition of a "discipline" may differ from that used by an international federation. For example, the IOC considers artistic gymnastics a single discipline, but the International Federation of Gymnastics (FIG) classifies men's and women's artistic gymnastics as separate disciplines. Similarly, the IOC considers freestyle wrestling to be a single discipline, but United World Wrestling classifies women's freestyle wrestling as the separate discipline of "female wrestling".

An event, by IOC definition, is a competition that leads to the award of medals. Therefore, the sport of aquatics includes a total of 46 Olympic events, of which 32 are in the discipline of swimming, eight in diving, and two each in artistic swimming, water polo, and open water swimming. The number of events per sport ranges from a minimum of two (until 2008, there were sports with only one event) to a maximum of 48 in athletics, which despite its large number of diverse events is not divided into separate disciplines like aquatics is.

== Criteria for inclusion and thresholds ==
Sports eligible for inclusion in the Olympic programme are only those governed by international federations recognized by the IOC, as stated in Bye-laws 1.3.2 and 1.4.2 to Rule 45 of the Olympic Charter (2023). The opportunity to propose additional sports to the programme is at the full discretion of the respective Organizing Committee of the Olympic Games and subject to the final decision of the IOC Session.

In the past, several criteria concerning widely practiced sports, disciplines or events have been abolished. However, the number of sports remains constrained by athlete and event limits. According to Bye-law 3.2 to Rule 45 of the Olympic Charter (2023), Summer Olympics should be approximately limited to 10,500 athletes, 5,000 coaches and support personnel and 310 events, while Winter Olympics should be capped at around 2,900 athletes, 2,000 coaches and support personnel and 100 events, unless agreed to otherwise by the Organizing Committee. These thresholds are likely to be surpassed for the 2028 Summer Olympics; sports director Kit McConnell stated that they would aim to "limit the increase, but limit the impact on the existing sport".

In previous years, sports that depend primarily on mechanical propulsion, such as motor sports, could not be considered for recognition as Olympic sports, though there were power-boating events in 1908 before this rule was enacted by the IOC. The rule excluding motorsports was removed from the Olympic Charter in 2016. The FIA (governing body for automobile sports), FIM (governing body for motorcycle sports), FAI (governing body for air sports) and UIM (governing body for powerboating) are recognized by the International Olympic Committee, and therefore, in theory, could be eligible for inclusion at future Olympic Games.

== Changes in Olympic sports ==
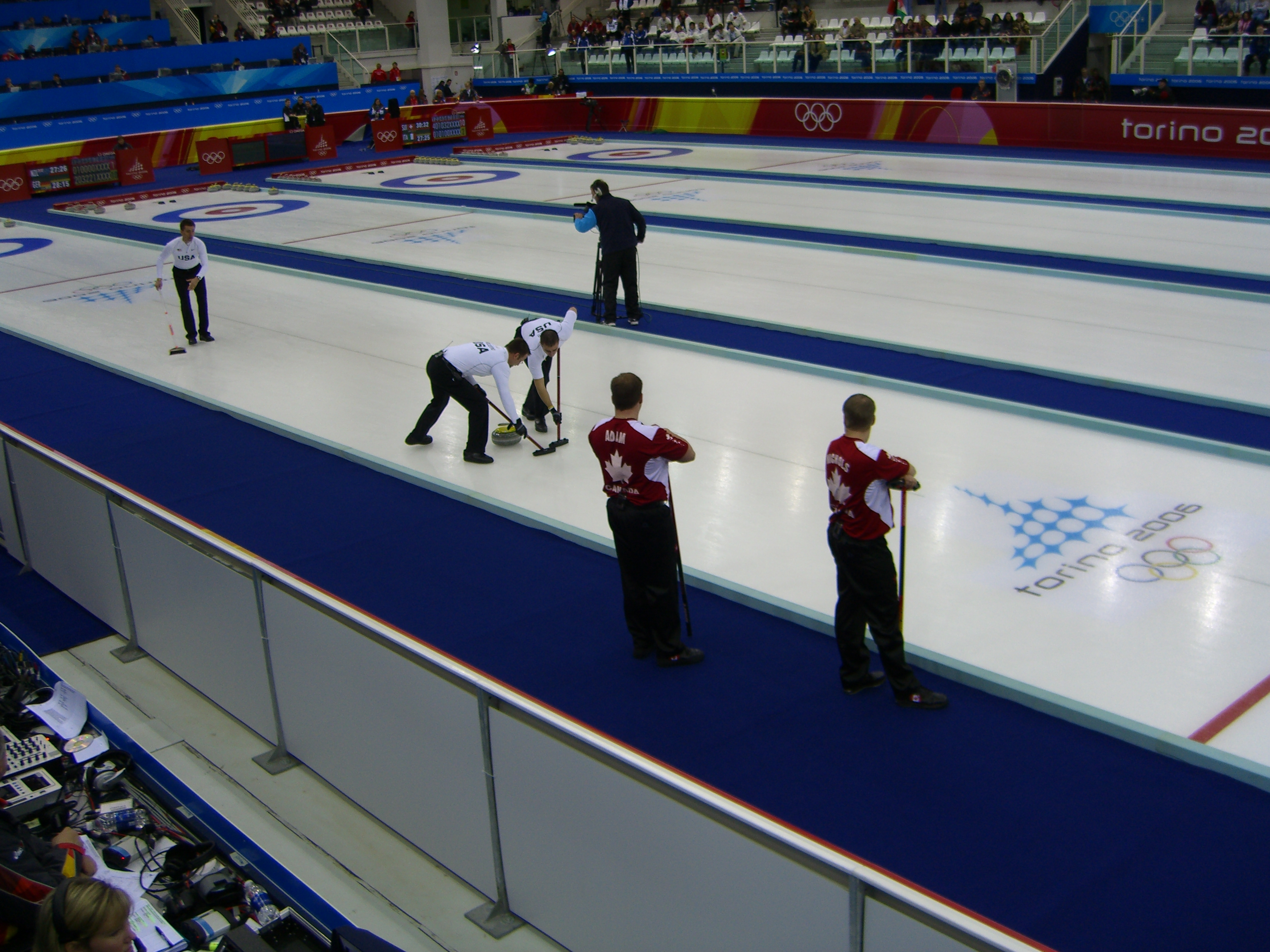
Curling became an official Olympic sport at the 1998 Winter Olympics in Nagano after a 74-year absence.

The list of Olympic sports has changed considerably during the course of Olympic history, and has gradually increased over time. The Olympic Charter decrees that Olympic sports for each edition of the Olympic Games should be decided at an IOC Session no later than seven years prior to the Games.

The only summer sports that have never been absent from the Olympic program are athletics, aquatics (swimming), cycling, fencing, and gymnastics (artistic gymnastics). The only winter sports that were included in all Winter Olympic Games are skiing (Nordic skiing), skating (figure skating and speed skating), and ice hockey. Figure skating and ice hockey were also included in the Summer Olympics (in 1908 and 1920) before the Winter Olympics were introduced in 1924.

Early Olympic Games prior to World War II included eight sports that have since been discontinued from the Olympics: basque pelota, croquet, jeu de paume, polo, rackets, roque, tug of war and water motorsports. Organizers were able to decide which sports or disciplines were included on the program from 1896 to 1920, with the IOC taking control of the program in 1924. As a result, a number of sports were on the Olympic program for relatively brief periods: of the eight discontinued early Olympic sports, the only one on the program after 1920 was polo (in 1924 and 1936). These sports were removed because of lack of interest or the absence of an appropriate governing body. Every other Olympic sport has made at least one appearance since 2020. Several sports that were removed by the IOC have managed to return to the Olympic program after long absences, including archery in 1972, tennis in 1988, curling in 1998, golf and rugby in 2016, and cricket and lacrosse in 2028.

For most of the 20th century, the Olympics included one or more demonstration sports, normally to promote a local sport from the host country or to gauge interest in an entirely new sport. Some such sports, like baseball and taekwondo, were later added to the official Olympic program (in 1992 and 2000, respectively). The competitions and ceremonies in these sports were identical to official Olympic sports, except that the medals were not counted in the official record. On some occasions, both official medal events and demonstration events have been contested in the same sport at the same Games, such as men's and women's judo in 1988. Due to logistical issues, the International Olympic Committee decided in 1989 to eliminate demonstration sports from the Olympic Games after 1992. An unofficial exception was made in 2008, when the Beijing Organizing Committee received permission to organize a wushu tournament.

Women first competed in the 1900 Olympic Games, participating in five sports (croquet, sailing, tennis, golf and equestrian). With the addition of women's boxing in 2012 and women's ski jumping in 2014, women can now compete in all Olympic disciplines except for Greco-Roman wrestling. There is also one women-only discipline, rhythmic gymnastics. In 2024, men were allowed to compete in Olympic artistic swimming for the first time, though no men have yet entered an Olympic competition. Nordic combined, an Olympic discipline from 1924 to 2026, never had women compete.

=== Changes between 2000–2030 ===
The sports of baseball and softball were both voted off the program by the IOC Session in Singapore on 11 July 2005, a decision that was reaffirmed on 9 February 2006. Baseball and softball, before their reinstatement for the 2020 Olympics, were last included in 2008: therefore, the number of sports in the 2012 Summer Olympics was dropped from 28 to 26. This was only the third time after World War II that a sport or discipline had been removed from the Summer Olympic program, following judo after 1964 (returned in 1972) and canoe slalom after 1972 (returned in 1992).

Two previously long-discontinued sports, golf (last competed in 1904) and rugby (last competed in 1924), returned for the 2016 Summer Olympics. On 13 August 2009, the IOC Executive Board proposed that golf and rugby sevens be added to the Olympic program for 2016. On 9 October 2009, during the 121st IOC Session in Copenhagen, the IOC voted to admit both as official Olympic sports and to include them in the 2016 Summer Olympics. The IOC voted 81–8 in favor of rugby sevens and 63–27 in favor of golf, thus bringing the number of sports back to 28.

In February 2013, the IOC considered dropping a sport from the 2020 Summer Olympics to make way for a new sport: modern pentathlon and taekwondo were thought to be vulnerable, but instead the IOC recommended removing wrestling. On 8 September 2013, the decision was reversed and the IOC added wrestling back to the 2020 and 2024 Summer Games.

Starting with the 2020 Games, the IOC altered the way it planned the Olympic sports program: rather than basing it on a maximum number of sports, the total number of events were newly taken into account, opening the schedule up for the inclusion on a per-Games basis of additional sports to the 28 "core" sports. For the 2020 Summer Olympics, the local organizing committee was thus permitted to add five sports to the program in addition to the existing 28, taking the total to 33. Baseball and softball have been treated by the IOC as a single sport since the governing bodies for baseball and softball merged into a single international federation, the World Baseball Softball Confederation, in 2013 (with male athletes competing in baseball and female athletes competing in softball). On 3 August 2016, the IOC voted to add baseball/softball, karate, sport climbing, surfing, and skateboarding as optional sports for the 2020 Summer Olympics.

On 21 February 2019, the Paris 2024 Organizing Committee announced they would propose the inclusion of breakdancing (breaking), as well as skateboarding, sport climbing, and surfing. All four sports were approved during the 134th IOC Session in Lausanne, Switzerland on 24 June 2019.

On 18 June 2021, the IOC issued a proposal for a new winter sport, ski mountaineering, for the 2026 Winter Olympics. The proposal was approved during the IOC's session in Tokyo on 20 July.

On 3 February 2022, the IOC designated skateboarding, sport climbing and surfing to be core Summer Olympic sports starting in 2028, raising the number of core sports to 31. On 16 October 2023, the IOC approved the addition of five optional sports for the 2028 Summer Olympics: baseball/softball, cricket, flag football, lacrosse and squash, while breakdancing was dropped. Cricket's only previous Olympic appearance was in 1900, while lacrosse was last on the Olympic program in 1908.

On 25 June 2026, the IOC approved ski mountaineering as an additional sport for the 2030 Winter Olympics. On 7 July 2026, the IOC added the ski and snowboard discipline of freeride, and removed Nordic combined which had been on the program since the first Winter Olympics in 1924.

=== Changes after 2030 ===
In June 2026, the IOC introduced a "Fit for the Future" methodology for the 2032 Summer Olympics onward, changing the program to be based around disciplines. For each Olympic Games, high-performing candidate disciplines will be evaluated against lower-performing incumbent ones.

== Summer Olympics ==
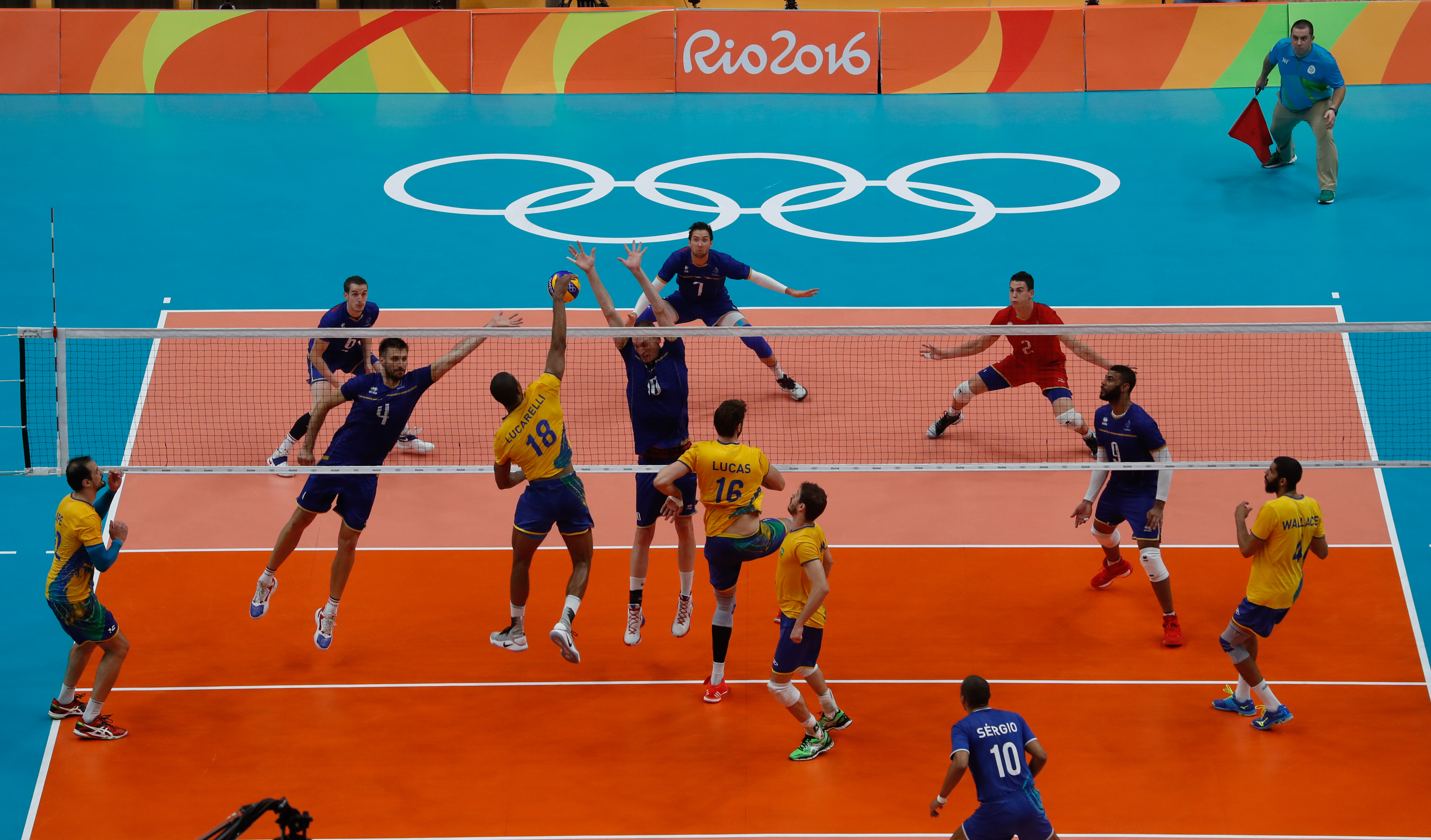
Volleyball has been part of the Summer Olympics since 1964.

At the first Olympic Games, ten sports were contested. Since then, the number of sports contested at the Summer Olympic Games has gradually risen to thirty-six on the program for 2028.

As of 2013, Summer Olympic sports were divided into categories based on popularity, which determined the share each sport's International Federation received of Olympic revenue.

=== Current and discontinued summer program ===
The following sports (and disciplines) make up the current and discontinued Summer Olympic Games official program and are listed alphabetically according to the name used by the IOC. The figures in each cell indicate the number of events for each sport contested at the respective Games; a bullet (•) denotes that the sport was contested as a demonstration or unofficial sport.

Eight of the 32 sports at the 2024 Summer Olympics consist of multiple disciplines. Each discipline is marked with a unique 3-character identifier code by the IOC.

Sport	Discipline	Code & Pictogram	Body	96	00	04	06	08	12	20	24	28	32	36	48	52	56	60	64	68	72	76	80	84	88	92	96	00	04	08	12	16	20	24	28
Aquatics	Artistic swimming	SWA	World Aquatics																					2	2	2	1	2	2	2	2	2	2	2	2
Aquatics	Diving	DIV	World Aquatics			2	1	2	4	5	5	4	4	4	4	4	4	4	4	4	4	4	4	4	4	4	4	8	8	8	8	8	8	8	8
Aquatics	Marathon swimming	OWS	World Aquatics																											2	2	2	2	2	2
Aquatics	Swimming	SWM	World Aquatics	4	7	9	4	6	9	10	11	11	11	11	11	11	13	15	18	29	29	26	26	29	31	31	32	32	32	32	32	32	35	35	41
Aquatics	Water polo	WPO	World Aquatics		1	1		1	1	1	1	1	1	1	1	1	1	1	1	1	1	1	1	1	1	1	1	2	2	2	2	2	2	2	2
Archery		ARC	World Archery		7	6		3		10											2	2	2	2	4	4	4	4	4	4	4	4	5	5	6
Athletics		ATH	World Athletics	12	23	25	21	26	30	29	27	27	29	29	33	33	33	34	36	36	38	37	38	41	42	43	44	46	46	47	47	47	48	48	48
Badminton		BDM	BWF																		•				•	4	5	5	5	5	5	5	5	5	5
Baseball and softball	Baseball	BBL	WBSC (Note: The World Baseball Softball Confederation, which currently governs both baseball and softball, was created by a 2013 merger of two former governing bodies – the International Baseball Federation and the International Softball Federation. Baseball and softball were governed separately at all Olympics before 2013.)		•				•		•			•			•		•					•	•	1	1	1	1	1			1		1
Baseball and softball	Softball	SBL	WBSC																								1	1	1	1			1		1
Basketball	3x3	BK3	FIBA																														2	2	2
Basketball	Basketball	BKB	FIBA			•					•			1	1	1	1	1	1	1	1	2	2	2	2	2	2	2	2	2	2	2	2	2	2
Boxing		BOX	World Boxing (Note: AIBA/IBA was the recognized body of boxing until 2023.)			7		5		8	8	8	8	8	8	10	10	10	10	11	11	11	11	12	12	12	12	12	11	11	13	13	13	13	14
Canoeing	Sprint	CSP	PW								•			9	9	9	9	7	7	7	7	11	11	12	12	12	12	12	12	12	12	12	12	10	10
Canoeing	Slalom	CSL	PW																		4					4	4	4	4	4	4	4	4	6	6
Cricket		CKT	ICC		1																														2
Cycling	BMX freestyle	BMF	UCI																														2	2	2
Cycling	BMX racing	BMX	UCI																											2	2	2	2	2	2
Cycling	Mountain bike	MTB	UCI																								2	2	2	2	2	2	2	2	2
Cycling	Road	CRD	UCI	1			1		2	2	2	2	2	2	2	2	2	2	2	2	2	2	2	3	3	3	4	4	4	4	4	4	4	4	4
Cycling	Track	CTR	UCI	5	3	7	5	7		4	4	4	4	4	4	4	4	4	5	5	5	4	4	5	6	7	8	12	12	10	10	10	12	12	12
Equestrian	Dressage	EDR	FEI						1	1	1	2	2	2	2	2	2	1	2	2	2	2	2	2	2	2	2	2	2	2	2	2	2	2	2
Equestrian	Eventing	EVE	FEI						2	2	2	2	2	2	2	2	2	2	2	2	2	2	2	2	2	2	2	2	2	2	2	2	2	2	2
Equestrian	Jumping	EJP	FEI		3				2	2	2	2	2	2	2	2	2	2	2	2	2	2	2	2	2	2	2	2	2	2	2	2	2	2	2
Fencing		FEN	FIE	3	7	5	8	4	5	6	7	7	7	7	7	7	7	8	8	8	8	8	8	8	8	8	10	10	10	10	10	10	12	12	12
Field hockey		HOC	FIH					1		1		1	1	1	1	1	1	1	1	1	1	1	2	2	2	2	2	2	2	2	2	2	2	2	2
Flag football		FFB	IFAF																																2
Football		FBL	FIFA		1	1	1	1	1	1	1	1		1	1	1	1	1	1	1	1	1	1	1	1	1	2	2	2	2	2	2	2	2	2
Golf		GLF	IGF		2	2																										2	2	2	3
Gymnastics	Artistic	GAR	World Gymnastics	8	1	11	4	2	4	4	9	8	11	9	9	15	15	14	14	14	14	14	14	14	14	14	14	14	14	14	14	14	14	14	15
Gymnastics	Rhythmic	GRY	World Gymnastics																					1	1	1	2	2	2	2	2	2	2	2	2
Gymnastics	Trampoline	GTR	World Gymnastics																									2	2	2	2	2	2	2	2
Handball	Indoor	HBL	IHF																		1	2	2	2	2	2	2	2	2	2	2	2	2	2	2
Judo		JUD	IJF																4		6	6	8	8	7	14	14	14	14	14	14	14	15	15	15
Lacrosse	Sixes	LAC	WL																																2
Modern pentathlon		MPN	UIPM						1	1	1	1	1	1	1	2	2	2	2	2	2	2	2	2	2	2	1	2	2	2	2	2	2	2	2
Rowing	Coastal	RCB	World Rowing																																3
Rowing	Rowing	ROW	World Rowing	0 (Note: Sailing and rowing were included in the program of the 1896 Games, but were cancelled due to bad weather.)	5	5	6	4	4	5	7	7	7	7	7	7	7	7	7	7	7	14	14	14	14	14	14	14	14	14	14	14	14	14	12
Rugby	Sevens	RU7	World Rugby																													2	2	2	2
Sailing		SAL	World Sailing	0	13			4	4	14	3	3	4	4	5	5	5	5	5	5	6	6	6	7	8	10	10	11	11	11	10	10	10	10	10
Shooting		SHO	ISSF	5	8		16	15	18	21	10		2	3	4	7	7	6	6	7	8	7	7	11	13	13	15	17	17	15	15	15	15	15	15
Skateboarding		SKB	World Skate (Note: At the time skateboarding was announced as part of the 2020 Summer Games, the sport was governed by the International Skateboarding Federation. That body merged with Fédération Internationale de Roller Sports in September 2017 to form the current World Skate.)																														4	4	4
Sport climbing		CLB	World Climbing																														2	4	6
Squash		SQU	World Squash																																2
Surfing		SRF	ISA																														2	2	2
Table tennis		TTE	ITTF																						4	4	4	4	4	4	4	4	5	5	6
Taekwondo		TKW	World Taekwondo																						•	•		8	8	8	8	8	8	8	8
Tennis		TEN	World Tennis	2	4	2	4	6	8	5	5									•				•	4	4	4	4	4	4	5	5	5	5	5
Triathlon		TRI	World Triathlon																									2	2	2	2	2	3	3	3
Volleyball	Beach	VBV	FIVB																								2	2	2	2	2	2	2	2	2
Volleyball	Indoor	VVO	FIVB								•								2	2	2	2	2	2	2	2	2	2	2	2	2	2	2	2	2
Weightlifting		WLF	IWF	2		2	2			5	5	5	5	5	6	7	7	7	7	7	9	9	10	10	10	10	10	15	15	15	15	15	14	10	10
Wrestling	Freestyle	WRF	UWW			7		5		5	7	7	7	7	8	8	8	8	8	8	10	10	10	10	10	10	10	8	11	11	11	12	12	12	12
Wrestling	Greco-Roman	WRG	UWW	1			4	4	5	5	6	6	7	7	8	8	8	8	8	8	10	10	10	10	10	10	10	8	7	7	7	6	6	6	6
Basque Pelota		PEL	FIPV		1						•									•						•									
Breaking		BKG	WDSF																															2	
Croquet		CQT	WCF		3																														
Equestrian	Driving	EDV	FEI		2																														
Equestrian	Vaulting	EVL	FEI							2																									
Handball	Field	HBL	IHF											1		•																			
Jeu de paume		–	–					1																											
Karate		KTE	WKF																														8		
Lacrosse	Field	LAC	WL			1		1				•	•		•																				
Polo		POL	FIP		1			1		1	1			1																					
Rackets		RQT	–					2																											
Roque		–	–			1																													
Rugby	Union	RUG	World Rugby		1			1		1	1																								
Tug of war		TOW	TWIF		1	1	1	1	1	1																									
Water motorsports		PBT	UIM		•			3																											
Skating	Figure	FSK	ISU					4		3	Included in winter games (see below)																								
Ice hockey		IHO	IIHF							1	Included in winter games (see below)																								
Total events				43	95	95	78	110	102	156	126	109	117	129	136	149	151	150	163	172	195	198	203	221	237	257	271	300	301	302	302	306	339	329	353
Total disciplines				10	21	18	14	25	18	29	23	20	20	25	23	23	23	23	25	24	28	27	27	29	31	34	37	40	40	42	40	42	50	48	54

=== Feats and artistic events ===
Art competitions were held between the 1912 and 1948 Games, with medals awarded. The IOC classifies art competitions as non-sport competitions, separate from the Olympic sports programme. In 1952, art competition medals were removed from the official national medal counts. Only since 2021 have they been officially listed again by the IOC in the medal tables and respective National Olympic Committee (NOC) profiles on its website.

Olympic gold medals have also been awarded for feats of alpinism and aeronautics. Three gold medals in alpinism (for the 1922 British Mount Everest expedition, the first ascent of the northern wall of the Matterhorn in 1931, and for the Himalaya expeditions of 1930 and 1934 combined) and one gold medal in aeronautics (for the first crossing of the Alps by a glider in 1935). The contemporary Olympia-Zeitung, the official journal from the 1936 Berlin Games, shows that these awards in 1936—final time such awards were offered—like art competition medals, were not included in the national medal count, unlike in the current IOC database for the medal tables of the Games in question.

- Aeronautics (1936)
- Alpinism (1924 w, 1932, 1936)
- Art competitions (1912–1948)

=== Demonstration summer sports ===
Between 1924 and 1992, the IOC officially recognized demonstration sports, allowing host countries to organize demonstrations of non-Olympic sports during the Games; no demonstration sports were held in 1976 or 1980 due to the IOC temporarily eliminating them.

The following sports or disciplines have been demonstration sports at the Summer Olympic Games for the years shown, but have never been included on the Olympic program as a medal event.

- American football (1932)
- Australian football (1956)
- Budō (1964)
- Gliding (1936)
- Korfball (1928)
- La canne (1924)
- Pesäpallo (1952)
- Roller hockey (1992)
- Savate (1924)
- Swedish (Ling) gymnastics (1948)
- Water skiing (1972)

American football (1904) and Korfball (1920) first appeared as unofficial sports before becoming demonstration sports.

Gliding was promoted from a demonstration sport to an official Olympic sport for the 1940 Summer Olympics, but the Games were cancelled due to World War II. Flag football, a non-contact version of American football, will make its Olympic debut in 2028.

=== Unofficial summer sports ===
Several sports, while not officially recognized by the IOC as demonstration sports, have nonetheless been held alongside or as part of the Olympic program. Events held during Games prior to 1924 are considered demonstration sports by some scholars, though not by the IOC. Bowling at the 1988 Games (along with badminton) was considered an exhibition sport in that it was not part of the official Olympic schedule and did not require IOC approval for staging, unlike demonstration sports.

Organizers of the 1900 and 1904 Olympic Games, which were staged in conjunction with the 1900 and 1904 World's Fairs, included numerous sporting events on an equal footing under their programmes. Historians generally regard many of these as not satisfying retrospective inclusion criteria to qualify as "official". Through 1995, the IOC never made a determination regarding which events were Olympic and which were not, although the present IOC website generally conforms to historians' views.

- Angling (1900)
- Ballooning (1900)
- Boules (1900)
- Bowling (1988)
- Cannon shooting (1900)
- Chess (2000)
- Cycle polo (1908)
- Fire fighting (1900)
- Gaelic football (1904)
- Glima (1908, 1912)
- Gotland sports (1912)
- Hurling (1904)
- Indian sports (1936)
- Kaatsen (1928)
- Kite flying (1900)
- Life saving (1900)
- Longue paume (1900)
- Military exercise (1900)
- Motor racing (1900, 1936)
- Motorcycle racing (1900)
- Pigeon racing (1900)
- Pistol dueling (1906, 1908)
- Wheelchair racing (1984–2004)
- Wushu (1936, 2008)

== Winter Olympics ==
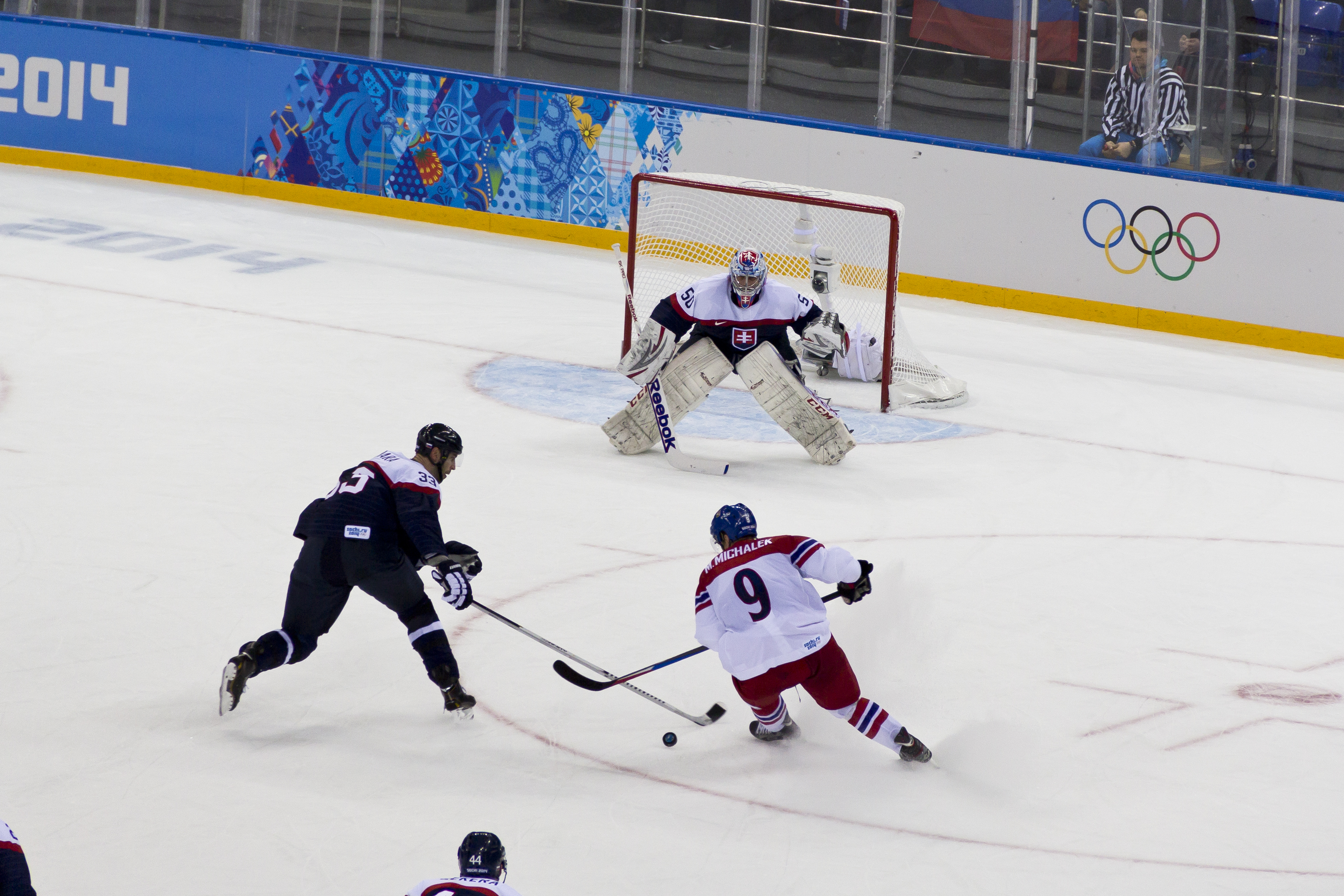
Ice hockey was introduced at the 1920 Summer Olympics and then moved to the Winter Games in 1924.

Before 1924, ice sports like figure skating and ice hockey were held at the Summer Olympic Games. These two sports made their debuts at the 1908 and the 1920 Summer Olympics respectively, but in 1924 they were moved to the first edition of the Winter Olympic Games and became permanent fixtures on the sports program for the Winter Olympics from then on.

The 1924 International Winter Sports Week, later dubbed the first Olympic Winter Games and retroactively recognized as such by the IOC, consisted of nine disciplines in six sports.

A sport or discipline must be practised on snow or ice to be eligible for inclusion on the Olympic program for the Winter Games.

=== Current and discontinued winter program ===
The following sports (and disciplines) make up the current Winter Olympic Games official program and are listed alphabetically, according to the name used by the IOC. The figures in each cell indicate the number of events for each sport that were contested at the respective Games (the red cells indicate that those sports were held at the Summer Games); a bullet (•) denotes that the sport was contested as a demonstration or unofficial sport.

Four out of the eight sports consist of multiple disciplines.

Sport	Discipline	Code & Pictogram	Body	08	20	24	28	32	36	48	52	56	60	64	68	72	76	80	84	88	92	94	98	02	06	10	14	18	22	26	30
Biathlon		BTH	IBU										1	1	2	2	2	3	3	3	6	6	6	8	10	10	11	11	11	11	12
Bobsleigh	Bobsleigh	BOB	IBSF			1	1	2	2	2	2	2		2	2	2	2	2	2	2	2	2	2	3	3	3	3	3	4	4	4
Bobsleigh	Skeleton	SKN	IBSF				1			1														2	2	2	2	2	2	3	3
Curling		CUR	World Curling			1		•												•	•		2	2	2	2	2	3	3	3	3
Ice hockey		IHO	IIHF		1 (Note: Figure skating and ice hockey were featured as part of the Summer Olympics program before the Winter Olympics were inaugurated in 1924.)	1	1	1	1	1	1	1	1	1	1	1	1	1	1	1	1	1	2	2	2	2	2	2	2	2	2
Luge		LUG	FIL											3	3	3	3	3	3	3	3	3	3	3	3	3	4	4	4	5	5
Skating	Figure skating	FSK	ISU	4	3	3	3	3	3	3	3	3	3	3	3	3	4	4	4	4	4	4	4	4	4	4	5	5	5	5	6
Skating	Short track speed skating	STK	ISU																	•	4	6	6	8	8	8	8	8	9	9	9
Skating	Speed skating	SSK	ISU			5	4	4	4	4	4	4	8	8	8	8	9	9	9	10	10	10	10	10	12	12	12	14	14	14	16
Ski and snowboard	Alpine skiing	ALP	FIS						2	6	6	6	6	6	6	6	6	6	6	10	10	10	10	10	10	10	10	11	11	10	10
Ski and snowboard	Cross-country skiing	CCS	FIS			2	2	2	3	3	4	6	6	7	7	7	7	7	8	8	10	10	10	12	12	12	12	12	12	12	12
Ski and snowboard	Freeride		FIS																												4
Ski and snowboard	Freestyle skiing	FRS	FIS																	•	2	4	4	4	4	6	10	10	13	15	16
Ski and snowboard	Ski jumping	SJP	FIS			1	1	1	1	1	1	1	1	2	2	2	2	2	2	3	3	3	3	3	3	3	4	4	5	6	7
Ski and snowboard	Snowboard	SBD	FIS																				4	4	6	6	10	10	11	11	12
Ski mountaineering	Individual		ISMF																												2
Ski mountaineering	Sprint	SMT	ISMF																											3	3
Military patrol (Note: Military patrol is considered to be the precursor to biathlon; however, the Official Report of the 1924 Games regards it as an event within the sport of skiing. The official website of the IOC lists military patrol as a standalone discipline without specifying if it is part of either sport.)		–	–			1	•		•	•																					
Ski and snowboard	Nordic combined	NCB	FIS			1	1	1	1	1	1	1	1	1	1	1	1	1	1	2	2	2	2	3	3	3	3	3	3	3	
Total events						16	14	14	17	22	22	24	27	34	35	35	37	38	39	46	57	61	68	78	84	86	98	102	109	116	126
Total disciplines						9	8	7	8	9	8	8	8	10	10	10	10	10	10	10	12	12	14	15	15	15	15	15	15	16	17

=== Demonstration winter sports ===
The following sports or disciplines have been demonstration sports at the Winter Olympic Games for the years shown, but have never been included on the Olympic program as a medal event.

- Bandy (1952)
- Ice stock sport (1936, 1964)
- Skijoring (1928)
- Sled-dog racing (1932)
- Speed skiing (1992)
- Winter pentathlon (1948)

Ski ballet, an event within freestyle skiing, has only appeared on the demonstration program in 1988 and 1992.

=== Unofficial winter sports ===
- Disabled skiing (1984, 1988)

== Sports frequency ==
Olympic sports by frequency (as of 2026)
Sport	Discipline	Number of times officially held (at Summer or Winter Olympics)	Number of medal events
Aquatics	Artistic Swimming	11	21
Aquatics	Diving	29	139
Aquatics	Marathon swimming	5	10
Aquatics	Swimming	31	624
Aquatics	Water polo	29	36
Archery		18	76
Athletics		31	1095
Badminton		9	44
Basketball	3x3	2	4
Basketball	Basketball	23	34
Boxing		27	278
Breaking		1	2
Canoeing	Sprint	21	216
Canoeing	Slalom	10	42
Cycling	BMX freestyle	2	4
Cycling	BMX racing	5	10
Cycling	Mountain bike	8	16
Cycling	Road	28	73
Cycling	Track	30	190
Equestrian	Dressage	26	48
Equestrian	Driving	1	2
Equestrian	Eventing	26	52
Equestrian	Jumping	27	55
Equestrian	Vaulting	1	2
Fencing		31	243
Field hockey		25	37
Football		29	37
Golf		5	10
Gymnastics	Artistic	31	348
Gymnastics	Rhythmic	11	19
Gymnastics	Trampoline	7	14
Handball	Field	1	1
Handball	Indoor	14	27
Judo		15	167
Modern pentathlon		26	44
Rowing		30 (Note: Rowing and sailing were also included in the programme of the 1896 Games, but were cancelled due to bad weather.)	281
Rugby	Sevens	3	6
Rugby	Union	4	4
Sailing		29 (Note: Rowing and sailing were also included in the programme of the 1896 Games, but were cancelled due to bad weather.)	205
Shooting		29	318
Skateboarding		2	8
Sport climbing		2	6
Surfing		2	4
Table tennis		10	42
Taekwondo		7	56
Tennis		17	76
Triathlon		7	16
Volleyball	Beach	9	16
Volleyball	Indoor	16	32
Weightlifting		28	239
Wrestling	Freestyle	27	240
Wrestling	Greco-Roman	29	210
Baseball and softball	Baseball	6	6
Baseball and softball	Softball	5	5
Basque pelota		1	1
Cricket		1	1
Croquet		1	3
Jeu de paume		1	1
Karate		1	8
Lacrosse		2	2
Polo		5	5
Rackets		1	2
Roque		1	1
Tug of war		6	6
Water motorsports		2	3
Biathlon		18	107
Bobsleigh	Bobsleigh	24	55
Bobsleigh	Skeleton	9	17
Curling		9	20
Ice hockey		26	34
Luge		17	54
Skating	Figure	27	100
Skating	Short track speed	10	74
Skating	Speed	25	216
Ski and snowboard	Alpine skiing	22	175
Ski and snowboard	Cross-country skiing	25	193
Ski and snowboard	Freestyle skiing	10	72
Ski and snowboard	Nordic combined	25	43
Ski and snowboard	Ski jumping	25	60
Ski and snowboard	Snowboard	8	62
Ski mountaineering		1	3
Military patrol		1	1

== Recognized international federations ==
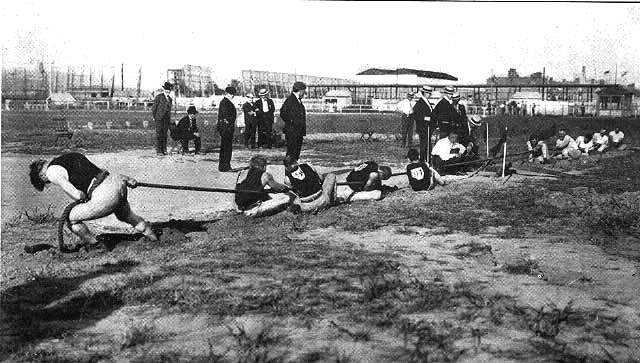
Tug of war was contested at the 1904 Summer Olympics. It was later dropped from the Olympic program but remains a recognized sport.

Many sports have their governing bodies recognized by the IOC, but are not contested at the Olympics.

Such sports, if eligible under the terms of the Olympic Charter, may apply for inclusion in the program at future Games, through a recommendation by the IOC Olympic Programme Commission, followed by a decision of the IOC Executive Board and a vote of the IOC Session. When Olympic demonstration sports took place, a sport usually appeared as such before being officially admitted.

An International Sport Federation (IF) is responsible for ensuring that the sport's activities follow the Olympic Charter. When a sport is recognized by the IOC, the IF becomes an official Olympic sport federation and joins either the Association of Summer Olympic International Federations (ASOIF, for summer Olympic sports), the Association of International Olympic Winter Sports Federations (AIOWF, for winter Olympic sports), or the Association of IOC Recognised International Sports Federations (ARISF, for non-Olympic sports).

A number of recognized sports are included in the program of the World Games, a multi-sport event run by the International World Games Association, an organization that operates under the patronage of the IOC. Since the start of the World Games in 1981, 16 sports and disciplines that have been competed there – badminton and baseball (1992), beach volleyball and softball (1996), taekwondo, trampoline, triathlon, women's water polo and women's weightlifting (2000), rugby sevens (2016), karate and sport climbing (2020), breakdancing (2024), and flag football, lacrosse sixes and squash (2028) – have subsequently been added to the Olympic program.

The governing bodies of the following sports currently not contested at the Olympic Games are recognized by the IOC:

- Air sports^{1}
- Auto racing
- Bandy
- Billiard sports^{1}
- Boules^{1}
- Bowling
- Bridge
- Cheerleading^{1}
- Chess
- Dancesport^{1,2}
- Floorball^{1}
- Flying disc^{1}
- Ice stock sport
- Karate^{1,2}
- Kickboxing^{1}
- Korfball^{1}
- Lifesaving^{1}
- Motorcycle racing
- Mountaineering and climbing
- Muaythai^{1}
- Netball
- Orienteering^{1}
- Pelota vasca^{2}
- Polo^{2}
- Powerboating^{1,2}
- Racquetball^{1}
- Sambo
- Sumo
- Tug of war^{1,2}
- Underwater sports^{1}
- Water skiing and wakeboarding^{1,3}
- Wushu^{1}

^{1} Official sport at the World Games.
^{2} Discontinued Olympic sport.
^{3} Water skiing and wakeboarding share the same governing body.

A sport can be contested at the Olympics even if most of its disciplines are not. For example, roller sports (governed by World Skate) are represented at the Olympics by skateboarding, but other disciplines such as inline skating or roller skating have not yet been added.

In addition, though not a sporting federation, the International Paralympic Committee, which hosts the annual Paralympic Games following the Olympics, is recognized by the IOC.

== See also ==
- Association of Summer Olympic International Federations
- Association of International Olympic Winter Sports Federations
- Association of IOC Recognised International Sports Federations
- List of International Olympic Committee competitions
