= List of Olympic venues in demonstration events =

For the Olympic Games until the 1992 Summer Olympics in Barcelona and 1992 Winter Olympics in Albertville, there have been demonstration or exhibition events that have occurred on various sports. Some of these sports later became Olympic sports such as basketball, canoeing, and short track speed skating. These are a list of other venues that hosted demonstration sports that did not become nor had never been official Olympic sports.

== Summer Olympics ==
Games	Sport	Venue	Other sports hosted at venue during those games	Capacity	Ref.
1912 Stockholm	Glima	Olympic Stadium	Athletics, Equestrian, Football, Gymnastics, Modern pentathlon (running), Tug of War, Wrestling	Not listed	
1920 Antwerp	Korfball	Olympic Stadium	Athletics, Equestrian, Field hockey, Football, Gymnastics, Modern pentathlon, Rugby union, Tug of war, Weightlifting	30,000	
1928 Amsterdam	Kaatsen	Olympic Stadium	Athletics, Cycling, (track), Equestrian, (jumping), Football, Gymnastics	33,025	
1928 Amsterdam	Korfball	Olympic Stadium	Athletics, Cycling, (track), Equestrian, (jumping), Football, Gymnastics	33,025	
1932 Los Angeles	American football	Los Angeles Memorial Coliseum	None	60,000	
1952 Helsinki	Pesäpallo	Helsinki Olympic Stadium	Athletics, Equestrian (jumping), Football (finale)	19,309	
1956 Melbourne	Australian rules football	Melbourne Cricket Ground	Athletics, Field hockey (final)	104,000	
1964 Tokyo	Budo	Nippon Budokan	Judo	Not listed	
1972 Munich	Water skiing	Kieler Förde	None	Not listed	
1988 Seoul	Bowling	Royal Bowling Center	None	Not listed	
1992 Barcelona	Roller hockey	Palau Blaugrana	Judo, Taekwondo (demonstration)	6,400	
1992 Barcelona	Roller hockey	Pavelló de l'Ateneu de Sant Sadurní	None	1,300	
1992 Barcelona	Roller hockey	Pavelló del Club Patí Vic	None	1,700	
1992 Barcelona	Roller hockey	Pavelló d'Esports de Reus	None	3,000	
1924	Savate				
1924	La canne				
1936	Gliding				
1948	Swedish (Ling) gymnastics				

== Winter Olympics ==
Games	Venue	Sport	Other sports hosted at venue for those games	Capacity	Ref.
1952 Oslo	Bislett stadion	Bandy	Figure skating, Speed skating	29,000	
1952 Oslo	Dæhlenenga	Bandy	Ice hockey	Not listed	
1992 Albertville	Les Arcs	Speed skiing	None	Not listed	
1928		Skijoring			
1932		Sled-dog racing			
1936		Ice stock sport			
1964		Ice stock sport			
1948		Winter pentathlon			
1984		Disabled skiing			
1988		Disabled skiing			
1988		Ski ballet (acroski)			
1992		Ski ballet (acroski)			
