= Basque pelota at the Summer Olympics =

- IOC Code: PEL
- Governing body: FIPV
- Events: 10 (men: 9; women: 1)

Summer Olympics
- 1896; 1900; 1904; 1908; 1912; 1920; 1924; 1928; 1932; 1936; 1948; 1952; 1956; 1960; 1964; 1968; 1972; 1976; 1980; 1984; 1988; 1992; 1996; 2000; 2004; 2008; 2012; 2016; 2020; 2024; 2028; 2032; Note: demonstration or exhibition sport years indicated in italics
- Medalists

Basque pelota was featured at the Summer Olympics at the 1900 Games. It was contested in another three Olympics as a demonstration sport: 1924, 1968 and 1992.

Basque pelota is the only Olympic sport that has effectively never been played at the Games. The 1900 tournament featured one match but the French team withdrew, giving Spain the gold medal by default.

In 2011, the International Federation of Basque Pelota proposed Basque pelota for the 2020 Olympic Games in the event that Madrid would win the candidacy, which it did not.

== Medal table ==
Accurate as of the conclusion of the 1900 Olympics.

Rank	Nation	Gold	Silver	Bronze	Total
1	Spain	1	0	0	1
Totals (1 entries)		1	0	0	1
