= Pro Skijor =

Professional skijoring competition series

Pro Skijor is an American professional skijoring competition series. It developed from Skijoring Utah which was founded in 2017 by Brian Gardner and Joe Loveridge. The first event was held at Soldier Hollow in Midway, Utah. The organization later became PRO Skijor. PRO Skijor launched the Frontier Tour in 2026, expanding competition across multiple western states.

== History ==
Brian Gardner and Joe Loveridge organized Skijoring Utah after becoming interested in bringing skijoring to Utah. The first Skijoring Utah event was held at Soldier Hollow in Midway, Wasatch County, Utah in 2017. The inaugural competition had approximately 100 competitors and 500 spectators. The event subsequently became an annual Utah skijoring competition.

In 2022, Condé Nast Traveler covered Skijoring Utah in a feature about the sport of skijoring. The writer participated in the competition and described the event, course and experience.

In 2025, the organizers announced that Skijoring Utah was expanding into PRO Skijor. The expansion created the Frontier Tour, a professional multi-event skijoring circuit. The inaugural tour was scheduled with multiple tour stops across Utah, Montana and Idaho.

== Competition format ==
A skijoring team consists of a horse, rider and skier or snowboarder. Skijoring events include multiple divisions across multiple skill levels. The horse and rider travel down the course while pulling the skier/snowboarder by a tow rope. Competitors race against the clock. Courses can include gates, rings and jumps. Missing course elements can result in time penalties. The objective is to complete the course successfully in the fastest adjusted time.

== Frontier Tour ==
The inaugural Frontier Tour began in January 2026. The opening event was held in Heber City, Utah at the Wasatch County Events Complex. The tour operated as a multi-event circuit with stops in Utah, Montana and Idaho. Competitors accumulated tour points over the season toward a tour championship. The inaugural season concluded with the championship finals in Utah in March 2026.
