= Korfball at the Summer Olympics =

- IOC Code: KBL
- Governing body: IKF
- Events: 1 (mixed)

Summer Olympics
- 1896; 1900; 1904; 1908; 1912; 1920; 1924; 1928; 1932; 1936; 1948; 1952; 1956; 1960; 1964; 1968; 1972; 1976; 1980; 1984; 1988; 1992; 1996; 2000; 2004; 2008; 2012; 2016; 2020; 2024; 2028; 2032; Note: demonstration or exhibition sport years indicated in italics
- Medalists

Korfball was featured in the Summer Olympic Games demonstration programme in 1920 and 1928.
