= Basque pelota at the 1992 Summer Olympics =

Promotional poster for the Basque pelota event.

Basque Pelota was a demonstration sport at the 1992 Summer Olympics in Barcelona. It was the fourth and last time that the sport was included in the Olympic program; it was an official Olympic sport at the 1900 Games in Paris, and a demonstration sport in 1924 and 1968.

The Basque Pelota events were held from 25 July to 5 August in the Olympic area of Vall d'Hebron, where a 54m long court, a 36m long court, and a trinquet were built and a 30m long court was refurbished. In each modality, the participants were the four best classified countries at the World Championships held in Cuba in 1990. However, the United States renounced to participate and had to be replaced by the team that had finished in fifth place when necessary.

== Events ==
| Event | Gold | Silver | Bronze |
|---|---|---|---|
| Basket-pelota (54m) | Konpa, Atain, Celaya, Oianguren; Spain | Bordes, Etcheberry, Etchalus, Abadoberry; France | Valdes Brothers, Ugartechea; Mexico |
| Frontenis, Men's (30m) | Salazar Brothers; Mexico | Gonzalez, Anduiza; Cuba | Velasco, Fite, Font, Roig; Spain |
| Frontenis, Women's (30m) | Rosa María Flores / Miriam Muñoz; Mexico | Navarrete, Palacios, Ortiz, Martinez; Spain | Martha Domínguez / Haymed Valdés; Cuba |
| Hand-pelota doubles (Trinquet) | Saldaña Brothers, Santamaria, Zea; Mexico | Goñi, Larrañaga, Choperena, Ruiz; Spain | Muscarditz, Cotabarren, Sallaberry, Falxa; France |
| Paleta-leather (Trinquet) | Elortondo, Abadia, Bizzozero; Argentina | Mendiluce, Altadill, Ubanell, Egaña; Spain | Arenas, Cambos, Cazemayor, Petrissans; France |
| Paleta-rubber (Trinquet) | Ross Brothers, Romano, Miró; Argentina | Lissar, Lasalle, Amadoz; France | Irizar, Pagoaga, Sagarzazu, Eguinoa; Spain |
| Hand-pelota singles (36m) | Beloki, Baceta; Spain | Hirigoyen, Muguida; France | Quesada, López Carrillo; Cuba |
| Hand-pelota doubles (36m) | Lujambio, Balerdi, Balanza, Fernández; Spain | Juzan, Mutuberria, Bergara, Espil; France | Vera, Olivos, Izquierdo; Mexico |
| Paleta-leather (36m) | Insausti, Juan Pablo, Tejada, Huros; Spain | Iniestra, Musi, Aguirre, Mercadillo; Mexico | Filippo, Huete, Canut, Elortondo; Argentina |
| Short bat (36m) | Daniel, Gárrido, Hernández, Araujo; Spain | Iniestra, Musi, Medina; Mexico | González R., González V. Cuba |

== Participating nations ==
8 nations competed.

- Argentina
- Cuba
- France
- Mexico

- Philippines
- Spain
- Uruguay
- Venezuela

== Medal table ==
| Rank | Nation | Gold | Silver | Bronze | Total |
|---|---|---|---|---|---|
| 1 | Spain | 5 | 3 | 2 | 10 |
| 2 | Mexico | 3 | 2 | 2 | 7 |
| 3 | Argentina | 2 | 0 | 1 | 3 |
| 4 | France | 0 | 4 | 2 | 6 |
| 5 | Cuba | 0 | 1 | 3 | 4 |
| Totals (5 entries) | | 10 | 10 | 10 | 30 |

Note: Since Basque Pelota was a demonstration sport, medals were awarded, but the medals were not "official" (and did not count in the respective nations' medal totals).
