= Basque pelota at the 1968 Summer Olympics =

Basque Pelota was a demonstration sport at the 1968 Summer Olympics in Mexico City. It was the third time that the sport was included in the Olympic program; it was an official Olympic sport at the 1900 Games in Paris, and a demonstration sport in 1924. It would be included as a demonstration sport once again at the 1992 Games in Barcelona.

== Events ==
Event	Gold	Silver	Bronze
Basket-pelota	Mirapeix Brothers, Beascoechea, Arrien; Spain	Etcheverry, Camy, Borra, Fourneau; France	Hamui Brothers, Andrade, Lanzagorta; Mexico
Paleta-rubber	Becerra, Rendon, Gastelumendi, Baltazar; Mexico	Sehter, Utge, Goyeche, Caresella; Argentina	Iroldi, D'Alba, Bell; Uruguay
Paleta-leather	Bareilts Brothers, Berrotaran, Goicoechea; France	Ancizu, Caballero, Reyzabal, Casado; Spain	Sanchez, Beltran, Del Valle; Mexico
Frontenis	Loaiza, Hernandez, Sanciprian; Mexico	Sehter, Utge; Argentina	Garraus, Lersundi, Irigaray; Spain
Hand-pelota	Esquisabel, Basabe, Sacristan, Iruzubieta; Spain	Arrillaga, Minondo, Lissar, Etchegoin; France	Hernández, Tovar, Rivero, Izquierdo; Mexico

== Medal table ==
Rank	Nation	Gold	Silver	Bronze	Total
1	Spain	2	1	1	4
2	Mexico	2	0	3	5
3	France	1	2	0	3
4	Argentina	0	2	0	2
5	Uruguay	0	0	1	1
Totals (5 entries)		5	5	5	15

Note: Since Basque Pelota was a demonstration sport, medals were awarded, but the medals were not "official" (and did not count in the respective nations' medal totals).
