= Motor racing at the Summer Olympics =

- IOC Code: AUT
- Governing body: FIA
- Events: 16 (men: 15; mixed: 1)

Summer Olympics
- 1896; 1900; 1904; 1908; 1912; 1920; 1924; 1928; 1932; 1936; 1948; 1952; 1956; 1960; 1964; 1968; 1972; 1976; 1980; 1984; 1988; 1992; 1996; 2000; 2004; 2008; 2012; 2016; 2020; 2024; 2028; 2032; Note: demonstration or exhibition sport years indicated in italics
- Medalists

Motor racing has been featured at the Summer Olympics twice, though neither time as a full medal event. In 1900, it was a sport at the 1900 World's Fair like all other Olympic events, but has generally not been considered official. In 1936, an unofficial "Olympic Rally" was held, with prizes awarded.
