= Basketball at the 1924 Summer Olympics =

Basketball was played as an unofficial exhibition event at the 1924 Summer Olympics as part of the Jeux de L’Enfance, an accompanying youth sports competition. Teams represented different cities and clubs in France, as well as overseas YMCA chapters.

Basketball was not recognized by the International Olympic Committee as an official demonstration sport in 1924, though the matches were included in the Official Report of the Games.

A women's basketball exhibition tournament was also held alongside the Games, and was won by the Edmonton Grads, a feat which they repeated in the next three Olympics. However, this tournament and the three subsequent were organized parallel to the Olympics by the International Women's Sports Federation, so were technically not Olympic exhibition events.
