= Volleyball at the 1924 Summer Olympics =

Volleyball was played as an unofficial exhibition event at the 1924 Summer Olympics as part of the Jeux de L’Enfance, an accompanying youth sports competition. Teams represented different cities and clubs in France (one team represented the École Militaire de Paris) as well as overseas YMCA chapters. There were two international matches between French and American selection teams.

1924 was the first time volleyball had featured at the Olympic Games in any form. Volleyball was not recognized by the International Olympic Committee as an official demonstration sport in 1924, though the matches were included in the Official Report of the Games.
