= Baseball at the 1924 Summer Olympics =

An unofficial exhibition baseball game was played at the 1924 Summer Olympics on July 18, 1924 with an American club team beating the Ranelagh Club of France 5–0 in a game which didn't go beyond three or four innings due to poor field conditions. The pitcher for the United States team was named Kilmer and was from Yonkers, New York.

The match was considered part of the Jeux de L’Enfance, a youth sports competition accompanying the 1924 Olympics. Baseball was not recognized by the International Olympic Committee as an official demonstration sport in 1924, though the match was included in the Official Report of the Games.
