= Motor racing at the 1936 Summer Olympics =

Motor racing was held as an unofficial exhibition event, the "Olympic Rally", alongside the 1936 Summer Olympics.

== Event ==
Little is known about the competition, though gold medals are known to have been awarded to Betty Haig of Great Britain (and her co-driver, either Joyce Lambert or Barbara Marshall) in a Singer Le Mans, as well as Paul Abt of Switzerland in a Riley Falcon.

According to the official rules and regulations document, points were awarded for crossing certain checkpoints, with all racers who surpassed 2,000 points being awarded a gold medal, 1,000 points getting a silver, and all others who completed the course getting a bronze.

Some sources claim that Fritz Huschke von Hanstein of Germany was awarded a silver trophy.
