= Skijoring =

Winter sport involving being pulled on skis

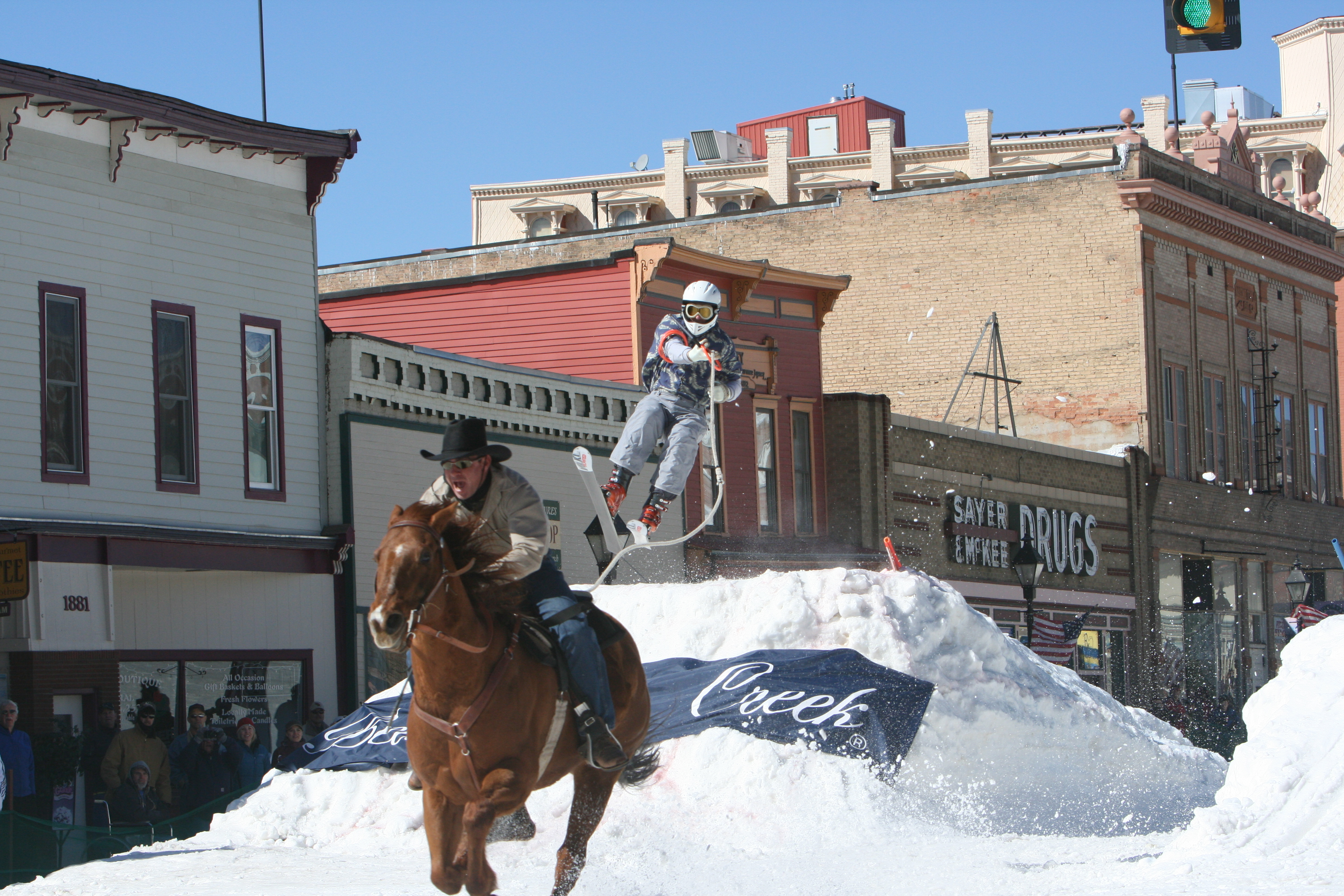
- Skijor racing with horses

Characteristics
- Mixed-sex: Yes
- Type: Outdoor
- Equipment: winter skiis; animal equipment; towing equipment
- Venue: dog sports; equestrian sport

Presence
- Olympic: Exhibition 1928
- Paralympic: No
- World Games: No

Skijoring (pronounced /ˌskiːˈdʒɔːrɪŋ/) is a winter sport in which a person on skis is pulled by a horse, a dog (or dogs), another animal, or a motor vehicle. The name is derived from the Norwegian word skikjøring, meaning "ski driving". Although skijoring is said to have originated as a mode of winter travel, it is currently primarily a competitive sport.

== History ==
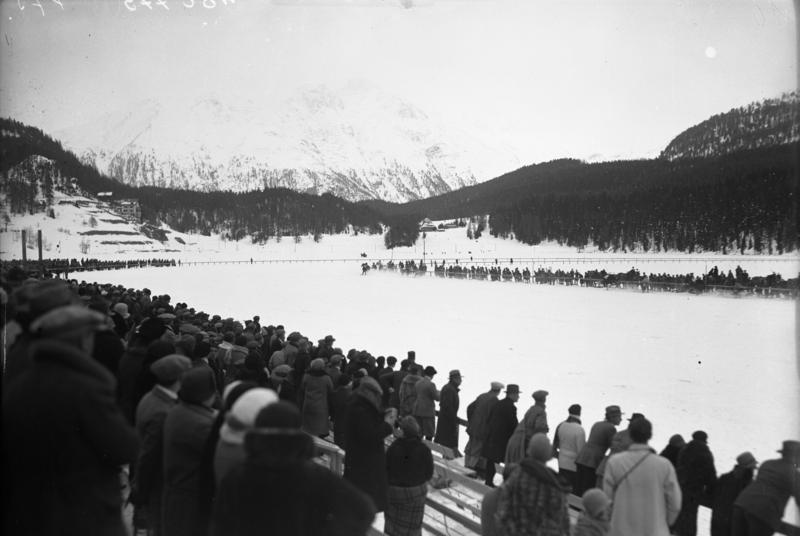
Demonstration skijoring competition at the 1928 Winter Olympics. Horses are seen in the distance, coming around the bend of the track.

For hundreds of years, Sami people harnessed reindeer and strapped on Nordic skis as a way to travel across vast snowy expanses. Skijoring behind reindeer made its official debut in Stockholm at the Nordic Games of 1901, 1905 and 1909. Skijoring is still done in some Scandinavian countries. Reindeer races are still held in Tromsø, Norway; Jokkmokk, Sweden; Inari, Finland; and Nadym, Russia. By 1912, skijoring behind horses was a popular activity in Switzerland and France.

Equine skijoring found its way from Europe to North America. In 1915, it appeared as a recreational activity in Lake Placid, New York, and beginning in 1916 was a regular pastime at the Dartmouth Winter Carnival in Hanover, New Hampshire.

In 1928, equine skijoring made an appearance as an exhibition sport at the Winter Olympics in St. Moritz, Switzerland.

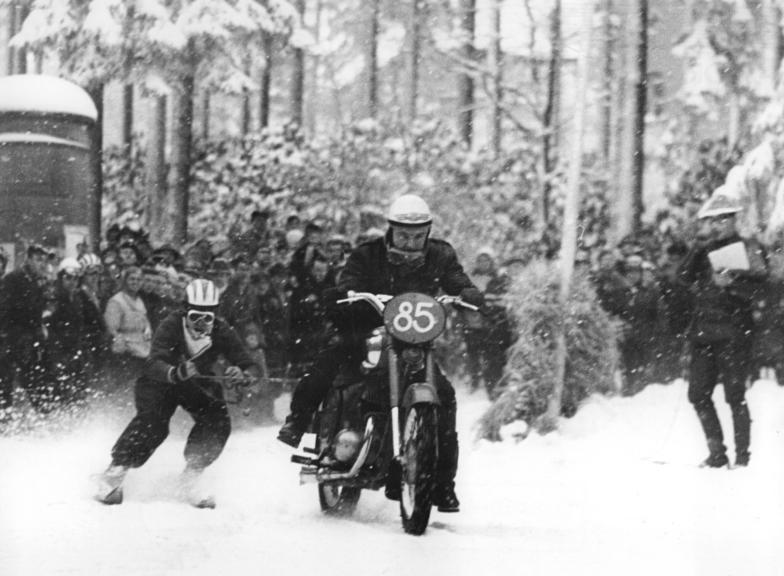
Skijoring with motorcycles, Augustusburg, Germany, 1963

Equine skijoring came to the United States as the result of American tourists traveling to destinations such as Chamonix, Garmisch-Partenkirchen and Saint Moritz where skijoring was widely offered as a recreational activity. Evidence is provided by vintage postcards of this era. Both men and women partook in this winter activity. Competitive skijoring was further popularized at winter carnivals in Hanover, New Hampshire, home to Dartmouth College, and Steamboat Springs, Colorado, as early as 1915. The western style of racing side by side with a rider on the horse and the skier towed by a rope down a main street gained popularity in mountain towns like Jackson, Wyoming and Aspen, Colorado during the 1930s and 1950s.

To simplify the equipment, cowboys on horseback simply attached a long rope to the saddle horn of a western saddle, added a knot at the end of the rope, and the skier held on as the horse was ridden at a gallop down a long straightaway—usually an open field or a snow-covered roadway. Originally these matches ran multiple teams of horse, rider and skier side by side against one another rather than single teams against the clock. This is how modern American races were born. The city of Leadville, Colorado, first organized an equestrian competition in 1949, which continues today. The Leadville version introduced gates, jumps and rings creating an obstacle course for the skier. In contrast, European races may or may not have a rider on the horse such as in Poland. In Saint Moritz, Switzerland, skiers rein the horses from behind and compete in a heat on a full oval track.

Denver, Colorado, listed skijoring as an exhibition sport in their bid for the 1976 Winter Olympics. Although Denver won the bid, the city ultimately turned it down, and skijoring was likewise not held. There is an effort to include equine skijoring in a future Winter Olympic Games should they be awarded to Salt Lake City, Utah, in 2030 or 2034. While it is highly unlikely the sport would be included as a competitive event due to several factors, there is hope that it would make an appearance to honor its 100th anniversary as either a demonstration sport or as part of the opening ceremony or torch relay.

By 1924, skiers were being towed by motorcycles or automobiles in races. In modern-day Latvia, skiers are towed in a motocross-style event called Twitch'n'Ride. At the Arctic Man competition in Alaska, skiers are towed behind snowmobiles that travel up to 86 miles per hour (138 km/h). Currently, in the United Kingdom, athletes are skijoring on turf or in arenas. In some coastal regions in France and on Caribbean islands, skijoring occurs on beaches.

In 2022, there are nearly 30 events in the United States and Canada as well as the White Turf event in St. Moritz, Switzerland, which spans three consecutive weekends and 7 events in the Podhale region of southern Poland. Equine skijoring continues to gain media exposure with live broadcasts of American events on the Cowboy Channel and the Wrangler Network.

== Dog skijoring ==
=== Overview ===
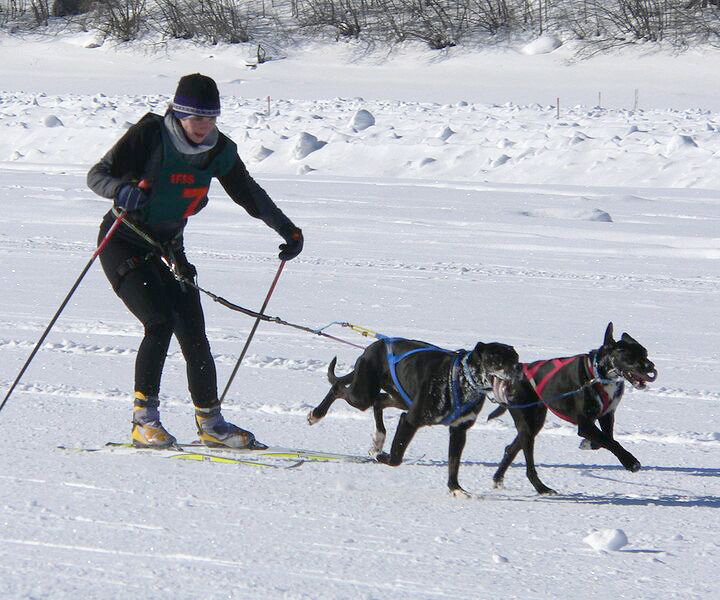
Skijoring with dogs

Skijoring in 1909

Another theory suggests that skijoring may have originated in China, where dogs were used for pulling travelers over snow. Historian E. John B. Allen notes that during the Yuan and Ming dynasties (1271–1644), Chinese sources described "tens of dogs pulling a person on a pair of wooden boards ... galloping on the snow and ice faster than a horse". He explains that this material ultimately derives from a Tang dynasty account that was later incorporated into a Persian chronicle—often attributed to Rashid al-Din Hamadani—and made widely available through Western translations beginning in 1878.

Modern dog skijoring assists a cross-country skier. One to three dogs are commonly used. The skier provides power with skis and poles, and the dog adds additional power by running and pulling. The skier wears a skijoring harness, the dog wears a sled dog harness, and the two are connected by a length of rope. There are no reins or other signaling devices to control the dog; the dog must be motivated by its own desire to run, and respond to the owner's voice for direction.

Many breeds of dog participate in skijoring. The only prerequisite is a desire to run down a trail and pull, which is innate in many dogs. Small dogs (less than 40 lb (18 kg)) are rarely seen skijoring, because they do not greatly assist the skier; however, since the skier can provide as much power as is required to travel, any enthusiastic dog can participate. Athletic dogs such as eurohounds, pointers, setters and herding breeds take to skijoring with glee, as do most sled dog breeds; however, many other large, energetic dog breeds are utilized in this sport.

The sport is practiced recreationally and competitively, both for long-distance travel and for short (sprint) distances.

=== Competitions ===
Since many leashed dogs naturally tend to pull a skier with no training, the sport cannot claim a single country of origin. As a competitive sport, the first documented races were held in Scandinavia as an offshoot of the older sport of pulka. Competitive racing has been taken up in North America while its older cousin pulka racing has not yet become popular.

Skijor races are held in many countries where there is snow in winter. Most races are between 5–20 km (3.1–12.4 mi) in length. The longest race is the Kalevala, held in Kalevala, Karelia, Russia, with a distance of 440 km (270 mi). The River Runner 120, held in Whitehorse, Yukon, has a distance of 120 mi (190 km). In the US and Canada, skijoring races are often held in conjunction with sled dog races. In Scandinavia, skijor racing is tightly associated with the older Scandinavian sport of pulka.

Although some races are unsanctioned, held under the sole guidance of a local club, many races fall under one of three international organizations. In the US and Canada, ISDRA (International Sled Dog Racing Association) sanctions many races. In Europe, ESDRA (European Sled Dog Racing Association) provides sanctioning, and the IFSS (International Federation of Sleddog Sports) sanctions World Cup races throughout the globe, as well as a world championship race every two years. At the IFSS World championship event, skijoring races are separated into men's and women's, and one-dog and two-dog categories. The world's largest skijoring event occurred in February 2011 at the City of Lakes Loppet in Minneapolis. Two hundred skijoring teams raced in the event, which included the first-ever National Skijoring Championship.

=== Equipment ===
The skijoring belt worn by the skier is a wide waistband which is clipped around the skier's waist, and which may include leg loops to keep it in position. Rock climbing harnesses are also commonly used as skijoring belts.

The sled dog harness can be any of the several types of dog harness commonly used for dogsled racing.

The skijoring line is usually at least 2.5 m (8 ft 2 in) long. A longer line is used for a three-dog team. A section of bungee cord is often incorporated into the line to absorb the impact of the dog's forward motion or a quick stop by the skier. Special quick-release hitches or hooks are available, used so that the skijorer may unhook the dog's lead rapidly.

=== Techniques and training ===
The skier uses either a classic diagonal stride cross-country technique, or the faster skate skiing technique. In races, the skate-skiing technique is almost exclusively used. The skis are hot waxed from tip to tail, to avoid slowing the dog team down. Classic skis with grip wax are not used for races but are occasionally used for extended back-country travel.

Skijoring dogs are taught the classic dog sledding commands to start running ("hike"), turn ("gee" and "haw"—right and left respectively in the US), to stop ("whoa") and to pass distractions ("on by"). Training is best done on foot, before the person straps on their skis, to avoid being pulled into objects, like trees or half-frozen creeks.

To participate in races, skijoring dogs must be taught to pass, or be passed by, other teams without interfering with them. An overly friendly attempt by one dog to stop and greet another team passing at high speed can be as problematic as a dog that attempts to nip other dogs in passing. A top skijor racing team can pass other teams head-on, without even turning to look at them.

== Equestrian skijoring ==
=== Standard ===
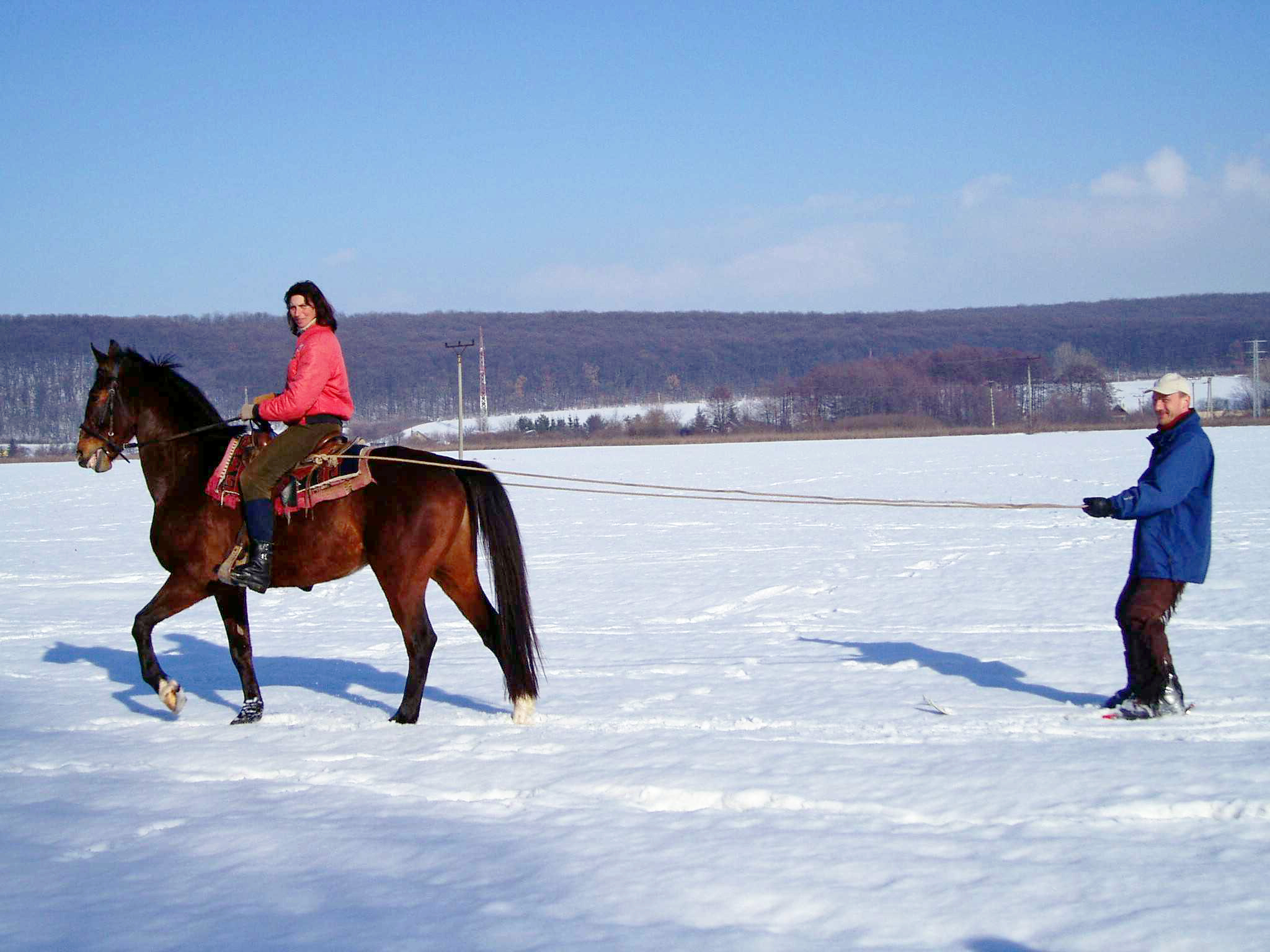
Equestrian skijoring

Equestrian skijoring usually consists of a team of a horse and two people: a rider for the horse, and a skier. A rider controls the horse, and the person on skis carries no poles and holds a tow rope in a manner akin to water skiing. In some places in Europe, competitions involve a riderless horse who is guided by the skier. Open snowpacked fields and community streets are sometimes used, although horse racetracks are also used in some places.

The horses gallop down a track roughly 900–1,200 feet (270–370 m) in length. Skiers must navigate a series of jumps and gates. At some events, to add difficulty, the skier is also required to grab one or more rings as they ski past a station on the course. On a straight track, the horse runs down the middle of the course with the skier navigating slalom gates and jumps on either side of the track. Some places use a horseshoe-shaped track that allows the horse to run on the inside of the track and the ski jumps are set on the outside of the track for the skier. Jumps are 2 to 7 feet (0.61 to 2.13 m) in height, lower on curved tracks or in places where snowboarders wish to compete.

Venues may also offer novelty events, such as a long jump competition where the horse pulls a skier who jumps for maximum distance, similar to gelandesprung, but landing on the flat. Some teams emphasize a speed-acceleration "crack-the-whip" effect by either having the horse veer to the side immediately before the jump, or the skier will carve his or her own crack-the-whip before attempting the jump. Competitors have reached 56 feet (17 m).

=== Equipment ===
Competitors often use short skis and modified water skiing towing equipment, though often this is as simple as a single tow rope attached to the saddle horn or behind the cantle of a western saddle. Some variants in equipment attach two towing lines to either the back of a saddle or a breastplate on the horse. Timing is typically electronic, with top competitions decided by hundredths of seconds. There are typically three classes of teams: Pro/Open, Sport, and Novice. There may be age divisions, as well as separate events for Women or people with and Snowboards. At times, 100 teams compete each day over a racing weekend, prize pots can reach upwards of $20,000.

The horses are trained to accept the presence of ropes and a skier behind them, and to remain calm in racing conditions. The skier is timed through the course, and penalties are assessed by missing gates or jumps, and by missing or dropping any of the rings. The competitors often race for cash prizes.

=== Competition venues ===
Competitive equine skijoring races take place in eight states in the US, most in the Rocky Mountain West, as well as in St. Moritz, Switzerland, and Alberta, Canada. There are different variations of the sport across numerous countries worldwide: France, Switzerland, Denmark, Latvia, Norway, Sweden, Finland, Poland, Ukraine and Russia.

Today, in Europe, equine skijoring gets the most exposure during White Turf in St. Moritz, Switzerland. White Turf, an event which features horse racing on snow as well as chariot racing and skijoring, began in 1907 and draws over 35,000 spectators a day. In Poland, Gazdowska and Kumoterska Parades feature skijoring in the Podhale region of the Tatra Mountains with seven events planned in 2022. In Alberta, Canada, Skijor Canada holds an event in Banff during Winter Carnival and another race occurs in Blairmore in the Crowsnest region of Alberta.

In the United States, Leadville, Colorado, has been hosting a competition down its main street since 1949. Leadville will host their 74th race in 2022. Steamboat Springs, Colorado, claims skijoring has been a tradition at the Steamboat Springs Winter Carnival for over 100 years.

Other US venues include: Wisdom, Red Lodge, Boulder, Lewistown, Whitefish, Big Sky and West Yellowstone, Montana; Clark Fork, Hailey and Driggs, Idaho; Gillette, Saratoga, Pinedale, Sundance, Buffalo and Sheridan, Wyoming; Kamas and Garden City, Utah; and Silverton, Leadville, Meeker, Pagosa Springs and Ridgway, Colorado. Canterbury Park in Shakopee, Minnesota, and both Skowhegan and Topsham, Maine, also host races.

=== Organizations ===
Skijor International was founded in 2012 to promote the sport of equine skijoring. Skijor USA, an affiliate founded in 2018, currently promotes a national circuit of nearly 30 races. Skijor International, LLC and Skijor USA, Inc, seek to unify the sport, attract more media and sponsorships and ultimately, bring equine skijoring back to the Winter Olympic Games in some capacity in 2030 or 2034, marking 100 years of skijoring history.

== Motorized skijoring ==
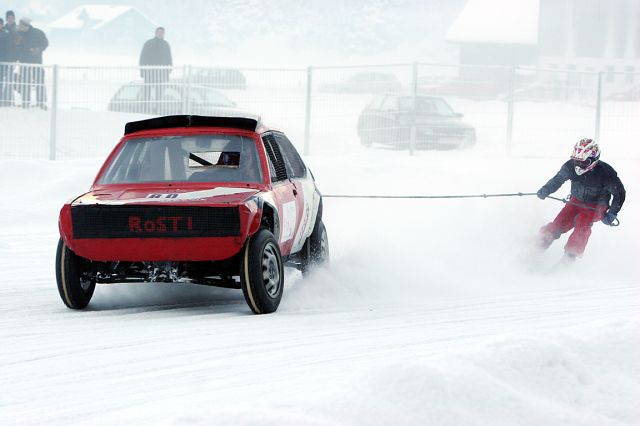
Motorized skijoring

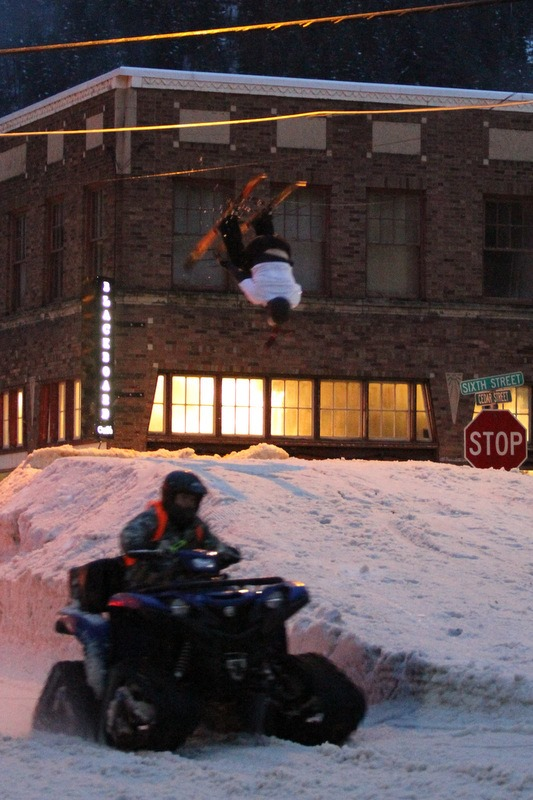
Tracked ATVs pull skiers through obstacles and jumps along a historic downtown.

Skijoring can also take place behind a snowmobile or other small motorized vehicle. The vehicle and driver pull a skier in a manner more akin to the equestrian style, which is more suited for higher speeds than is the dog skijoring style.

Another variant can tow skiers behind an all-terrain carrier such as the Bandvagn 206. In this case, several skiers or soldiers can be towed on the same rope. The rope is passed around the skier's ski poles and continues to the next person in line. Skiers then preferably hang on to their ski poles, supported by their arms.

Wallace, Idaho, converts its historic downtown 6th street into an extreme skijor track. The competition is a non-profit promotion of the town's viability during the winter months. The downtown area does not have enough room for horses to reach top speed. Therefore, they have substituted horses with motors. The competition has had ATVs, side-by-sides, and tracked ATVs as the equestrian stand in. The competitions started with traditional time trials and rings. Now the competition is better described as Slopestyle and Rail Jam. The competition brings thousands to the area as spectators.

== In the media ==
Skijoring features in the 1998 film Silver Wolf, starring Michael Biehn and Roy Scheider. Skijoring is also mentioned in the Castle Films short Snow Thrills, which was later included in an episode of Mystery Science Theater 3000. In the episode, the sport is pronounced by host Joel Robinson as "she-horring". Another character, Tom Servo, describes skijoring as "A safe and fun way to blow a Saturday... or a knee!"

Variations of skijoring include snowboarding while hitched to a dog, and "grassjoring," skijoring on grassy fields rather than snow. Related summer sports include bikejoring and canicross.

Features in The Grand Tour episode A Scandi Flick on a Swedish frozen lake.

== See also ==
- Yak skiing
- List of equestrian sports
- Bikejoring (Mushing)
