= Basque pelota at the 1924 Summer Olympics =

Basque pelota was a demonstration sport at the 1924 Summer Olympics in Paris. It was the second time that the sport was included in the Olympic program; it was an official Olympic sport at the 1900 Games that were also held in Paris. It would be included as a demonstration in another two occasions at the 1968 Games in Mexico City and the 1992 Games in Barcelona.

A court was built at the Porte de Billancourt for the Basque pelota events. The teams of France and Spain were the only participants.

== Events ==
Hand-pelota

1. Iceta, Ledesma, Gastesi (ESP) - 45
2. Doyhenart, Anchagno, Teylaguina (FRA) - 26

Paleta

1. Adarraga, Cantolla (ESP) - 40
2. Etcheberry Brothers (FRA) - 24

Basket-pelota

1. Sagarna, Garate, Santamaría (ESP) - 60
2. Camino, Harizpe, Magescas (FRA) - 52
