= Glíma at the Summer Olympics =

Glíma (Icelandic wrestling) was featured in the Summer Olympic Games demonstration programme in 1908 and 1912.
