= Skijoring at the 1928 Winter Olympics =

Skijoring (also Skijoering) was a demonstration sport at the 1928 Winter Olympics, held in St. Moritz, Switzerland from February 11 to 19, 1928. The sole skijoring event of the Games was held on February 12, the second day of the Games. The sport of skijoring is one in which a person on skis is pulled by dogs, horses, or a form of mechanized transportation such as a snowmobile. In the 1928 Olympics, athletes were towed behind horses.

Skijoring's roots are in Norway and Sweden, where the sport was considered a military competition, being a method of transportation for military dispatches. It was included on the program of the Nordic Games in 1901, 1905, and 1909. Pierre de Coubertin, founder of the modern Olympic Games, and media outlets like The Times admired the sport after its inclusion in the Nordic Games, and contributed to the brief popularization which led to its inclusion as a demonstration sport in the Games. Coubertin in particular, in his report on the 1901 Nordic Games in the publication Revue Olympique, expressed interest in incorporating such winter sports into the Olympic Games, and mentioned skijoring in particular as being of interest. Thus, it was included in the 1928 Winter Olympics as a demonstration sport.

The competition in St. Moritz was held on a frozen lake. Unlike modern equestrian skijoring in North America, there were no riders on the horses, there were no jumps on the course, and athletes competed simultaneously. The event was swept by three Swiss athletes. Although the sport was included as a demonstration sport in 1928, the Official Report of those Olympic Games does not list results of the contest. This was the last time the sport was included in the Games; it never appeared again as either a demonstration or medal sport.

== Results ==
Place	Nation	Athlete
1	Switzerland	Rudolf Wettstein
2	Switzerland	Bibi Torriani
3	Switzerland	Henryk Mückenbrunn
