= Savate at the 1924 Summer Olympics =

Savate, also known as French kickboxing, was featured in the Summer Olympic Games demonstration programme in 1924. There were 19 competitors from France and Belgium.
