= 1928 Summer Olympics =

Multi-sport event in Amsterdam, Netherlands

Games of the IX Olympiad
- Poster for the 1928 Summer Olympics
- Location: Amsterdam, Netherlands
- Nations: 46
- Athletes: 2,883 (2,606 men, 277 women)
- Events: 109 in 14 sports (20 disciplines)
- Opening: 28 July 1928
- Closing: 12 August 1928
- Opened by: Prince Hendrik
- Stadium: Olympisch Stadion

The 1928 Summer Olympics (Dutch: Olympische Zomerspelen 1928), officially the Games of the IX Olympiad (Spelen van de IXe Olympiade), was an international multi-sport event that was celebrated from 28 July to 12 August 1928 in Amsterdam, Netherlands. The city of Amsterdam had previously bid for the 1920 and 1924 Olympic Games. Still, it was obliged to give way to war-torn Antwerp in Belgium for the 1920 Games and Pierre de Coubertin's Paris for the 1924 Games.

The only other candidate city for the 1928 Olympics was Los Angeles, which would eventually be selected to host the Olympics four years later. In preparation for the 1932 Summer Olympics, the United States Olympic Committee reviewed the costs and revenue of the 1928 Games. The committee reported a total cost of US$1.183 million with receipts of US$1.165 million, giving a negligible loss of US$18,000, which was a considerable improvement over the 1924 Games.

The United States won the most gold and medals overall.

== Bidding process ==
Dutch nobleman Frederik van Tuyll van Serooskerken first proposed Amsterdam as the host city for the Summer Olympic Games in 1912, even before the Netherlands Olympic Committee was established.

The Olympic Games were canceled in 1916 due to World War I. In 1919, the Netherlands Olympic Committee abandoned the proposal of Amsterdam in favor of their support for the nomination of Antwerp as host city for the 1920 Summer Olympics. In 1921, Paris was selected for the 1924 Summer Olympics on the condition that the 1928 Summer Olympics would be organized in Amsterdam. This decision, supported by the Netherlands Olympic Committee, was announced by the International Olympic Committee (IOC) on 2 June 1921.

Los Angeles' bid for the 1928 Summer Olympics was unsuccessful in 1922 and again in 1923. The city was eventually selected as host city for the 1932 Summer Olympics, being the only bidder for that year.

== Organization and innovations ==
- These were the first Olympics to be organized under the IOC presidency of Henri de Baillet-Latour.
- These Games were the first to bear the name "Summer Olympic Games", to distinguish them from the Winter Olympic Games (held since 1924).
- Although competitions began in May 17, 1928. These Games were the first to feature a schedule of sixteen days in between ceremonies. Competitions had been stretched out over four months, the last event being on August 12, 1928.
- The events were entirely funded through private donations with the government of the host nation providing no financial support for the first time.
- The American company Coca-Cola made its first appearance as an official sponsor of the Olympic Games, remaining the oldest Olympic sponsor to this day.

== Ceremonies and traditions ==
- A symbolic fire was lit for the first time during the Olympics, a tradition that continues today. The first Olympic flame and torch relay, however, would not take place until the 1936 Summer Olympics.
- For the first time, the parade of nations started with Greece, which holds the origins of the Olympics, and ended with the host country, a tradition that has continued ever since.
- The Games were officially opened by Prince Hendrik, consort of Queen Wilhelmina, who had authorized her husband to deputize for her. The Queen was unable to attend the opening ceremony as she was on holiday in Norway and did not want to disrupt her trip. This was the second time a head of state had not personally officiated at an Olympic opening ceremony (the first occasion being the 1904 Games in St. Louis, Missouri, which were officially opened by David R. Francis, the Mayor of St. Louis). The Queen had initially refused to appear at either the opening or closing ceremony; it is thought that she objected to the Netherlands hosting the 1928 Games as she considered the Olympics a demonstration of paganism. However, she returned from Norway before the conclusion of the Games, to be present at the closing ceremony, and she presented the first prizes at the prize distribution which was held immediately beforehand.

== Athlete highlights ==
- Paavo Nurmi of Finland won his ninth, and final, gold medal in the 10,000 m race.
- Canadian athlete Percy Williams exceeded expectations by winning both the 100 m and 200 m sprint events.
- Crown Prince Olav, who would later become King of Norway, won a gold medal in the 6 meter sailing event.
- Pat O'Callaghan won the first ever medal for a newly independent Ireland, taking gold in the hammer throw.
- Mikio Oda of Japan won the triple jump event with a result of 15.21 m (49 ft 10.82 in), becoming the first gold medalist from an Asian country.
- Betty Robinson of the USA won the women's 100 metres in a world record time of 12.2 seconds. She was still just 16 years of age at the time.
- Algerian-born marathon runner Boughera El Ouafi won a gold medal for France in the men's marathon.
- Johnny Weissmuller, who later appeared in several Tarzan movies, won two gold medals in swimming: an individual gold in the men's 100 m freestyle, and a team gold in the men's 4 × 200 m freestyle relay.
- Germany returned to the Olympic Games for the first time since 1912, after being banned from the 1920 and 1924 Games due to its role in World War I. The German team immediately finished second in the 1928 medal count.
- South American football made a definite breakthrough, as Uruguay retained its title by defeating Argentina.
- India took its first ever gold medal in field hockey, beginning a streak of six consecutive gold medals in the sport.

== Sports ==
During the 1928 Summer Olympics, there were 14 sports, 20 disciplines and 109 events in the tournament. In parentheses is the number of events per discipline.

- Aquatics
  - Diving (4)
  - Swimming (11)
  - Water polo (1)
- Athletics (27)
- Boxing (8)
- Cycling
  - Road (2)
  - Track (4)
- Equestrian
  - Dressage (2)
  - Eventing (2)
  - Show jumping (2)
- Fencing (7)
- Field hockey (1)
- Football (1)
- Gymnastics (8)
- Modern pentathlon (1)
- Rowing (7)
- Sailing (3)
- Weightlifting (5)
- Wrestling
  - Freestyle (7)
  - Greco-Roman (6)

Women's athletics and team gymnastics debuted at these Olympics, in spite of criticism. Five women's athletics events were added: 100 meters, 800 meters, high jump, discus, and 400 meter hurdles. In protest of the limited number of events, British women athletes, boycotted the Games. Halina Konopacka of Poland became the first female Olympic track and field champion. Reports that the 800 meter run ended with several of the competitors being completely exhausted were widely (and erroneously) circulated. As a result, the IOC decided that women were too frail for long-distance running, and women's Olympic running events were limited to 200 meters until the 1960s.

Tennis disappeared from the program until it reappeared in 1968 as a demonstration sport.

=== Demonstration sports ===
- Kaatsen (not considered official by the IOC)
- Korfball
- Lacrosse

These Games also included art competitions in five categories: architecture, painting, sculpture, literature, and music. However, the IOC no longer considers these to be official medal events, so the medals awarded are not included in today's Olympic medal counts.

== Venues ==
Aerial view of the Olympisch Stadion during the opening ceremony

Fourteen sports venues were used for the 1928 Summer Olympics. The Swim Stadium was demolished in 1929. The Het Kasteel football stadium was renovated in 1998–99. The Monnikenhuize stadium was demolished in 1950. The Schermzaal sports hall has also been demolished.

The Olympic Stadium was renovated between 1996 and 2000, and is still in use. The Old Stadion was demolished in 1929 and replaced with housing in the Amsterdam area.

Many cars were expected for the Games, but Amsterdam had at most 2,000 single-car parking spaces. Consequently, several new parking sites were provided, and a special parking symbol was launched to show foreign visitors where they could park.

The white P on a blue background was to become the international traffic sign for parking, and is still used today. Athletics events were held on a 400-meter track, later becoming the standard for athletics tracks.

Venue	Sports	Capacity	Ref.
Amersfoort	Modern pentathlon (riding)	Not listed	
Amsterdam	Cycling (road)	Not listed	
Buiten-IJ	Sailing	2,263	
Hilversum	Equestrian (dressage and cross-country), Modern pentathlon (running)	4,763	
Krachtsportgebouw	Boxing, Weightlifting, Wrestling	4,634	
Monnikenhuize (Arnhem)	Football	7,500	
Old Stadion	Field hockey, Football	29,787	
Olympic Sports Park Swim Stadium	Diving, Modern pentathlon (swimming), Swimming, Water polo	6,000	
Olympic Stadium	Athletics, Cycling (track), Equestrian (jumping), Football, Gymnastics, Korfball	33,025	
Schermzaal	Fencing, Modern pentathlon (fencing)	559	
Sloterringvaart, Sloten	Rowing	2,230	
Sparta Stadion Het Kasteel (Rotterdam)	Football	11,026	
Zeeburg Shooting Grounds	Modern pentathlon (shooting)	10,455	
Zuiderzee	Sailing	2,263	

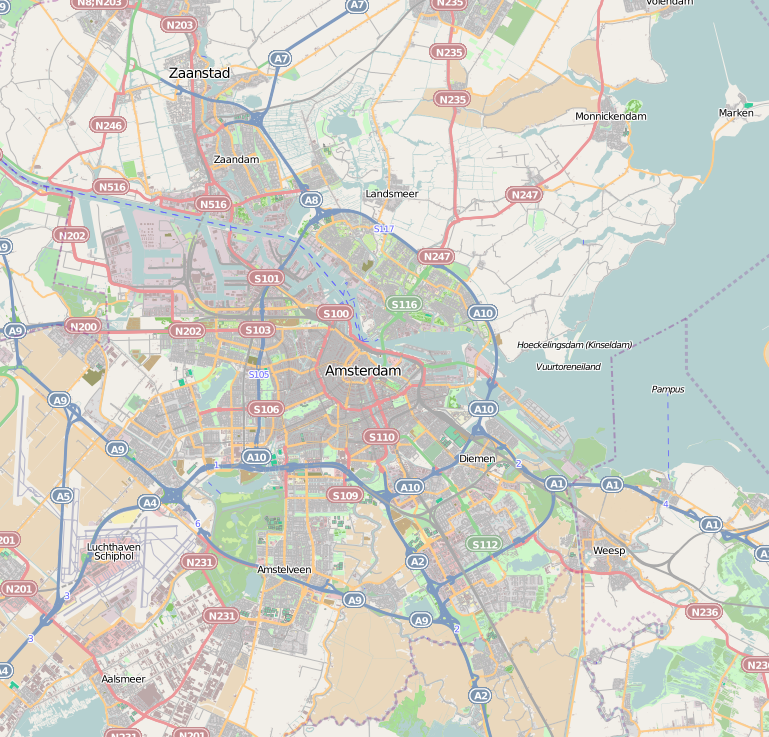
Map of the Amsterdam region with Olympic venues marked. The Krachtsportgebouw, Oude Stadion and Schermzaal were located next to the Olympic Stadium.
Map of the Netherlands with Olympic venues marked. (Note: Although Flevoland is depicted in this map, it did not exist at this time.)

== Participating nations ==
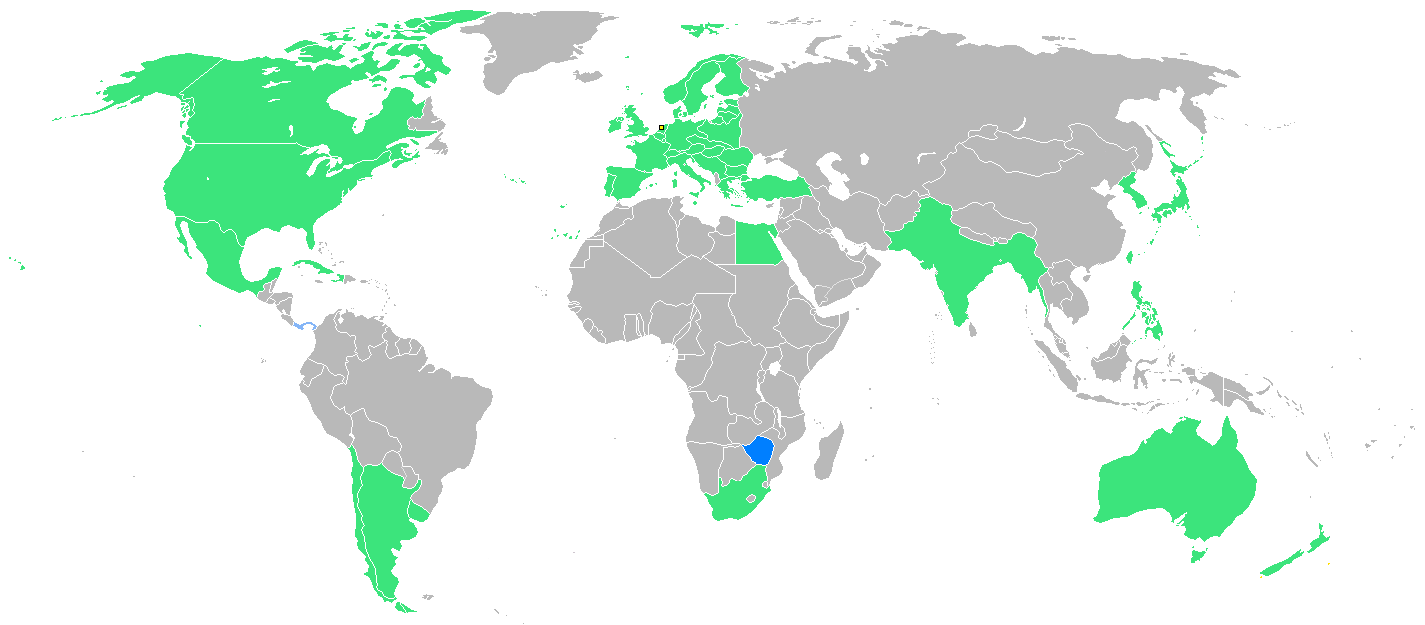
Participants

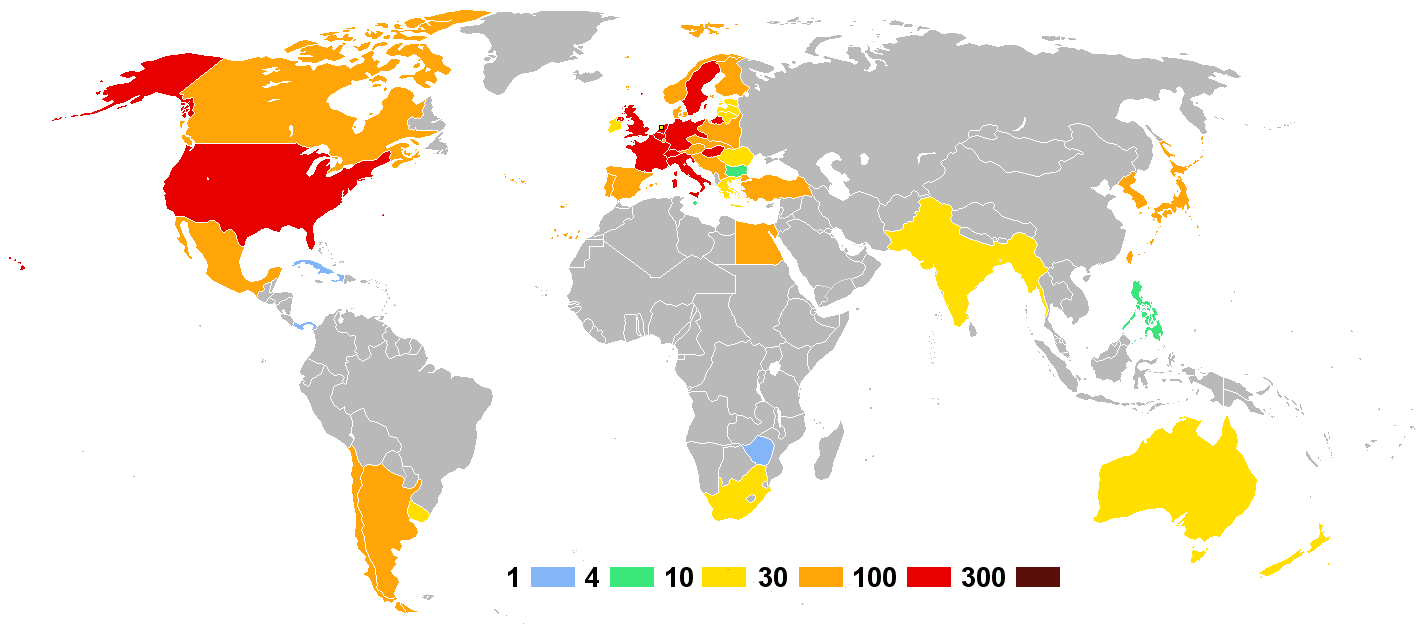
Number of athletes

A total of 46 nations were represented at the Amsterdam Games. Malta, Panama, and Rhodesia (now Zimbabwe) competed at the Olympic Games for the first time. Germany returned after having been banned in 1920 and 1924.

The nations that participated in the previous games in Paris 1924 but were absent in Amsterdam 1928 were Brazil and Ecuador.

At the time, Australia, New Zealand, Canada, South Africa and Ireland were all dominions of the British Empire. India and Rhodesia were also a part of the British Empire, but were not dominions. For other sovereign states (i.e. United States, France, Argentina, Japan, etc.) and the international community as a whole (i.e. League of Nations) the term dominion, used internally in the British Empire, was very ambiguous, meaning "something between a colony and state". It was only years later with the Statute of Westminster 1931 that this ambiguity would be dispelled. Philippines was an unincorporated territory and commonwealth of the United States.

Participating National Olympic Committees
- Argentina (81 athletes)
- Australia (18)
- Austria (73)
- Belgium (186)
- Bulgaria (5)
- Canada (69)
- Chile (38)
- Cuba (1)
- Czechoslovakia (70)
- Denmark (91)
- Egypt (32)
- Estonia (20)
- Finland (69)
- France (255)
- Germany (296)
- Great Britain (232)
- Greece (23)
- Haiti (2)
- Hungary (109)
- India (21)
- Ireland (27)
- Italy (174)
- Japan (43)
- Latvia (14)
- Lithuania (12)
- Luxembourg (46)
- Malta (9)
- Mexico (30)
- Monaco (7)
- Netherlands (264) (host)
- New Zealand (10)
- Norway (52)
- Panama (1)
- Philippines (4)
- Poland (93)
- Portugal (31)
- Rhodesia (2)
- Romania (29)
- South Africa (24)
- Spain (80)
- Sweden (100)
- Switzerland (133)
- Turkey (31)
- United States (280)
- Uruguay (22)
- Yugoslavia (34)

=== Number of athletes by National Olympic Committees ===
Country	Athletes
Germany	295
United States	280
Netherlands	266
France	255
Great Britain	232
Belgium	187
Italy	174
Switzerland	133
Hungary	109
Sweden	100
Poland	93
Denmark	91
Argentina	81
Spain	80
Austria	73
Czechoslovakia	70
Canada	69
Finland	69
Norway	52
Luxembourg	48
Japan	43
Chile	38
Ireland	38
Yugoslavia	34
Egypt	32
Portugal	31
Turkey	31
Mexico	30
South Africa	24
Greece	23
Uruguay	22
India	21
Romania	21
Estonia	20
Australia	18
Latvia	15
Lithuania	12
New Zealand	10
Malta	9
Monaco	7
Bulgaria	5
Philippines	4
Haiti	2
Rhodesia	2
Cuba	1
Panama	1
Total	2,883

== Medal count ==
These are the top ten nations that won medals at the 1928 Games.

Rank	Nation	Gold	Silver	Bronze	Total
1	United States	22	18	16	56
2	Germany	10	7	14	31
3	Finland	8	8	9	25
4	Sweden	7	6	12	25
5	Italy	7	5	7	19
6	Switzerland	7	4	4	15
7	France	6	10	5	21
8	Netherlands*	6	9	4	19
9	Hungary	4	5	0	9
10	Canada	4	4	7	15
Totals (10 entries)		81	76	78	235

== Poster ==
Official poster

The official poster for the Games displaying a running man in a white shirt was designed by Jos Rovers however the IOC never succeeded in obtaining the copyright of the image. The IOC used a different poster, with the German text Olympische Spiele, and an athlete partly covered in the Dutch national flag, holding a peace leaf in his hand. The poster was made for a German book about the Amsterdam Olympics.

== Last surviving competitor ==
The last living competitor of the 1928 Summer Olympics was Carla Marangoni, a member of the silver medal-winning Italian gymnastic team who had been twelve years old during the Olympics. Marangoni died 18 January 2018, at the age of 102 as the oldest living Olympic medalist at the time of her death.

== See also ==
- 1928 Winter Olympics
- List of IOC country codes

== Notes ==
Summer Olympics
Preceded by Paris	IX Olympiad; Amsterdam; 1928	Succeeded by Los Angeles
