= Budo at the 1964 Summer Olympics =

Budō was featured in the Summer Olympic Games demonstration programme in 1964.

This included demonstration of kyūdō, kendo and sumo. Judo, which is a budo, was part of the regular program.
