= La canne at the 1924 Summer Olympics =

La canne, a French martial art using canes as weapons, was featured in the Summer Olympic Games demonstration programme in 1924. The demonstration was associated with a single match between Professor Prévot and the champion of France, Beauduin.
