= Disabled skiing at the Winter Olympics =

Disabled skiing was a demonstration event at the Winter Olympic Games on two occasions, in 1984 and 1988. Afterwards, the Paralympic Games were held in the same location as the Olympics and it was judged that as a demonstration event it was redundant. At the 1984 and 1988 Games, medals were awarded to the top three positions, but these medals were smaller in size and did not contribute to the overall medal count.

== 1984 Winter Olympics ==
At the 1984 Games in Sarajevo, four events in paralympic alpine skiing were contested, all for men only. Giant slalom races were held for four different standing disability classes.

Event	First	Second	Third
Giant slalom for above-the-knee amputees	Alexander Spitz (FRG)	Reiner Bergman (AUT)	David Jamison (USA)
Giant slalom for below-knee amputees	Markus Ramsauer (AUT)	Josef Meusburger (AUT)	Bill Latimer (USA)
Giant slalom for single-arm amputees	Paul Keukomm (SUI)	Dietmar Schweninger (AUT)	Rolf Heinzmann (SUI)
Giant slalom for double-arm amputees	Lars Lundström (SWE)	Felix Abele (FRG)	Cato Zahl Pedersen (NOR)

== 1988 Winter Olympics ==
At the 1988 Games in Calgary, events were held in paralympic alpine skiing for both men and women (giant slalom for a single standing disability class), and in paralympic cross-country skiing for both men and women (5 km for the visually impaired).

Event	First	Second	Third
Men's giant slalom for above-the-knee amputees	Alexander Spitz (FRG)	Greg Mannino (USA)	Fritz Berger (SUI)
Women's giant slalom for above-the-knee amputees	Diana Golden (USA)	Cathy Gentile (USA)	Martha Hill (USA)
Men's 5 km cross-country for blind	Hans Anton Aalien (NOR)	Åke Petterson (SWE)	Asmund Tveit (NOR)
Women's 5 km cross-country for blind	Veronika Preining (AUT)	Kirsti Pennanen (FIN)	Margret Heger (AUT)
