= Kaatsen at the 1928 Summer Olympics =

Kaatsen or Frisian handball (West Frisian: keatsen; Dutch: kaatsen) was featured in the 1928 Summer Olympics unofficial programme.

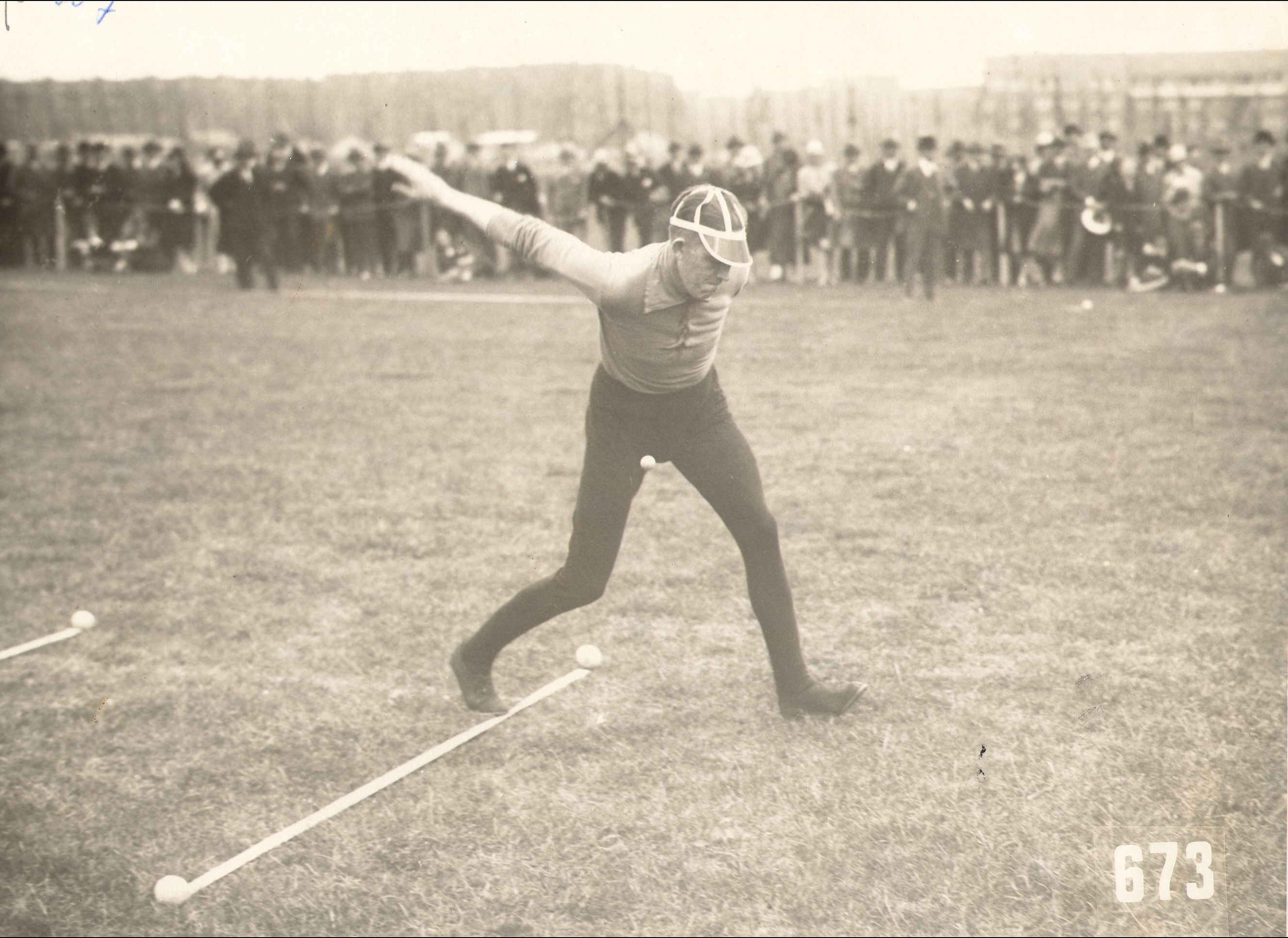
Kaatsen at the 1928 Summer Olympics

Kaatsen is a traditional Frisian sport, related to American handball and fives, that is most commonly practiced by people from the northern Dutch province of Friesland (Fryslân). It is believed to be one of the oldest ballgames. The score is similar to tennis. The first team scoring six games wins the match.
