= Korfball at the 1928 Summer Olympics =

Korfball at the Games of the IX Olympiad
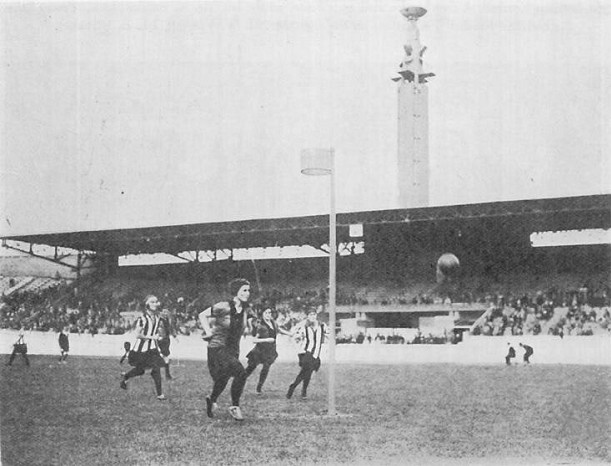
- Venue: Olympic Stadium
- Dates: 6 August 1928

Korfball was a demonstration sport at the 1928 Olympic Games in Amsterdam. It took place at the Olympic Stadium in Amsterdam at 6 August 1928. It was the second time that korfball was a demonstration sport at the Olympic Games. It was also a demonstration sport at the 1920 Olympic Games in Antwerp.

== Match ==
Two Dutch teams of 12 players played a match against each other at 6 August 1928. One team wore red-white shirts and the other team played in red-black shirts. The referee was H. W. Vliegen, LL. B. and the Assistant referees (linesmen) were G. Leeuw and W.C. Schaap, C.E..

=== The squads ===
The red-white team
Position	Red-white
Forward	G. de Mey (captain)
Forward	C. Wedemeyer
Forward	Mw. G. Voordenberg
Forward	Mw. M. 't Hart
Midfield	L. Looy
Midfield	G. Storm
Midfield	Mw. M. Klamer
Midfield	Mw. M. Trupp
Defend	B. Dorsman
Defend	J. van der Geest
Defend	Mw. A. Vaandrager
Defend	Mw. D. Richel

The red-black team
Position	Red-black
Forward	H. Gerding (captain)
Forward	H. Venema
Forward	Mw. F. Hendriksen
Forward	Mw. L. Wagenvoort
Midfield	A. Madsen
Midfield	K. Gruys
Midfield	Mw. A. Krelage
Midfield	Mw. J. de Koning
Defend	E. Eggink
Defend	A. Hendriksen
Defend	Mw. M. Klijn
Defend	Mw. C. Cohen
