= 1924 Summer Olympics =

Multi-sport event in Paris, France

Games of the VIII Olympiad
- Emblem of the 1924 Summer Olympics
- Location: Paris, France
- Nations: 44
- Athletes: 3,089 (2,954 men, 135 women)
- Events: 126 in 17 sports (23 disciplines)
- Opening: 5 July 1924
- Closing: 27 July 1924
- Opened by: President Gaston Doumergue
- Stadium: Stade Olympique Yves-du-Manoir

The 1924 Summer Olympics (French: Jeux olympiques d'été de 1924), officially the Games of the VIII Olympiad (French: Jeux de la VIII^{e} olympiade) and officially branded as Paris 1924, were an international multi-sport event held in Paris, France. The opening ceremony was held on 5 July, but some competitions had already started on 4 May. The Games were the second to be hosted by Paris (after 1900), making it the first city to host the Olympics twice.

The selection process for the 1924 Summer Olympics consisted of six bids, and Paris was selected ahead of Amsterdam, Barcelona, Los Angeles, Prague, and Rome. The selection was made at the 20th IOC Session in Lausanne in 1921. The cost of these Games was estimated to be 10,000,000 F (equivalent to €10.9 million in 2025). With total receipts at 5,496,610 F (equivalent to €5.97 million in 2025), the Olympics resulted in a hefty loss despite daily crowds of up to 60,000. The United States won the most gold and overall medals, having 229 athletes competing compared to France's 401. This would be the last Summer Games hosted by France until 2024.

== Highlights ==
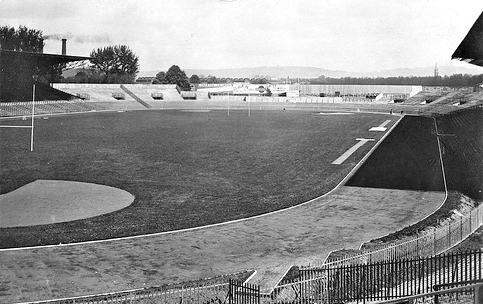
Colombes Olympic Stadium

- The Uruguay national football team won the gold medal in football, which was recognized as a world championship by FIFA.
- The opening ceremony and several sporting events took place in the Olympic Stadium of Colombes, which had a capacity of 45,000 in 1924.
- This VIII Olympiad was the last one organized under the presidency of Pierre de Coubertin.
- The "Flying Finns" dominated the long-distance running, while the British and Americans dominated the shorter events. Paavo Nurmi won the 1500 m and 5,000 m (which were held with only an hour between them) and the cross-country run. Ville Ritola won the 10,000 m and the 3,000 m steeplechase while finishing second to Nurmi in the 5,000 m and cross country. Albin Stenroos won the marathon, while the Finnish team (with Nurmi and Ritola) was victorious in the 3,000 m and cross-country team events.
- The British runners Harold Abrahams and Eric Liddell won the 100 m and the 400 m events, respectively. Liddell refused to compete in the 100-metre sprint because it was held on a Sunday, and he was an observant Christian. Their stories were depicted in the 1981 film Chariots of Fire. In addition, Douglas Lowe won the 800-metre competition.
- DeHart Hubbard became the first African-American to win an individual gold medal in the Long jump.
- The marathon distance was fixed at 42.195 km (26.219 mi), from the distance run at the 1908 Summer Olympics in London.
- The 1924 Olympics were the first to use the standard 50 m pool with marked lanes.
- Dual-sport athlete Johnny Weissmuller won three gold medals in swimming and one bronze in water polo.
- Harold Osborn won gold medals and set Olympic records in the high jump and the 1924 Olympic decathlon. His 6' 6" high jump remained the Olympic record for 12 years, while his decathlon score of 7,710.775 points also set a world record and resulted in worldwide press coverage recognizing him as the "world's greatest athlete."
- Fencer Roger Ducret of France won five medals, of which three were gold.
- In gymnastics, 24 men scored a perfect 10. Twenty-three scored it in the now-discontinued rope climbing event. Albert Seguin scored a ten here and a perfect ten on the side vault.
- The Olympic motto Citius, Altius, Fortius (Faster, Higher, Stronger) was used for the first time at the Olympics. It had been used before by the Union des Sociétés Françaises de Sports Athlétiques, a French sporting federation whose founding members included Pierre de Coubertin. De Coubertin took the motto from his friend Henri Didon, a Dominican priest who had coined the phrase during a speech before a Paris youth gathering of 1891.
- Ireland was given formal recognition as an independent nation in the Olympic Movement in Paris in 1924, and it was at these games that Ireland made its first appearance in the Olympic Games as an independent nation.
- Originally called Semaine des Sports d'Hiver ("Week of Winter Sports") and held in association with the 1924 Summer Olympics, the sports competitions held in Chamonix between 25 January and 5 February 1924 were later designated by the International Olympic Committee (IOC) as the I Olympic Winter Games. (1924 Winter Olympics)
- These were the first Games to have an Olympic Village.
- The Art competitions at the 1924 Summer Olympics were the first time that the Olympic Art competitions were contested seriously, with 193 entries in five categories. A total of 14 medals were awarded, though none were given in the music category.

== Sports ==
Overall map of the Olympic venues

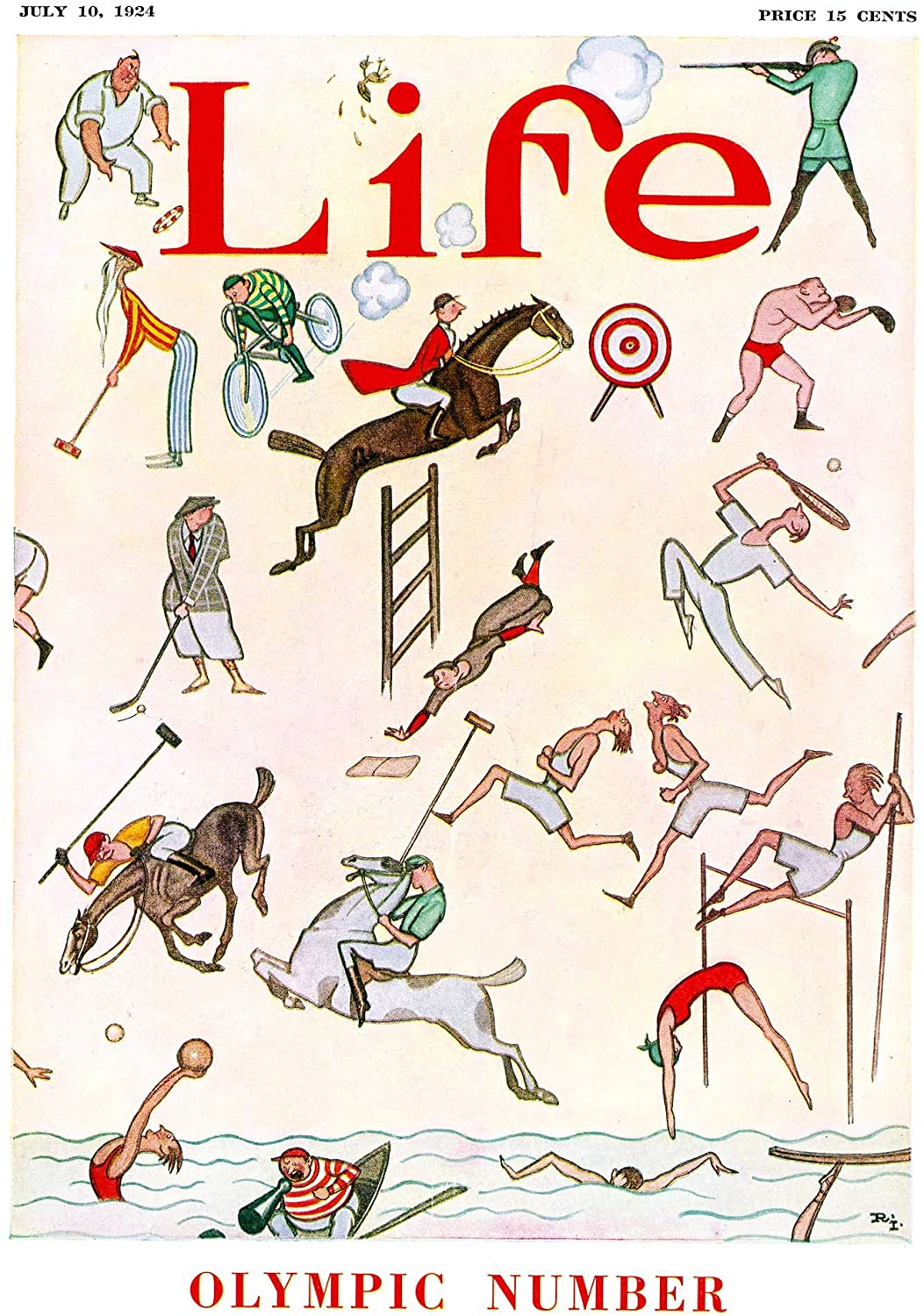
The "Olympic Number" of Life, 10 Jul 1924.

126 events in 23 disciplines, comprising 17 sports, were part of the Olympic program in 1924. The number of events in each discipline is noted in parentheses.

- Aquatics
  - Diving (5)
  - Swimming (11)
  - Water polo (1)
- Athletics (27)
- Boxing (8)
- Cycling
  - Road (2)
  - Track (4)
- Equestrian
  - Dressage (1)
  - Eventing (2)
  - Show jumping (2)
- Fencing (7)
- Football (1)
- Gymnastics (9)
- Modern pentathlon (1)
- Polo (1)
- Rowing (7)
- Rugby union (1)
- Sailing (3)
- Shooting (10)
- Tennis (5)
- Weightlifting (5)
- Wrestling
  - Freestyle (7)
  - Greco-Roman (6)

=== Demonstration sports ===
- Basque pelota
- Canoeing
- La canne
- Savate

=== Jeux de L’Enfance ===
The Jeux de L’Enfance, a program of youth sports competitions and activities, were held by Olympic organizers alongside the Games in cooperation with the YMCA. The following future Olympic sports were exhibited:

- Baseball
- Basketball
- Volleyball

== Venues ==
Map of Olympic sites

Seventeen sports venues were used in the 1924 Summer Olympics. Stade de Colombes served as the final venue for the 1938 FIFA World Cup between Italy and Hungary.

Venue	Sports	Capacity	Ref.
Bagatelle	Polo	598	
Bassin d'Argenteuil	Rowing	2,216	
Camp de Châlons	Shooting (600 m free rifle individual and team)	395	
Fontainebleau	Modern pentathlon (riding)	Not listed.	
Hippodrome d'Auteuil	Equestrian	8,922	
Issy-les-Moulineaux	Shooting (trap shooting, including team event)	41	
Le Havre	Sailing	541	
Le Stade Olympique de Reims	Shooting (trap shooting, running target)	420	
Le Stand de Tir de Versailles	Modern pentathlon (shooting), Shooting (25 m rapid fire pistol, running deer)	82	
Meulan-en-Yvelines	Sailing	389	
Piscine des Tourelles	Diving, Modern pentathlon (swimming), Swimming, Water polo	8,023	
Saint-Cloud	Polo	7,836	
Stade Bergeyre	Football	10,455	
Stade de Colombes	Athletics, Cycling (road), Equestrian, Fencing, Football (final), Gymnastics, Modern pentathlon (fencing, running), Rugby union, Tennis	60,000	
Stade de Paris	Football	5,145	
Stade Pershing	Football	8,110	
Vélodrome d'hiver	Boxing, Fencing, Weightlifting, Wrestling	10,884	
Vélodrome de Vincennes	Cycling (track)	12,750	

== Participating nations ==
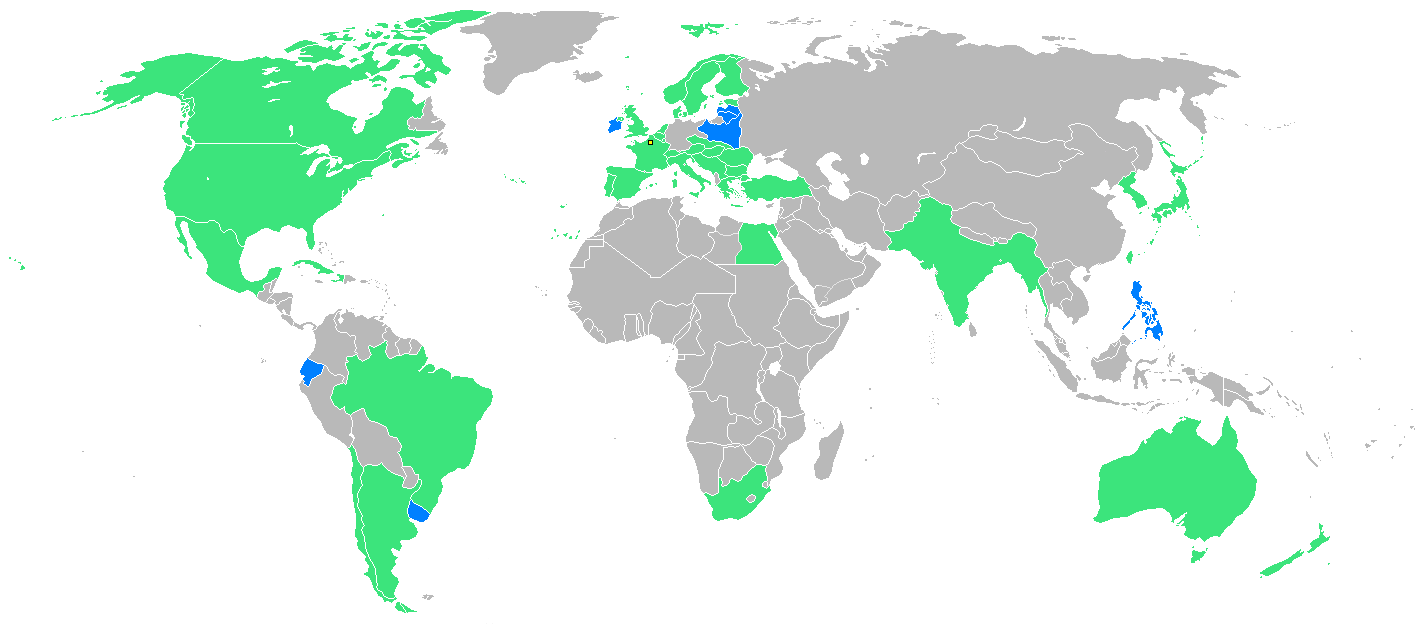
Participating Countries of the 1924 Olympiad

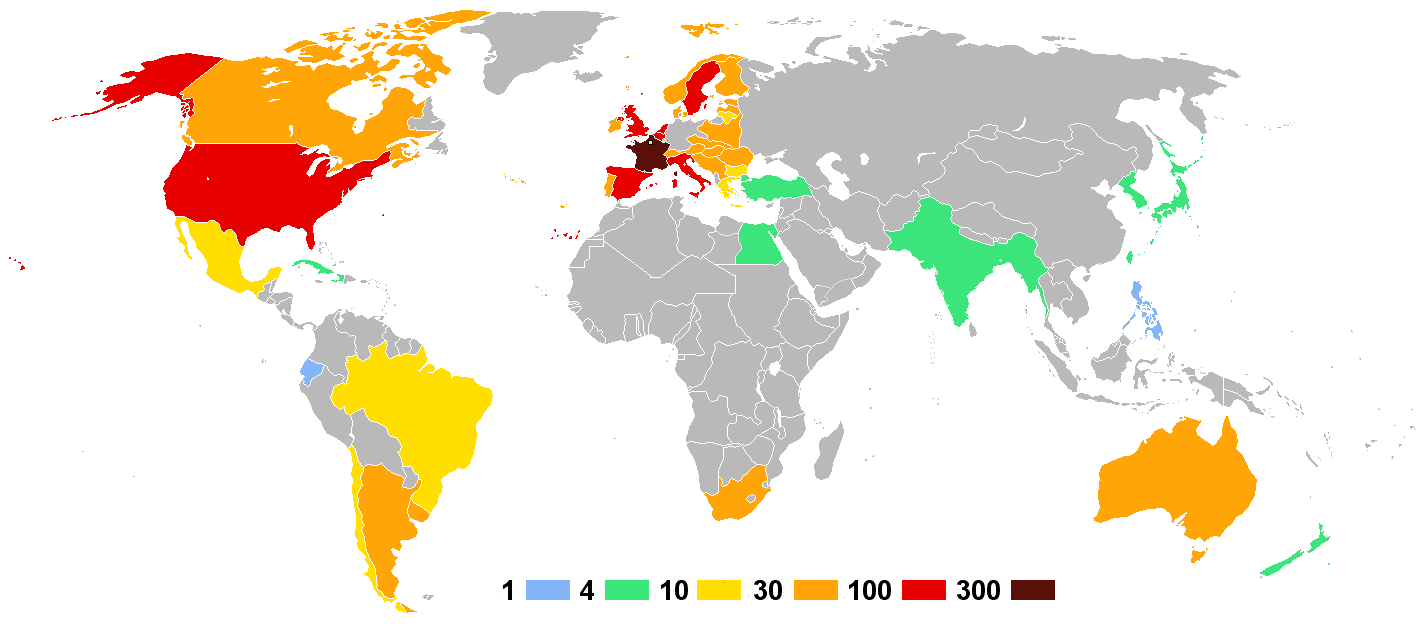
Number of athletes

A total of 44 nations were represented at the 1924 Games. Germany was still absent, having not been invited by the Organizing Committee. China (although it did not compete), Ecuador, Ireland, Lithuania, and Uruguay attended the Olympic Games for the first time, while the Philippines competed for first time in an Olympic Games as a nation (though it first participated in the 1900 Summer Olympic Games). Latvia and Poland also attended the Summer Olympic Games for the first time (having both appeared earlier at the 1924 Winter Olympics in Chamonix).

The 1924 Olympics saw a return of the following nations: Austria, Bulgaria, Cuba, Haiti, Hungary, Mexico, Romania and Turkey.

At the time, Australia, New Zealand, Canada, South Africa and Ireland were all dominions of the British Empire. India was also part of British Empire, but was not a dominion. For other sovereign states (i.e. United States, France, Brazil, Japan, etc) and the international community as a whole (i.e League of Nations) the term dominion, used internally in the British Empire, was very ambiguous, meaning "something between a colony and state". It was only years later with the Statute of Westminster 1931 that this ambiguity would be dispelled.

And Philippines was an unincorporated territory and commonwealth of the United States.

Participating National Olympic Committees
- Argentina (77 athletes)
- Australia (36)
- Austria (49)
- Belgium (172)
- Brazil (12)
- Bulgaria (24)
- Canada (65)
- Chile (11)
- Cuba (9)
- Czechoslovakia (70)
- Denmark (89)
- Ecuador (3)
- Egypt (33)
- Estonia (44)
- Finland (90)
- France (401) (host)
- Great Britain (267)
- Greece (26)
- Haiti (8)
- Hungary (89)
- India (7)
- Ireland (39)
- Italy (200)
- Japan (9)
- Latvia (41)
- Lithuania (13)
- Luxembourg (22)
- Mexico (13)
- Monaco (7)
- Netherlands (153)
- New Zealand (4)
- Norway (62)
- Philippines (1)
- Poland (65)
- Portugal (30)
- Romania (51)
- South Africa (30)
- Spain (129)
- Sweden (108)
- Switzerland (75)
- Turkey (31)
- United States (299)
- Uruguay (31)
- Yugoslavia (37)

- (Republic of China (1912–1949)) China also took part in the Opening Ceremony, but its four athletes (all tennis players) withdrew from competition.

=== Number of athletes by National Olympic Committees ===
Poster by Orsi promoting the 1924 Paris Olympics games.

Country	Athletes
France	401
United States	299
Great Britain	267
Italy	200
Netherlands	177
Belgium	172
Sweden	159
Switzerland	141
Czechoslovakia	133
Finland	121
Spain	95
Denmark	89
Hungary	89
Argentina	77
Canada	65
Poland	65
Norway	62
Luxembourg	51
Austria	49
Ireland	49
Estonia	44
Yugoslavia	42
Latvia	41
Greece	39
Australia	35
Romania	35
Uruguay	33
Portugal	30
South Africa	30
Bulgaria	24
Egypt	24
Turkey	21
Japan	19
Mexico	15
Chile	14
India	13
Lithuania	13
Brazil	12
Cuba	9
Haiti	8
Monaco	7
Republic of China	4
New Zealand	4
Ecuador	3
Philippines	1
Total	3,089

== Medal count ==
These are the nations that won medals the 1924 Games.

* Host nation (France)

1924 Summer Olympics medal table
Rank	Nation	Gold	Silver	Bronze	Total
1	United States	45	27	27	99
2	Finland	14	13	10	37
3	France*	13	15	10	38
4	Great Britain	9	13	12	34
5	Italy	8	3	5	16
6	Switzerland	7	8	10	25
7	Norway	5	2	3	10
8	Sweden	4	13	12	29
9	Netherlands	4	1	5	10
10	Belgium	3	7	3	13
11	Australia	3	1	2	6
12	Denmark	2	5	2	9
13	Hungary	2	3	4	9
14	Yugoslavia	2	0	0	2
15	Czechoslovakia	1	4	5	10
16	Argentina	1	3	2	6
17	Estonia	1	1	4	6
18	South Africa	1	1	1	3
19	Uruguay	1	0	0	1
20	Austria	0	3	1	4
20	Canada	0	3	1	4
22	Poland	0	1	1	2
23	Haiti	0	0	1	1
23	Japan	0	0	1	1
23	New Zealand	0	0	1	1
23	Portugal	0	0	1	1
23	Romania	0	0	1	1
Totals (27 entries)		126	127	125	378

== Art competitions ==
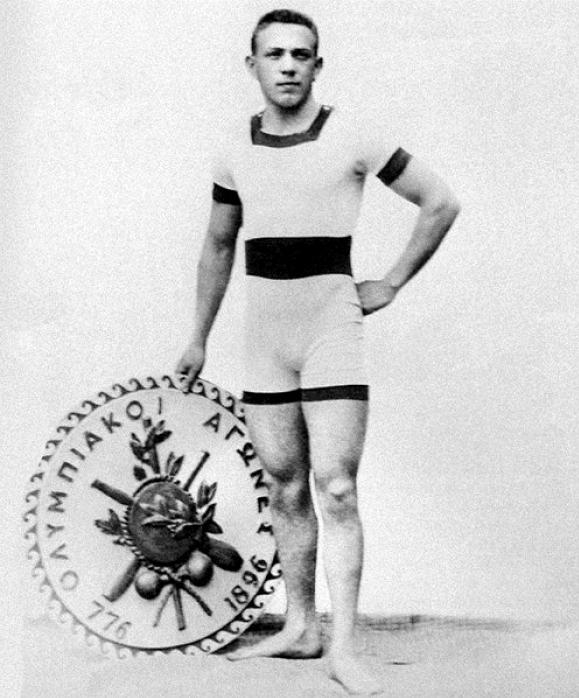
Alfréd Hajós at the 1896 Summer Olympics, where he became the first Olympic champion in swimming before winning the silver medal at these Games

The 1924 Summer Olympics also included art competitions across five disciplines: architecture, literature, music, painting, and sculpture, for works inspired by sport-related themes, were medal-eligible events at the time. Art competitions were held from the 1912 Summer Olympics until the 1948 Summer Olympics, but were discontinued over the amateurism controversy. Medals in art competitions are no longer recognized by the IOC as part of the total medal count.

In architecture, no gold medal was awarded while the silver was awarded to the pair of Alfréd Hajós and Dezső Lauber of Hungary. Hajós became one of only two Olympians ever to have won medals in both sport (two golds in swimming at the 1896 Summer Olympics) and art Olympic competitions. The bronze was awarded to Julien Médecin of Monaco, who became the first Monégasque competitor to win an Olympic medal. (Note: No longer recognized by the IOC as part of the total medal count)

In literature, one gold, which was awarded to Géo-Charles of France, two silvers to Josef Petersen of Denmark and Margaret Stuart of Great Britain, and two bronzes to Charles Gonnet of France and Oliver Gogarty of Ireland, were awarded. Two compositions, entitled "The Land Where the Rose is Grown" and "O Vigila (now let the games begin)", that were part of the literature competition, were also part of the music competitions. The compositions were made by George Bamber of Great Britain, though no medals were awarded in the music competition as the jury could not reach a consensus to award medals for any of the competitors.

In painting, Jean Jacoby of Luxembourg won the gold medal, becoming the first Luxembourgish competitor to win an Olympic gold medal, (Note: This event is no longer recognized by the IOC as part of the total medal count. Luxembourgish-born Michel Théato won the men's marathon at the 1900 Summer Olympics, but is credited as a French competitor without having applied for French citizenship. Josy Barthel won the nation's first official gold medal, winning the men's 1500 metres event at the 1952 Summer Olympics.) Jack Butler Yeats of Ireland won the silver, becoming the first Irish competitor to win an Olympic medal, and Johan van Hell of the Netherlands won the bronze.

In sculpture, Konstantinos Dimitriadis of Greece won the gold medal, Frantz Heldenstein of Luxembourg won the silver, and two bronze medals were awarded, one to Jean René Gauguin of Denmark and the other to Claude-Léon Mascaux of France.

== Legacy ==
The 1924 Summer Olympics was the second edition of the Summer Olympics to be held in Paris. 100 years later, the city has hosted the games once again with the 2024 Summer Olympics, marking its third time, becoming the second city ever to host the Summer Olympics three times (after London, which hosted the 1908, 1948, and 2012 Games). Paris 2024 also marks the centenary of Chamonix 1924, which in turn marks the centenary of the Winter Olympics; making Paris 2024 the sixth Olympic Games hosted by France (three Summer Olympics and three Winter Olympics), and the first French Olympics since the 1992 Winter Games in Albertville.

Notable debuts of participating countries for the Paris 1924 Olympics include Ireland, Latvia, Lithuania, Philippines, Poland, Romania, and Uruguay; all of which celebrated their centenary participation at the 2024 Summer Olympics back in Paris.

One venue from the 1924 Games was used in the 2024 Games. The extensively renovated and downsized main stadium, known since 1928 as Stade Olympique Yves-du-Manoir, hosted field hockey.

The last surviving competitor of the 1924 Summer Olympics was Croatian swimmer Ivo Pavelić, who died on 22 February 2011 at the age of 103; he competed for Yugoslavia, which Croatia was part of at the time.

Continuation of Jeux de L’Enfance, games for youth sports and competition, from the Paris 1924 was embodied through the creation of Youth Olympics Games inaugurating in Singapore with the 2010 Summer Youth Olympics with 3,600 athletes aged 14–18 from 204 nations competing in 201 events in 26 sports.

== See also ==
- 1924 Winter Olympics
- Olympic Games held in France
  - 1900 Summer Olympics – Paris
  - 1924 Summer Olympics – Paris
  - 1924 Winter Olympics – Chamonix
  - 1968 Winter Olympics – Grenoble
  - 1992 Winter Olympics – Albertville
  - 2024 Summer Olympics – Paris
  - 2030 Winter Olympics – French Alps
- List of IOC country codes
- Chariots of Fire

== Notes ==
Summer Olympics
Preceded by Antwerp	VIII Olympiad; Paris; 1924	Succeeded by Amsterdam
