= Roller hockey at the 1992 Summer Olympics – Squads and statistics =

Below are listed the squad constitutions for every nation which presented a team to the roller hockey competition at the 1992 Summer Olympics. Along with the rosters are also displayed total statistics per player and some general competition statistics.

== Angola ==
	Coach: João B. de Abreu
No.	Name	Pos.	GOALS
No.	Name	Pos.	Total	Shots	%
1	Jorge Bachiessa	GK	0	0	0
2	A. D. Fernandes	DF	0	33	0
3	Vado de Carvalho	MF	1	30	3
4	Nando Bendinha	DF	0	3	0
5	Né Santos	FW	1	20	5
6	Miguel L. Pataca	DF	0	3	0
7	Sony Amado	DF	2	74	3
8 (C)	Orlando Graça	FW	1	44	2
9	Tota Monteiro	DF	2	47	4
10	Inácio F. Olim	GK	0	0	0
TOTAL			7	254	3

Opponent	GOALS						Assists	Steals	Turnovers	Fouls
Opponent	Total	Area	Side	Centre	Penalty	Foul direct	Assists	Steals	Turnovers	Fouls
Group B
Netherlands	3	1	2	0	0	0	1	9	17	28
Brazil	1	0	0	1	0	0	0	17	19	30
Australia	2	1	1	0	0	0	1	9	13	21
Germany	1	1	0	0	0	0	1	18	27	45
Spain	0	0	0	0	0	0	0	12	39	21
TOTAL	7	3	3	1	0	0	3	65	115	145

== Argentina ==
	Coach: Miguel Gomez Garcia
No.	Name	Pos.	GOALS
No.	Name	Pos.	Total	Shots	%
1	G. Herrmann Serra	GK	0	0	0
2	A. Cairo Valdivia	FW	1	11	9
3 (C)	P. Cairo Valdivia	MF	8	105	8
4	J. Paez Picon	FW	10	109	9
5	D. Allende Martinez	DF	6	53	11
6	G. Cairo Valdivia	FW	6	46	13
7	R. Monserrat Barragan	MF	2	25	8
8	A. Rodriguez Crespo	DF	2	65	3
9	R. Roldan Gomez	FW	13	146	9
10	A. Bridge Moreno	GK	0	0	0
TOTAL			48	560	9

Opponent	GOALS						Assists	Steals	Turnovers	Fouls
Opponent	Total	Area	Side	Centre	Penalty	Foul direct	Assists	Steals	Turnovers	Fouls
Group A
Italy	3	2	1	0	0	0	2	14	11	27
United States	4	2	1	1	0	0	1	19	22	20
Portugal	0	0	0	0	0	0	0	17	24	51
Japan	13	10	1	2	0	0	3	14	19	16
Switzerland	2	2	0	0	0	0	2	9	16	26
Semi-finals
Spain	2	1	0	1	0	0	0	20	17	37
Portugal	2	2	0	0	0	0	1	4	37	44
Brazil	3	3	0	0	0	0	2	9	13	16
Italy	7	4	0	3	0	0	1	13	37	27
Netherlands	4	2	0	2	0	0	1	15	29	28
Gold Medal Final
Spain	8	6	0	2	0	0	1	19	36	40
TOTAL	48	34	3	11	0	0	14	153	261	332

== Australia ==
	Coach: Desmond R. Carter
No.	Name	Pos.	GOALS
No.	Name	Pos.	Total	Shots	%
1	John Stanley Barr	GK	0	0	0
2	Nicholas J. Galtos	DF	3	37	8
3	Shane Alan Simpson	FW	0	36	0
4	E. S. Connolly	FW	0	15	0
5 (C)	C. Peter Raggett	MF	0	24	0
6	Keith John Reinke	DF	4	80	5
7	Brett A. Phillpot	MF	0	33	0
8	B. Mark Emberson	MF	0	12	0
9	Claudio A. Munoz	FW	0	2	0
10	Scott J. Wilson	GK	0	0	0
TOTAL			7	239	3

Opponent	GOALS						Assists	Steals	Turnovers	Fouls
Opponent	Total	Area	Side	Centre	Penalty	Foul direct	Assists	Steals	Turnovers	Fouls
Group B
Spain	1	0	0	1	0	0	0	6	29	16
Germany	1	0	1	0	0	0	0	14	23	31
Angola	0	0	0	0	0	0	0	10	16	33
Netherlands	1	1	0	0	0	0	1	13	27	54
Brazil	4	3	1	0	0	0	1	16	28	26
TOTAL	7	4	2	1	0	0	2	59	123	160

== Brazil ==
	Coach: Yader Torlay
No.	Name	Pos.	GOALS
No.	Name	Pos.	Total	Shots	%
1	R. Miranda Caribe	GK	0	0	0
2	A. Cavallaro	DF	0	11	0
3	M. Barbosa Duque	MF	0	40	0
4	F. Louzada de Jesus	MF	3	52	6
5 (C)	V. Nogueira Santos	FW	7	64	11
6	Jurandir Silva	FW	14	129	11
7	Alan Feres Karam	FW	9	88	10
8	Flávio Pontes Guidi	DF	0	19	0
9	M. Cavallaro	FW	6	55	11
10	F. Nogueira Mainardi	GK	0	0	0
TOTAL			39	458	9

Opponent	GOALS						Assists	Steals	Turnovers	Fouls
Opponent	Total	Area	Side	Centre	Penalty	Foul direct	Assists	Steals	Turnovers	Fouls
Group B
Germany	5	3	0	1	1	0	1	17	18	37
Angola	8	5	2	0	0	1	1	18	22	29
Netherlands	6	4	1	1	0	0	2	16	23	62
Spain	1	1	0	0	0	0	0	9	22	36
Australia	7	4	2	1	0	0	0	20	19	32
Semi-finals
Netherlands	5	4	1	0	0	0	2	9	32	26
Italy	1	1	0	0	0	0	0	17	24	30
Argentina	1	1	0	0	0	0	0	8	13	27
Spain	3	3	0	0	0	0	1	14	21	16
Portugal	2	2	0	0	0	0	1	12	34	15
TOTAL	39	28	6	3	1	1	8	140	228	310

== Germany ==
	Coach: Hanswerner Meier
No.	Name	Pos.	GOALS
No.	Name	Pos.	Total	Shots	%
1 (C)	Hans-Peter Scheunemann	GK	0	0	0
2	Wolfgang Weber	DF	0	11	0
3	Ulrich Pfeifer	DF	1	24	4
4	Ralf Giesen	DF	2	21	10
5	Markus Franken	FW	4	40	10
6	Andreas Thiel	FW	3	38	8
7	Bernt Schiffmann	DF	0	5	0
8	Michael Koch	FW	0	27	0
9	Michael Neubauer	FW	3	42	7
10	Armin Heddenhausen	GK	0	0	0
TOTAL			13	208	6

Opponent	GOALS						Assists	Steals	Turnovers	Fouls
Opponent	Total	Area	Side	Centre	Penalty	Foul direct	Assists	Steals	Turnovers	Fouls
Group B
Brazil	3	2	1	0	0	0	0	15	21	44
Australia	4	2	1	1	0	0	0	16	18	35
Spain	1	1	0	1	0	0	0	7	29	35
Angola	2	2	0	0	0	0	1	20	24	49
Netherlands	3	2	1	0	0	0	2	7	20	60
TOTAL	13	9	3	2	0	0	3	65	112	223

== Italy ==
	Coach: Giambattista Massari
No.	Name	Pos.	GOALS
No.	Name	Pos.	Total	Shots	%
1	Alessandro Cupisti	GK	0	1	0
2 (C)	Tommaso Colamaria	DF	1	21	5
3	Francesco Amato	DF	32	153	21
4	Enrico Bernardini	MF	8	52	15
5	Roberto Crudeli	MF	5	64	8
6	Massimo Mariotti	FW	15	129	12
7	Enrico Mariotti	FW	8	88	9
8	Dario Rigo	FW	4	19	21
9	Giuseppe Marzella	FW	5	55	9
10	Massimo Cunegatti	GK	0	0	0
TOTAL			78	582	13

Opponent	GOALS						Assists	Steals	Turnovers	Fouls
Opponent	Total	Area	Side	Centre	Penalty	Foul direct	Assists	Steals	Turnovers	Fouls
Group A
Argentina	3	1	1	0	1	0	1	14	14	16
Switzerland	8	7	1	0	0	0	4	20	21	25
United States	13	13	0	0	0	0	6	22	23	21
Portugal	5	4	0	1	0	0	2	8	24	20
Japan	25	19	4	2	0	0	10	28	10	8
Semi-finals
Portugal	3	0	0	3	0	0	0	17	22	39
Brazil	6	6	0	0	0	0	2	23	23	28
Netherlands	8	6	0	2	0	0	3	20	15	23
Argentina	3	1	0	1	1	0	0	24	26	44
Spain	1	1	0	0	0	0	0	13	31	30
Bronze Medal Final
Portugal	3	2	0	1	0	0	0	18	30	42
TOTAL	78	60	6	10	2	0	28	207	239	296

== Japan ==
	Coach: Kioichi Nishimura
No.	Name	Pos.	GOALS
No.	Name	Pos.	Total	Shots	%
1	Katsumi Yamada	GK	0	0	0
2 (C)	Nobuyuki Kijima	DF	1	24	4
3	Shoji Nishimura	FW	0	7	0
4	Koji Tamura	DF	0	23	0
5	Hitoshi Fukuda	FW	1	10	10
6	Kimio Yamane	DF	0	2	0
7	Masahiko Onodera	DF	0	33	0
8	Noburu Kawaji	FW	2	18	11
9	Koichi Iguchi	FW	0	3	0
10	Fumitake Hatsuse	GK	0	0	0
TOTAL			4	120	3

Opponent	GOALS						Assists	Steals	Turnovers	Fouls
Opponent	Total	Area	Side	Centre	Penalty	Foul direct	Assists	Steals	Turnovers	Fouls
Group A
United States	1	1	0	0	0	0	0	8	47	7
Portugal	0	0	0	0	0	0	0	16	85	11
Switzerland	2	2	0	0	0	0	1	11	20	21
Argentina	0	0	0	0	0	0	0	17	19	6
Italy	1	0	0	1	0	0	0	11	54	8
TOTAL	4	3	0	1	0	0	1	63	225	53

== Netherlands ==
21* * * * * * *

	Coach: Jack van Lieshout
No.	Name	Pos.	GOALS
No.	Name	Pos.	Total	Shots	%
1	Franklyn Hartkamp	GK	0	1	0
2	Marcel Lugtenburg	DF	2	46	4
3	T. van den Dungen	DF	3	104	3
4	Hans Maranus	DF	2	10	20
5	J. van Diejen	DF	2	36	6
6	Patrick Zwaanswijk	FW	3	84	4
7	Arjan Vangerven	FW	8	95	8
8 (C)	Ronald Grijseels	MF	3	36	8
9	Remon Lugtenburg	FW	5	76	7
10	Wibo van Lieshout	GK	0	0	0
TOTAL			28	488	6

Opponent	GOALS						Assists	Steals	Turnovers	Fouls
Opponent	Total	Area	Side	Centre	Penalty	Foul direct	Assists	Steals	Turnovers	Fouls
Group B
Angola	3	0	1	2	0	0	0	10	14	34
Spain	1	1	0	0	0	0	0	7	26	38
Brazil	2	1	1	0	0	0	1	16	25	44
Australia	12	9	0	2	1	0	3	12	22	35
Germany	5	5	0	0	0	0	2	15	16	50
Semi-finals
Brazil	0	0	0	0	0	0	0	21	23	22
Spain	1	1	0	0	0	0	1	14	27	34
Italy	1	1	0	0	0	0	0	18	32	43
Portugal	2	2	0	0	0	0	2	22	38	40
Argentina	1	1	0	0	0	0	0	20	27	17
TOTAL	28	21	2	4	1	0	9	155	250	357

== Portugal ==
	Coach: António Livramento
No.	Name	Pos.	GOALS
No.	Name	Pos.	Total	Shots	%
1	António Heitor	GK	0	0	0
2	Rui Lopes	FW	4	24	17
3	Luís Ferreira	FW	14	144	10
4 (C)	Vítor Hugo	FW	10	87	11
5	António Neves	FW	24	79	30
6	Vitor Fortunato	DF	5	45	11
7	Paulo Alves	DF	9	229	4
8	Pedro Alves	DF	9	64	14
9	Paulo Almeida	DF	8	57	14
10	Franklin Pais	GK	0	0	0
TOTAL			83	729	11

Opponent	GOALS						Assists	Steals	Turnovers	Fouls
Opponent	Total	Area	Side	Centre	Penalty	Foul direct	Assists	Steals	Turnovers	Fouls
Group A
Switzerland	11	8	1	2	0	0	4	25	17	33
Japan	38	34	2	2	0	0	19	30	19	11
Argentina	1	1	0	0	0	0	0	15	16	30
Italy	2	1	0	1	0	0	0	6	18	28
United States	7	5	0	2	0	0	3	27	24	22
Semi-finals
Italy	5	3	1	1	0	0	1	18	19	30
Argentina	1	0	0	1	0	0	0	30	15	33
Spain	1	1	0	0	0	0	1	16	19	55
Netherlands	7	6	1	0	0	0	0	31	28	25
Brazil	8	6	0	2	0	0	2	29	17	19
Bronze Medal Final
Italy	2	2	0	0	0	0	0	23	21	48
TOTAL	83	67	5	11	0	0	30	250	213	334

== Spain ==
	Coach: C. J. Trullols Clemente
No.	Name	Pos.	GOALS
No.	Name	Pos.	Total	Shots	%
1	R. Canalda Boada	GK	0	0	0
2	Joan Carles Colas	DF	14	105	13
3 (C)	Joan Ayats Presas	FW	9	86	10
4	A. Rovira Lecha	FW	12	97	12
5	F. Pujalte Camarasa	DF	6	142	4
6	J. Benito Martinez	FW	7	40	18
7	A. Avecilla Porto	FW	14	90	16
8	S. Carda Torner	DF	7	112	6
9	R. Peralta Rabade	DF	1	12	8
10	C. Folguera Felip	GK	0	0	0
TOTAL			70	684	10

Opponent	GOALS						Assists	Steals	Turnovers	Fouls
Opponent	Total	Area	Side	Centre	Penalty	Foul direct	Assists	Steals	Turnovers	Fouls
Group B
Australia	17	12	3	1	0	1	5	20	15	23
Netherlands	11	8	1	2	0	0	4	17	11	39
Germany	5	4	1	0	0	0	3	20	19	36
Brazil	2	1	0	1	0	0	0	13	12	19
Angola	10	7	2	1	0	0	4	28	15	23
Semi-finals
Argentina	3	1	0	1	0	1	0	16	24	33
Netherlands	5	5	0	0	0	0	0	25	21	43
Portugal	3	3	0	0	0	0	1	16	17	51
Brazil	3	2	0	1	0	0	1	14	18	27
Italy	5	4	0	1	0	0	1	28	20	33
Gold Medal Final
Argentina	6	6	0	0	0	0	2	29	27	37
TOTAL	70	53	7	8	0	2	21	226	199	364

== Switzerland ==
	Coach: Jaime Cardoso
No.	Name	Pos.	GOALS
No.	Name	Pos.	Total	Shots	%
1	Markus Steudler	GK	0	0	0
2	Patrik Roduit	DF	2	58	3
3 (C)	Gerald Brentini	DF	0	48	0
4	Jean-Luc Christen	MF	1	17	6
5	Stephane Cotting	MF	2	9	22
6	Alain Richard	FW	4	44	9
7	Rolf Luethi	FW	0	3	0
8	Gilles Brentini	FW	3	35	9
9	Raphael Ruschetta	FW	0	2	0
10	Regis Chevalley	GK	0	0	0
TOTAL			12	216	6

Opponent	GOALS						Assists	Steals	Turnovers	Fouls
Opponent	Total	Area	Side	Centre	Penalty	Foul direct	Assists	Steals	Turnovers	Fouls
Group A
Switzerland	0	0	0	0	0	0	0	11	37	13
Italy	0	0	0	0	0	0	0	17	32	18
Japan	9	5	2	2	0	0	4	17	21	27
United States	2	2	0	0	0	0	0	19	38	19
Argentina	1	1	0	0	0	0	0	10	18	17
TOTAL	12	8	2	2	0	0	4	74	146	94

== United States ==
	Coach: Ruben H. Leni
No.	Name	Pos.	GOALS
No.	Name	Pos.	Total	Shots	%
1	Plim Howard	GK	0	0	0
2	Jim Trussell	DF	4	49	8
3	Jeffrey Gibson	DF	5	23	22
4	Keith Huckaby	MF	3	21	14
5	Johnny Raglin	FW	2	20	10
6	Mike Stevenson	FW	5	23	22
7 (C)	Dickie Chado	FW	2	49	4
8	Brady Donoghue	FW	1	16	6
9	Karl Huckaby	FW	2	44	5
10	David W. Jones	GK	0	0	0
TOTAL			24	245	10

Opponent	GOALS						Assists	Steals	Turnovers	Fouls
Opponent	Total	Area	Side	Centre	Penalty	Foul direct	Assists	Steals	Turnovers	Fouls
Group A
Japan	10	7	2	1	0	0	5	23	18	22
Argentina	4	2	1	1	0	0	2	24	17	37
Italy	2	2	0	0	0	0	0	21	30	29
Switzerland	5	3	2	0	0	0	1	34	25	23
Portugal	3	3	0	0	0	0	2	17	28	25
TOTAL	24	17	5	2	0	0	10	119	118	136

== General statistics ==
=== Players ===
- Top scorers:

1. Francesco Amato (ITA) – 32
2. António Neves (POR) – 24
3. Massimo Mariotti (ITA) – 15

- Shots:

1. Paulo Alves (POR) – 229
2. Francesco Amato (ITA) – 153
3. R. Roldan Gomez (ARG) – 146

- Efficiency (% goals):

1. António Neves (POR) – 30
2. Jeffrey Gibson (USA) – 22 (5 goals)
3. Mike Stevenson (USA) – 22 (5 goals)

=== Teams ===
- Top scorers:

1. Portugal – 83
2. Italy – 78
3. Spain – 70

- Shots:

1. Portugal – 729
2. Spain – 684
3. Italy – 582

- Efficiency (% goals):

1. Italy – 13
2. Portugal – 11
3. Spain – 10

- Assists:

1. Portugal – 30
2. Italy – 28
3. Spain – 21

- Steals:

1. Portugal – 250
2. Spain – 226
3. Italy – 207

- Turnovers:

1. Argentina – 261
2. Netherlands – 250
3. Italy – 239

- Fouls:

1. Spain – 364
2. Netherlands – 357
3. Portugal – 334

=== Others ===
- Most goals in a match – 38 (Japan 0–38 Portugal)
- Most goals by a player in a match – 16 → António Neves (POR) (Japan 0–38 Portugal)
- Most goals by a team in a match – 38 (Japan 0–38 Portugal)
- Biggest goal difference in a match – 38 (Japan 0–38 Portugal)

== See also ==
- Roller hockey at the 1992 Summer Olympics - Preliminary round
- Roller hockey at the 1992 Summer Olympics - Semi-finals
