= List of Summer Olympics venues: P =

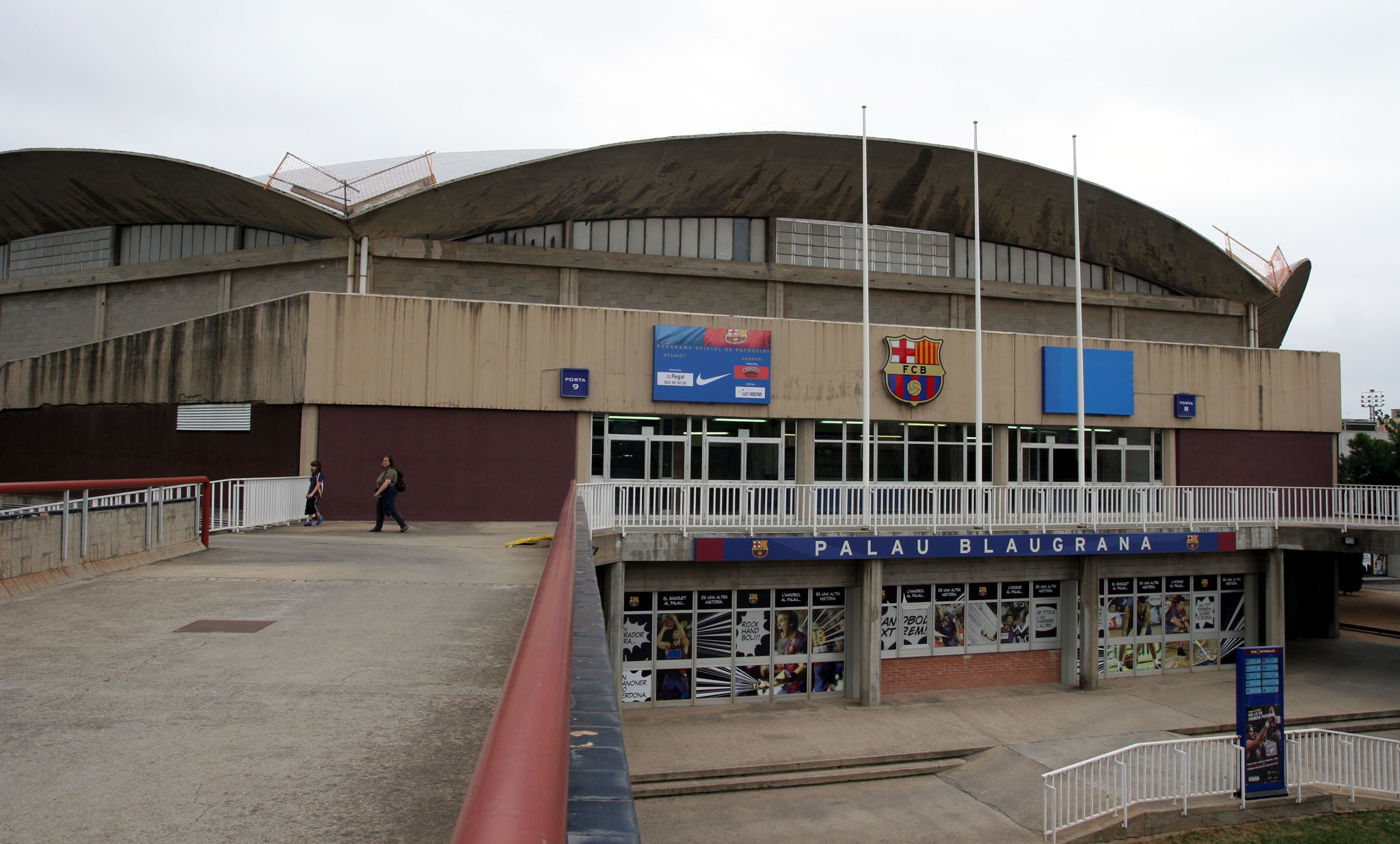
Palau Blaugrana hosted the judo, roller hockey, and taekwondo events for the 1992 Summer Olympics in Barcelona.

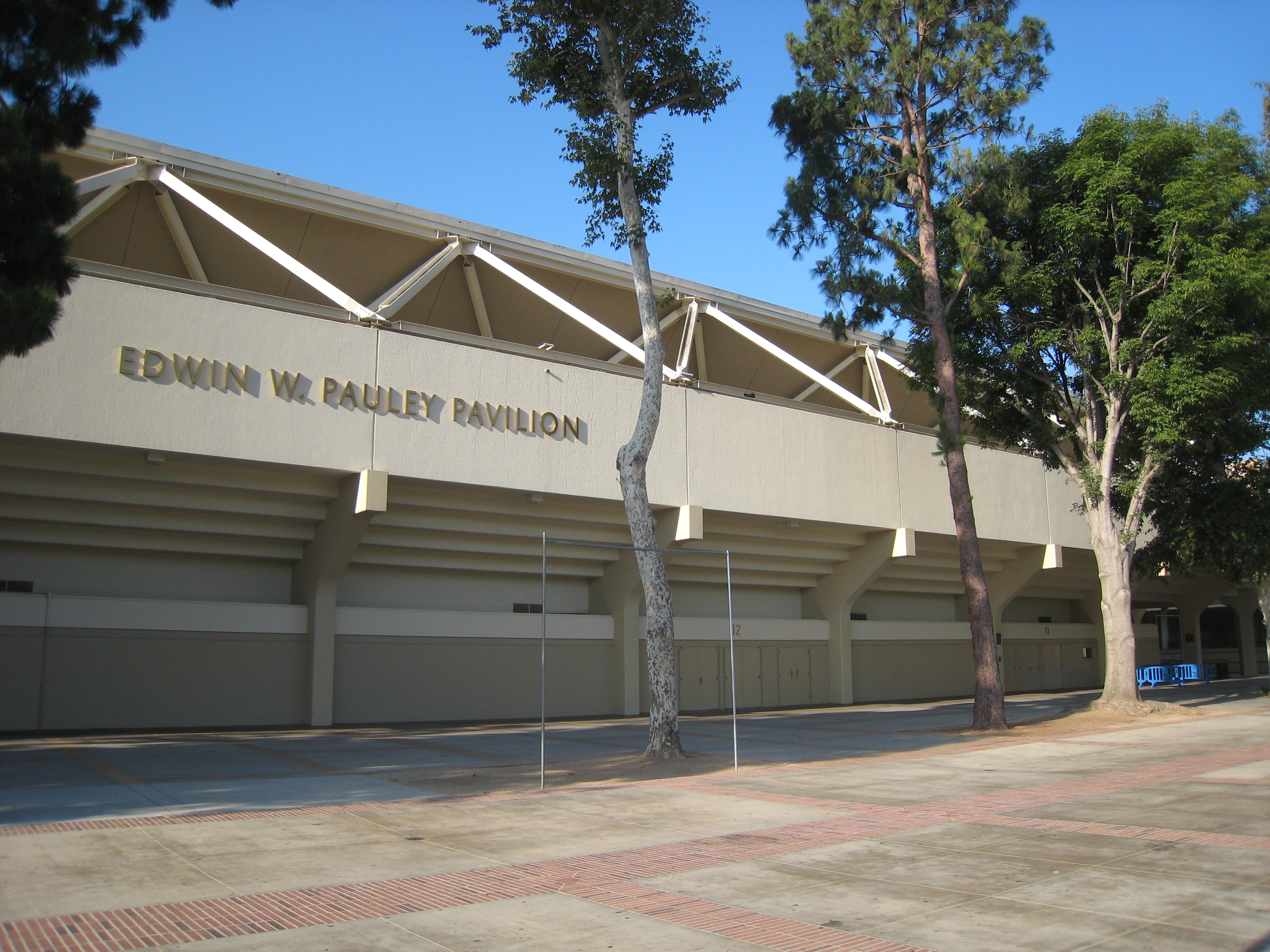
Pauley Pavilion on the University of California, Los Angeles campus. For the 1984 Summer Olympics, the venue hosted gymnastics events.

For the Summer Olympics, a total of 50 venues starting with the letter 'P'.

Venue	Games	Sports	Capacity	Ref.
Pacific Coast Highway	1932 Los Angeles	Cycling (road)	Not listed.	
Pakila	1952 Helsinki	Cycling (road)	Not listed.	
Palais de Glace d'Anvers	1920 Antwerp	Figure skating, Ice hockey	Not listed.	
Palau Blaugrana	1992 Barcelona	Judo, Roller hockey (demonstration final), Taekwondo (demonstration)	6,400	
Palau de la Metal·lúrgia	1992 Barcelona	Fencing, Modern pentathlon (fencing)	Not listed.	
Palau dels Esports de Barcelona	1992 Barcelona	Gymnastics (rhythmic), Volleyball	8,000	
Palau D'Esports de Granollers	1992 Barcelona	Handball	5,500	
Palau Sant Jordi	1992 Barcelona	Gymnastics (artistic), Handball (final), Volleyball (final)	15,000	
Palazzo dei Congressi	1960 Rome	Fencing, Modern pentathlon (fencing)	Not listed.	
Palazzo dello Sport	1960 Rome	Basketball (final), Boxing	15,000	
Palazzetto dello sport	1960 Rome	Basketball, Weightlifting	Not listed.	
Pampeloponnisiako Stadium	2004 Athens	Football	20,000	
Panathenaic Stadium	1896 Athens	Athletics, Gymnastics, Weightlifting, and Wrestling	80,000	
Panathenaic Stadium	2004 Athens	Archery, Athletics (marathon finish)	7,500 (archery); 34,500 (athletics marathon finish)	
Pankritio Stadium	2004 Athens	Football	98,000	
Panthessaliko Stadium	2004 Athens	Football	98,000	
Parc Olímpic del Segre	1992 Barcelona	Canoeing (slalom)	2,500	
Parnitha Olympic Mountain Bike Venue	2004 Athens	Cycling (mountain biking)	Not listed.	
Passo Corese	1960 Rome	Modern pentathlon (riding)	Not listed.	
Paul Sauvé Centre	1976 Montreal	Volleyball	4,000	
Pauley Pavilion	1984 Los Angeles	Gymnastics	12,829	
Pavelló Club Joventut Badalona	1992 Barcelona	Boxing	Not listed.	
Pavelló de la Mar Bella	1992 Barcelona	Badminton	4,000	
Pavelló de l'Ateneu de Sant Sadurní	1992 Barcelona	Roller hockey (demonstration)	1,300	
Pavelló de la Vall d'Hebron	1992 Barcelona	Basque pelota (demonstration), Volleyball	2,500 (volleyball); 3,300 (basque pelota)	
Pavelló del Club Patí Vic	1992 Barcelona	Roller hockey (demonstration)	1,700	
Pavelló de l'Espanya Industrial	1992 Barcelona	Weightlifting	Not listed.	
Pavelló d'Esports de Reus	1992 Barcelona	Roller hockey (demonstration)	3,000	
Pavelló Olímpic de Badalona	1992 Barcelona	Basketball	12,500	
Pavilion de l'éducation physique et des sports de l'Université Laval	1976 Montreal	Handball	3,732	
Peace and Friendship Stadium	2004 Athens	Volleyball (indoor)	Not listed.	
Peking University Gymnasium	2008 Beijing	Table tennis	8,000	
Penrith Whitewater Stadium	2000 Sydney	Canoeing (slalom)	12,500	
Peristeri Olympic Boxing Hall	2004 Athens	Boxing	5,600	
Pescara Adriatic Stadium	1960 Rome	Football	24,400	
Piazza di Siena	1960 Rome	Equestrian (dressage, eventing dressage/ jumping, jumping individual)	15,000	
Piscina delle Rose	1960 Rome	Water polo	1,850	
Piscina Municipal de Montjuïc	1992 Barcelona	Diving, Water polo	6,500	
Piscines Bernat Picornell	1992 Barcelona	Modern pentathlon (swimming), Swimming, Synchronized swimming, Water polo (final)	10,000	
Piscine des Tourelles	1924 Paris	Diving, Modern pentathlon (swimming), Swimming, Water polo	8,023	
Police Stadium	1936 Berlin	Handball	Not listed.	
Polytechnic Sports Ground	1948 London	Field hockey	Not listed.	
Port Phillip	1956 Melbourne	Sailing	Not listed	
Portsmouth Olympic Harbour	1976 Montreal	Sailing	Not listed	
Poststadion	1936 Berlin	Football	45,000.	
Prado Regional Park	1984 Los Angeles	Shooting	5,000	
Pratoni del Vivaro	1960 Rome	Equestrian (eventing)	Not listed.	
Prince Chichiba Memorial Football Field	1964 Tokyo	Football	17,600	
Prince's Skating Club	1908 London	Figure skating	Not listed.	
Puteaux	1900 Paris	Tennis	Not listed	
