= Venues of the 1992 Summer Olympics =

Facilities in the Montjuïc area. Navigate the map for other facilities.

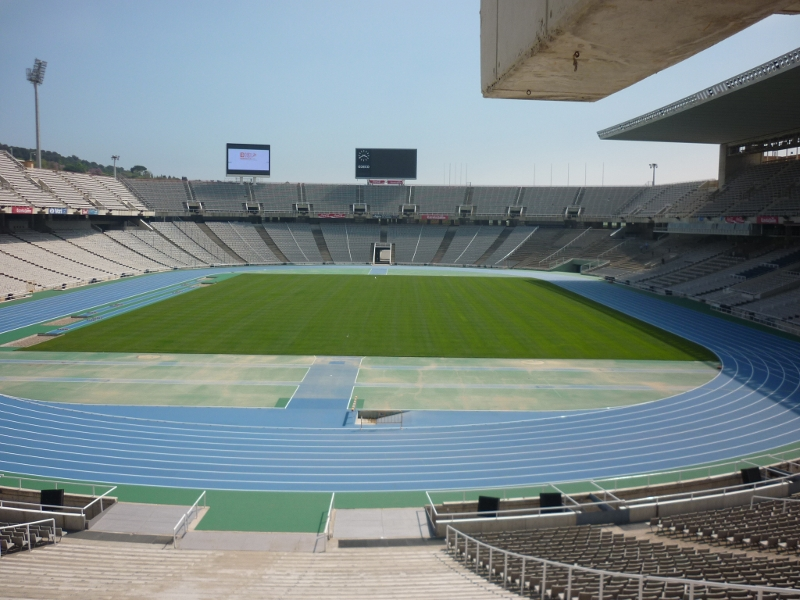
The Olympic Stadium after the 2010 remodeling for the European Athletics Championships. It hosted the athletic and ceremonies (opening/closing) for the 1992 Summer Olympics.

For the 1992 Summer Olympics in Barcelona, a total of forty-three sports venues were used.

Barcelona's first bid for the Summer Olympics was the 1924 Games, losing to Paris. The city tried again in 1936, losing to Berlin. The city subsequently planned to host the People's Olympiad in that year, as a protest against holding the Olympics in Nazi Germany, but were forced to cancel the event because of the outbreak of the Spanish Civil War. Following their success of hosting the Mediterranean Games in 1955, Barcelona would try again to host the Summer Olympics, this time seeking the 1972 Games and losing out to Munich. Montjuïc Stadium, built in 1927–9, would be refurbished during the mid to late 1980s in Barcelona's effort to win the 1992 Summer Olympics, which they did in October 1986.

Barcelona's involvement in motorsport included the street circuit at Montjuïc, used for both Formula One and MotoGP from 1950 to 1976, and the Circuit de Catalunya, completed in 1991. The former street circuit had one Olympic venue inside its circuit and two others located south and adjacent to it. Circuit de Catalunya would serve as the start and finish line area for the cycling road team time trial event. The marathon course was a relatively flat one until the final 4.695 km (2.92 mi) where it was an uphill climb to the Olympic Stadium. Complaints about garbage in the water near the sailing venue forced the Barcelona Port Authority to have four garbage vessels pick up the garbage on a daily basis.

Three Olympic venues served as host of the World Aquatic Championships in 2003 and 2013. The Circuit de Catalunya continues to be host for Formula One after the Olympics and MotoGP since 1996. Olympic Stadium hosted the European Athletics Championships in 2010.

== Venues ==
=== Montjuïc Area ===
Venue	Sports	Capacity	Ref.
Cross-country course	Modern pentathlon (running)	Not listed.	
Estadi Olímpic de Monjuïc	Athletics; Ceremonies (opening/closing)	60,000	
Institut National d'Educació Física de Catalunya	Wrestling	4,000	
Marathon course	Athletics (marathon)	Not listed.	
Mataró	Athletics (marathon start)	Not listed.	
Palau de la Metal·lúrgia	Fencing; Modern pentathlon (fencing)	3,500	
Palau dels Esports de Barcelona	Gymnastics (rhythmic); Volleyball	8,000	
Palau Sant Jordi	Gymnastics (artistic); Handball (final); Volleyball (final)	15,000	
Pavelló de l'Espanya Industrial	Weightlifting	Not listed.	
Piscina Municipal de Montjuïc	Diving; Water polo	6,500	
Piscines Bernat Picornell	Modern pentathlon (swimming); Swimming; Synchronized swimming Water polo (final)	10,700	
Walking course	Athletics (race walks)	Not listed.	

=== Diagonal Area ===
Venue	Sports	Capacity	Ref.
Camp Nou	Football	100,000	
Palau Blaugrana	Judo; Roller hockey (demonstration final); Taekwondo (demonstration)	6,400	
Estadi de Sarrià	Football	42,000	
Real Club de Polo de Barcelona	Equestrian (dressage, jumping, eventing final); Modern pentathlon (riding)	9,600	

=== Vall d'Hebron Area ===
Venue	Sports	Capacity	Ref.
Camp Olímpic de Tir amb Arc	Archery	Not listed.	
Pavelló de la Vall d'Hebron	Basque pelota (demonstration); Volleyball	2,500 (volleyball); 3,300 (basque pelota)	
Tennis de la Vall d'Hebron	Tennis	8,000	
Velòdrom d'Horta	Cycling (track)	6,400	

=== Parc de Mar Area ===
Venue	Sports	Capacity	Ref.
Estació del Nord Sports Hall	Table tennis	5,500	
Olympic Harbour	Sailing	Not listed.	
Pavelló de la Mar Bella	Badminton	4,000	

=== Subsites ===
Venue	Sports	Capacity	Ref.
A-17 highway	Cycling (road team time trial)	105,000	
Banyoles Lake	Rowing	4,500	
Camp Municipal de Beisbol de Viladecans	Baseball	4,000	
Canal Olímpic de Catalunya	Canoeing (sprint)	8,000	
Circuit de Catalunya	Cycling (road team time trial)	2,000	
Club Hípic El Montayá	Equestrian (dressage, eventing endurance)	3,400	
Estadi de la Nova Creu Alta (Sabadell)	Football	16,000	
Estadi Olímpic de Terrassa	Field hockey	10,200	
Estadio Luís Casanova (Valencia)	Football	50,000	
La Romareda (Zaragoza)	Football	43,000	
L'Hospitalet de Llobregat Baseball Stadium	Baseball (final)	7,000	
Mollet del Vallès Shooting Range	Modern pentathlon (shooting); Shooting	1,400	
Palau D'Esports de Granollers	Handball	5,500	
Parc Olímpic del Segre	Canoeing (slalom)	2,500	
Pavelló Club Joventut Badalona	Boxing	5,500.	
Pavelló de l'Ateneu de Sant Sadurní	Roller hockey (demonstration)	1,300	
Pavelló del Club Patí Vic	Roller hockey (demonstration)	1,700	
Pavelló d'Esports de Reus	Roller hockey (demonstration)	3,000	
Pavelló Olímpic de Badalona	Basketball	12,500	
Sant Sadurní Cycling Circuit	Cycling (individual road race)	45,000	

== Before the Olympics ==
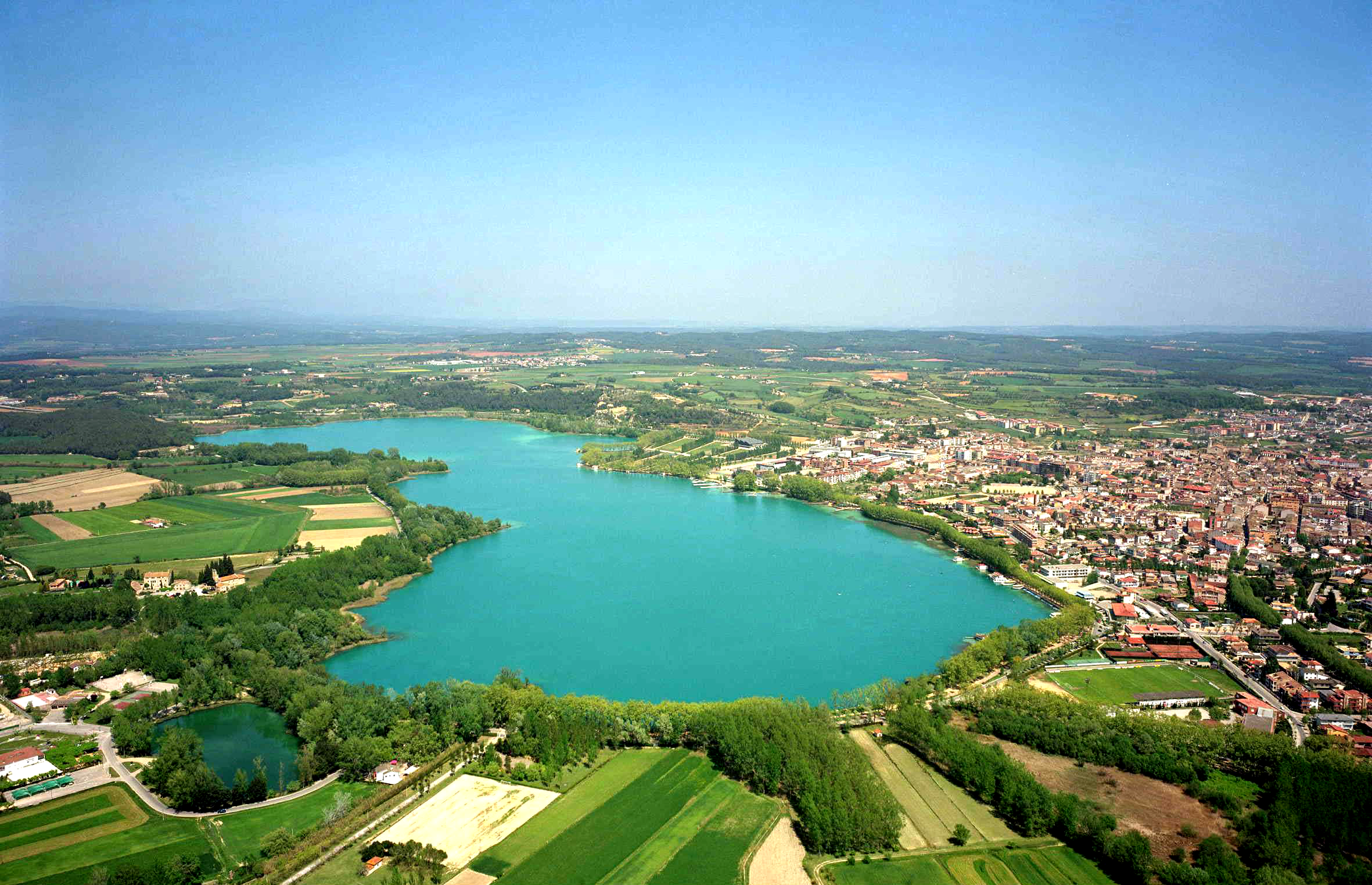
Lake Banyoles in 2005. The lake hosted the rowing events for the 1992 Summer Olympics.

The idea of Barcelona hosting the Olympic Games started as early as 1913. In 1924, the Spanish Olympic Committee was founded in Barcelona. During the reign of Francisco Franco, Barcelona hosted the men's Rink Hockey World Championship in 1951, 1954, and 1964, and the Mediterranean Games in 1955. The first bid for the Summer Olympics took place for 1924, losing to Paris, then tried again for the 1936 Games, losing to Berlin. Montjuïc Stadium had its first stone laid in 1927, as part of the International Exposition that took place in Barcelona two years later. Following Barcelona's success at the 1955 Mediterranean Games, the city made another attempt for the Summer Olympics for the 1972 Games in a joint bid with Madrid in 1966, but they lost out to eventual winner Munich.

After World War II, Barcelona started playing host to the Formula One auto and Grand Prix motorcycle racing. The first circuit used in Barcelona was at Pedralbes in 1951, where the inaugural race was won by Argentina's Juan Manuel Fangio. One more race was held at Pedralbes in 1954, won by Great Britain's Mike Hawthorn. Formula One would not return officially to Spain until 1968 though Barcelona's Montjuïc circuit would share duties hosting with Circuito del Jarama to 1975 with Monjuïc hosting in odd-numbered years. The 1975 race was won by Jochen Mass of West Germany. In the former circuit, the Palau dels Esports de Barcelona was constructed in the north part of the circuit as part of the 1955 Mediterranean Games. Montjuïc Stadium was located south of the circuit as was the Piscines Bernat Picornell. Montjuïc hosted the Spanish motorcycle Grand Prix annually from 1951 to 1968 and then in even-numbered years until 1976. Formula One did not return to Barcelona until 1991 with the opening of the Circuit de Catalunya near Barcelona that would be won by Britain's Nigel Mansell. The Brit also won the 1992 race, held twelve weeks before the venue was to be used for the 1992 Summer Olympics.

Spain hosted the FIFA World Cup in 1982. Both stadiums in Barcelona hosted football matches with Camp Nou (Estadi del FC Barcelona)'s most notable game being the semifinal between Poland and Italy while Estadi de Sarrià (RCD Espanyol Stadium) hosting all three Round 2 Group C matches, including the 3–2 match between Brazil and Italy. Two other stadiums used in the 1982 World Cup would later serve as football venues for the Summer Olympics ten years later. They would be Valencia's Estadio Luís Casanova and Zaragoza's La Romareda, both used for Group 5 Round 1 match play.

Even before selection of the 1992 Summer Olympics took place, Barcelona started working on the possible venues to be used in January 1985. This continued for all of the venues before the International Olympic Committee (IOC) announcement in October 1986. The venues to be used were among the items presented at the IOC meeting. Barcelona was selected on 17 October 1986 in Lausanne, Switzerland. Of the forty-three venues used for the Games, fifteen would be new while ten would be refurbished. The venues that were being worked on in 1985 were done by 1990 while the other ones needed would be built or refurbished between 1987 and May 1992.

== During the Olympics ==
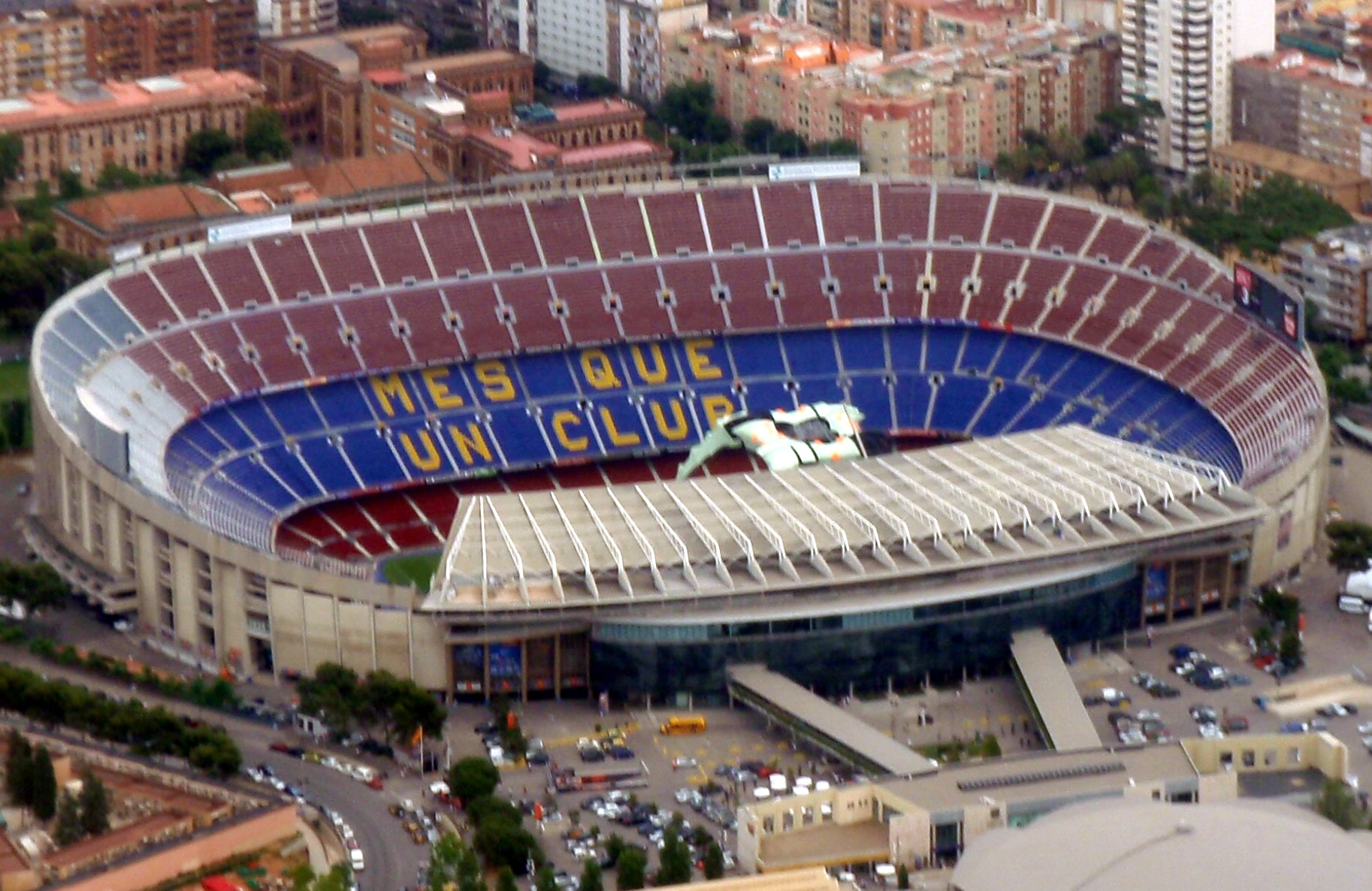
Aerial view of Camp Nou. It was known as Estadi del FC Barcelona for the 1992 Summer Olympics, hosting the football final.

The marathon course was run on a flat stretch of road for 37.5 km (23.3 mi) before having the final 4.695 km (2.92 mi) up Monjuïc to the Estadi Olímpic. In the men's race, South Korea's Hwang Young-cho and Japan's Koichi Morishita ran side-by-side toward the latter part of the race for 4 km (2.5 mi) before Hwang accelerated with 2 km (1.2 mi) left before the stadium and Morishita was unable to respond.

During the sailing competition, there were numerous complaints from the sailors over the debris found at the Olympic Harbor. Among the items found were dead rats and floating refrigerators. It was so bad that Barcelona port authorities, under pressure from the International Yacht Racing Union (World Sailing since 2015), assigned four garbage vessels to collect garbage daily. In the men's windsurfer event, American Mike Gebhardt got a plastic bag caught on his boardsail in the last lap of the seventh race. Six boardsailers passed Gebhardt before he could dislodge the plastic bag. Gebhardt lost out a gold by 0.4 points over France's Franck David.

== After the Olympics ==
Circuit de Catalunya has hosted the Spanish Grand Prix every year since the 1992 Games. In 1996, Grand Prix motorcycle racing (MotoGP) returned to Barcelona at the Circuit de Catalunya.

When the 2003 World Aquatics Championships were held in Barcelona, Palau Saint Jordi, Piscines Bernat Picornell, and Piscina Municipal de Montjuïc would be used as event venues. Ten years later, the same three venues hosted the World Aquatics Championships.

Estadi Olímpic de Montjuïc (now Estadi Olímpic Lluis Companys) hosted the European Athletics Championships in 2010.

Parc Olímpic del Segre hosted the ICF Canoe Slalom World Championships in 1999 and 2009.
