= Roller hockey at the 1992 Summer Olympics – Preliminary round =

The preliminary round of the 1992 Summer Olympics roller hockey competition was played between 26 and 30 July, consisting of a group stage with two groups of six teams. The teams were distributed into the groups based on the results at the 1991 Rink Hockey World Championship. Each group was contested at a specific venue and all teams in the same group played against each other one time for a total of 5 matches per team, one match per day. In the end, the best three teams qualified for the semi-finals.

== Group A ==
This group included teams from Argentina, Italy, Japan, Portugal, Switzerland and the United States. The matches were played at the Pavelló de Club Patí Vic, in Vic. The three qualified teams were Italy, Portugal and Argentina.

| Team | Pts | Pld | W | D | L | GF | GA |
|---|---|---|---|---|---|---|---|
| 1. Italy | 9 | 5 | 4 | 1 | 0 | 54 | 8 |
| 2. Portugal | 8 | 5 | 4 | 0 | 1 | 59 | 8 |
| 3. Argentina | 6 | 5 | 2 | 2 | 1 | 22 | 9 |
| 4. United States | 5 | 5 | 2 | 1 | 2 | 24 | 27 |
| 5. Switzerland | 2 | 5 | 1 | 0 | 4 | 12 | 28 |
| 6. Japan | 0 | 5 | 0 | 0 | 5 | 4 | 95 |

=== Matches ===
==== Day 1 ====
26 July 1992
| 26 July 1992 | United States | 10–1 (8–1) | Japan | Pavelló de Club Patí Vic; Vic |
| 26 July 1992 | Jeffrey Gibson (3); Jim Trussell (3); Johnny Raglin (2); Dickie Chado; Mike Stevenson | | Noburu Kawaji | Pavelló de Club Patí Vic; Vic |
| | Umpires: Carlos Freitas (ANG) & Ian Leslie Roach (AUS) |

26 July 1992
| 26 July 1992 | Italy | 3–3 (3–1) | Argentina | Pavelló de Club Patí Vic; Vic |
| 26 July 1992 | Dario Rigo; Francesco Amato; Massimo Mariotti | | G. Cairo Valdivia; J. Paez Picon; P. Cairo Valdivia | Pavelló de Club Patí Vic; Vic |
| | Umpires: Luís Alfredo Dias Rei (POR) & Udo Schaffhoefer (GER) |

26 July 1992
| 26 July 1992 | Portugal | 11–0 (5–0) | Switzerland | Pavelló de Club Patí Vic; Vic |
| 26 July 1992 | António Neves (2); Paulo Almeida (2); Paulo Alves (2); Pedro Alves (2); Luís Ferreira; Vitor Fortunato; Vitor Hugo Silva | | | Pavelló de Club Patí Vic; Vic |
| | Umpires: Joan Serrano Sala (ESP) & Horacio Ricardo Bernardez (ARG) |

==== Day 2 ====
27 July 1992
| 27 July 1992 | Switzerland | 0–8 (0–3) | Italy | Pavelló de Club Patí Vic; Vic |
| 27 July 1992 | | | Francesco Amato (3); Enrico Mariotti (2); Enrico Bernardini; Giuseppe Marzela; Massimo Mariotti | Pavelló de Club Patí Vic; Vic |
| | Umpires: Alfonso Mestres Torrens (ESP) & Joan Serrano Sala (ESP) |

27 July 1992
| 27 July 1992 | Japan | 0–38 (0–16) | Portugal | Pavelló de Club Patí Vic; Vic |
| 27 July 1992 | | | António Neves (16); Luís Ferreira (7); Vitor Hugo Silva (5); Pedro Alves (4); Paulo Alves (2); Rui Lopes (2); Paulo Almeida; Vitor Fortunato | Pavelló de Club Patí Vic; Vic |
| | Umpires: Udo Schaffhoefer (GER) & Carlos Freitas (ANG) |

27 July 1992
| 27 July 1992 | Argentina | 4–4 (3–2) | United States | Pavelló de Club Patí Vic; Vic |
| 27 July 1992 | R. Roldan Gomez (2); A. Rodriguez Crespo; D. Allende Martinez | | Keith Huckaby (2); Dickie Chado; Jeffrey Gibson | Pavelló de Club Patí Vic; Vic |
| | Umpires: Mario del Carlo (ITA) & Luís Alfredo Dias Rei (POR) |

==== Day 3 ====
28 July 1992
| 28 July 1992 | Switzerland | 9–2 (7–1) | Japan | Pavelló de Club Patí Vic; Vic |
| 28 July 1992 | Allain Richard (3); Patrik Roduit (2); Stephane Cotting (2); Gilles Brentini; Jean-Luc Christen | | Hitoshi Fukuda; Nobuyuki Kijima | Pavelló de Club Patí Vic; Vic |
| | Umpires: Ian Leslie Roach (AUS) & Horacio Ricardo Bernardez (ARG) |

28 July 1992
| 28 July 1992 | Portugal | 1–0 (0–0) | Argentina | Pavelló de Club Patí Vic; Vic |
| 28 July 1992 | Paulo Almeida | | | Pavelló de Club Patí Vic; Vic |
| | Umpires: Mario del Carlo (ITA) & Joan Serrano Sala (ESP) |

28 July 1992
| 28 July 1992 | United States | 2–13 (0–4) | Italy | Pavelló de Club Patí Vic; Vic |
| 28 July 1992 | Mike Stevenson (2) | | Francesco Amato (7); Enrico Bernardini (3); Giuseppe Marzella (3) | Pavelló de Club Patí Vic; Vic |
| | Umpires: Alfonso Mestres Torrens (ESP) & Udo Schaffhoefer (GER) |

==== Day 4 ====
29 July 1992
| 29 July 1992 | United States | 5–2 (2–0) | Switzerland | Pavelló de Club Patí Vic; Vic |
| 29 July 1992 | Karl Huckaby (2); Keith Huckaby; Jeffrey Gibson; Mike Stevenson | | Allain Richard; Gilles Brentini | Pavelló de Club Patí Vic; Vic |
| | Umpires: Luís Alfredo Dias Rei (POR) & Carlos Freitas (ANG) |

29 July 1992
| 29 July 1992 | Italy | 5–2 (0–0) | Portugal | Pavelló de Club Patí Vic; Vic |
| 29 July 1992 | Enrico Mariotti (2); Enrico Bernardini; Francesco Amato; Massimo Mariotti | | António Neves; Paulo Almeida | Pavelló de Club Patí Vic; Vic |
| | Umpires: Alfonso Mestres Torrens (ESP) & Joan Serrano Sala (ESP) |

29 July 1992
| 29 July 1992 | Argentina | 13–0 (11–0) | Japan | Pavelló de Club Patí Vic; Vic |
| 29 July 1992 | R. Roldan Gomez (5); G. Cairo Valdivia (2); J. Paez Picon (2); P. Cairo Valdivia (2); A. Cairo Valdivia; R. Monserrat Barragan | | | Pavelló de Club Patí Vic; Vic |
| | Umpires: Udo Schaffhoefer (GER) & Ian Leslie Roach (AUS) |

==== Day 5 ====
30 July 1992
| 30 July 1992 | Japan | 1–25 (0–10) | Italy | Pavelló de Club Patí Vic; Vic |
| 30 July 1992 | Noburu Kawaji | | Francesco Amato (11); Massimo Mariotti (5); Dario Rigo (2); Enrico Bernardini (2); Roberto Crudeli (2); Enrico Mariotti; Giuseppe Marzella; Tommaso Colamaria | Pavelló de Club Patí Vic; Vic |
| | Umpires: Luís Alfredo Dias Rei (POR) & Carlos Freitas (ANG) |

30 July 1992
| 30 July 1992 | Switzerland | 1–2 (1–1) | Argentina | Pavelló de Club Patí Vic; Vic |
| 30 July 1992 | Gilles Brentini | | J. Paez Picon; R. Roldan Gomez | Pavelló de Club Patí Vic; Vic |
| | Umpires: Ian Leslie Roach (AUS) & Alfonso Mestres Torrens (ESP) |

30 July 1992
| 30 July 1992 | Portugal | 7–3 (4–1) | United States | Pavelló de Club Patí Vic; Vic |
| 30 July 1992 | Paulo Almeida (2); Paulo Alves (2); António Neves; Pedro Alves; Vitor Hugo Silva | | Brady Donoghue; Jim Trussell; Mike Stevenson | Pavelló de Club Patí Vic; Vic |
| | Umpires: Mario del Carlo (ITA) & Horacio Ricardo Bernardez (ARG) |

== Group B ==
This group included teams from Angola, Australia, Brazil, Germany, Netherlands and Spain. The matches were played at the Pavelló de l'Ateneu de Sant Sadurní, in Sant Sadurní d'Anoia. The three qualified teams were Spain, Brazil and The Netherlands.

| Team | Pts | Pld | W | D | L | GF | GA |
|---|---|---|---|---|---|---|---|
| 1. Spain | 10 | 5 | 5 | 0 | 0 | 45 | 4 |
| 2. Brazil | 8 | 5 | 4 | 0 | 1 | 27 | 12 |
| 3. Netherlands | 5 | 5 | 2 | 1 | 2 | 22 | 24 |
| 4. Germany | 4 | 5 | 2 | 0 | 3 | 13 | 17 |
| 5. Angola | 3 | 5 | 1 | 1 | 3 | 7 | 23 |
| 6. Australia | 0 | 5 | 0 | 0 | 5 | 7 | 42 |

=== Matches ===
==== Day 1 ====
26 July 1992
| 26 July 1992 | Brazil | 5–3 (3–0) | Germany | Pavelló de l'Ateneu de Sant Sadurní; Sant Sadurní d'Anoia |
| 26 July 1992 | Jurandir Silva (2); Alan Feres Karam; F. Louzada de Jesus; V. Nogueira Santos | | Andreas Thiel; Markus Franken; Ralf Giesen | Pavelló de l'Ateneu de Sant Sadurní; Sant Sadurní d'Anoia |
| | Umpires: Werner Brunner (ITA) & Peter van Lieshout (NED) |

26 July 1992
| 26 July 1992 | Netherlands | 3–3 (2–2) | Angola | Pavelló de l'Ateneu de Sant Sadurní; Sant Sadurní d'Anoia |
| 26 July 1992 | J. van Diejen; R. Lugtenburg; Ronald Grijseels | | Tota Monteiro (2); Né Santos | Pavelló de l'Ateneu de Sant Sadurní; Sant Sadurní d'Anoia |
| | Umpires: José Emygdio Costa (BRA) & Eric Girard (SUI) |

26 July 1992
| 26 July 1992 | Australia | 1–17 (1–9) | Spain | Pavelló de l'Ateneu de Sant Sadurní; Sant Sadurní d'Anoia |
| 26 July 1992 | Nicholas J. Galtos | | A. Avecilla Porto (5); A. Rovira Lecha (4); F. Pujalte Camarasa (3); S. Carda Torner (2); Joan Ayats Presas; Joan Carles Colas; J. Benito Martinez | Pavelló de l'Ateneu de Sant Sadurní; Sant Sadurní d'Anoia |
| | Umpires: Robert Glenn Gara (USA) & João António Pereira Faria (POR) |

==== Day 2 ====
27 July 1992
| 27 July 1992 | Angola | 1–8 (1–2) | Brazil | Pavelló de l'Ateneu de Sant Sadurní; Sant Sadurní d'Anoia |
| 27 July 1992 | Sony Amado | | Jurandir Silva (3); Alan Feres Karam (2); M. Cavallaro (2); F. Louzada de Jesus | Pavelló de l'Ateneu de Sant Sadurní; Sant Sadurní d'Anoia |
| | Umpires: Miguel Angel Marti Corcuera (ESP) & João António Pereira Faria (POR) |

27 July 1992
| 27 July 1992 | Germany | 4–1 (2–1) | Australia | Pavelló de l'Ateneu de Sant Sadurní; Sant Sadurní d'Anoia |
| 27 July 1992 | Andreas Thiel; Markus Franken; Michael Neubauer; Ulrich Pfeifer | | Keith John Reinke | Pavelló de l'Ateneu de Sant Sadurní; Sant Sadurní d'Anoia |
| | Umpires: Eric Girard (SUI) & Werner Brunner (ITA) |

27 July 1992
| 27 July 1992 | Spain | 11–1 (3–1) | Netherlands | Pavelló de l'Ateneu de Sant Sadurní; Sant Sadurní d'Anoia |
| 27 July 1992 | A. Avecilla Porto (3); Joana Carles Colas (3); A. Rovira Lecha (2); S. Carda Torner (2); J. Benito Martinez | | T. van den Dungen | Pavelló de l'Ateneu de Sant Sadurní; Sant Sadurní d'Anoia |
| | Umpires: José Emygdio Costa (BRA) & Neville Edwin Black (GBR) |

==== Day 3 ====
28 July 1992
| 28 July 1992 | Australia | 0–2 (0–0) | Angola | Pavelló de l'Ateneu de Sant Sadurní; Sant Sadurní d'Anoia |
| 28 July 1992 | | | Sony Amado; Orlando Graça | Pavelló de l'Ateneu de Sant Sadurní; Sant Sadurní d'Anoia |
| | Umpires: José Emygdio Costa (BRA) & Neville Edwin Black (GBR) |

28 July 1992
| 28 July 1992 | Brazil | 6–2 (4–1) | Netherlands | Pavelló de l'Ateneu de Sant Sadurní; Sant Sadurní d'Anoia |
| 28 July 1992 | Alan Feres Karam (3); Jurandir Silva (2); V. Nogueira Santos | | Arjan Vangerven; T. van den Dungen | Pavelló de l'Ateneu de Sant Sadurní; Sant Sadurní d'Anoia |
| | Umpires: Werner Brunner (ITA) & Miguel Angel Marti Corcuera (ESP) |

28 July 1992
| 28 July 1992 | Spain | 5–1 (3–1) | Germany | Pavelló de l'Ateneu de Sant Sadurní; Sant Sadurní d'Anoia |
| 28 July 1992 | Joan Carles Colas (2); A. Avecilla Porto; A. Rovira Lecha; Joan Ayats Presas | | Markus Franken | Pavelló de l'Ateneu de Sant Sadurní; Sant Sadurní d'Anoia |
| | Umpires: João António Pereira Faria (POR) & Peter van Lieshout (NED) |

==== Day 4 ====
29 July 1992
| 29 July 1992 | Netherlands | 12–1 (5–1) | Australia | Pavelló de l'Ateneu de Sant Sadurní; Sant Sadurní d'Anoia |
| 29 July 1992 | Arjan Vangerven (4); Hans Maranus (2); Patrick Zwaanswijk (2); Remon Lugtenburg (2); J. van Diejen; T. van den Dungen | | Markus Franken | Pavelló de l'Ateneu de Sant Sadurní; Sant Sadurní d'Anoia |
| | Umpires: José Emygdio Costa (BRA) & Neville Edwin Black (GBR) |

29 July 1992
| 29 July 1992 | Angola | 1–2 (0–1) | Germany | Pavelló de l'Ateneu de Sant Sadurní; Sant Sadurní d'Anoia |
| 29 July 1992 | Vado de Carvalho | | Michael Neubauer; Ralf Giesen | Pavelló de l'Ateneu de Sant Sadurní; Sant Sadurní d'Anoia |
| | Umpires: Miguel Angel Marti Corcuera (ESP) & Peter van Lieshout (NED) |

29 July 1992
| 29 July 1992 | Brazil | 1–2 (0–1) | Spain | Pavelló de l'Ateneu de Sant Sadurní; Sant Sadurní d'Anoia |
| 29 July 1992 | Jurandir Silva | | F. Pujalte Camarasa; Joan Ayats Presas | Pavelló de l'Ateneu de Sant Sadurní; Sant Sadurní d'Anoia |
| | Umpires: João António Pereira Faria (POR) & Robert Glenn Gara (USA) |

==== Day 5 ====
30 July 1992
| 30 July 1992 | Australia | 4–7 (3–3) | Brazil | Pavelló de l'Ateneu de Sant Sadurní; Sant Sadurní d'Anoia |
| 30 July 1992 | Keith John Reinke (2); Nicholas J. Galtos (2) | | Jurandir Silva (3); V. Nogueira Santos (2); Alan Feres Karam; M. Cavallaro | Pavelló de l'Ateneu de Sant Sadurní; Sant Sadurní d'Anoia |
| | Umpires: Robert Glenn Gara (USA) & Peter van Lieshout (NED) |

30 July 1992
| 30 July 1992 | Germany | 3–5 (2–2) | Netherlands | Pavelló de l'Ateneu de Sant Sadurní; Sant Sadurní d'Anoia |
| 30 July 1992 | Andreas Thiel; Markus Franken; Michael Neubauer | | Arjan Vangerven (2); Ronald Grijseels (2); Patrick Zwaanswijk | Pavelló de l'Ateneu de Sant Sadurní; Sant Sadurní d'Anoia |
| | Umpires: Miguel Angel Marti Corcuera (ESP) & Werner Brunner (ITA) |

30 July 1992
| 30 July 1992 | Spain | 10–0 (4–0) | Angola | Pavelló de l'Ateneu de Sant Sadurní; Sant Sadurní d'Anoia |
| 30 July 1992 | J. Benito Martinez (3); Joan Carles Colas (3); A. Avecilla Porto; A. Rovila Lecha; Joan Ayats Presas; S. Carda Torner | | | Pavelló de l'Ateneu de Sant Sadurní; Sant Sadurní d'Anoia |
| | Umpires: Neville Edwin Black (GBR) & Eric Girard (SUI) |

== See also ==
- Roller hockey at the 1992 Summer Olympics - Semi-finals
