= List of Olympic venues in handball =

For the Summer Olympics, there are 27 venues that have been or will be used for handball.

Games	Venue	Other sports hosted at venue for those games	Capacity	Ref.
1936 Berlin	BSV 92 Field & Stadium	Cycling (track)	1,000	
1936 Berlin	Olympic Stadium (final)	Athletics, equestrian (jumping), football (final)	100,000	
1936 Berlin	Police Stadium	None	Not listed	
1972 Munich	Böblingen Sportshalle	None	Not listed	
1972 Munich	Donauhalle Ulm	None	2,300	
1972 Munich	Hohenstaufenhalle Göppingen	None	5,599	
1972 Munich	Olympiahalle (final)	Gymnastics	10,563	
1972 Munich	Sporthalle Augsburg	None	3,093	
1976 Montreal	Complexe sportif Claude-Robillard	Handball	4,721 (Handball); 2,755 (Water polo)	
1976 Montreal	Montreal Forum (men's medal matches)	Basketball (final), boxing (final), gymnastics, volleyball (final)	18,000	
1976 Montreal	Pavilion de l'éducation physique et des sports de l'Université Laval	None	3,732	
1980 Moscow	Dynamo Palace of Sports	None	5,000	
1980 Moscow	Sokolniki Sports Palace (final)	None	6,800	
1984 Los Angeles	Titan Gymnasium	None	3,300	
1988 Seoul	Suwon Gymnasium	None	6,000	
1992 Barcelona	Palau D'Esports de Granollers	None	5,500	
1992 Barcelona	Palau Sant Jordi (final)	Gymnastics (artistic), volleyball (final)	15,000	
1996 Atlanta	Georgia Dome (men's final)	Basketball (final), gymnastics (artistic)	35,000	
1996 Atlanta	Georgia World Congress Center	Fencing, judo, modern pentathlon (fencing, shooting), table tennis, weightlifting, wrestling	7,300 (handball); 3,900 (fencing); 7,300 (judo); 4,700 (table tennis); 5,000 (weightlifting); 7,300 (wrestling)	
2000 Sydney	The Dome and Exhibition Complex	Badminton, basketball, gymnastics (rhythmic), modern pentathlon (fencing, shooting), volleyball (indoor)	10,000	
2004 Athens	Faliro Sports Pavilion Arena	Taekwondo	10,000	
2004 Athens	Helliniko Indoor Arena (final)	Basketball	15,000	
2008 Beijing	Beijing National Indoor Stadium (final)	Gymnastics (artistic, trampoline)	19,000	
2008 Beijing	Olympic Sports Center Gymnasium	None	7,000	
2012 London	Basketball Arena (medal round)	Basketball	12,000	
2012 London	Copper Box	Fencing, modern pentathlon (fencing)	7,000	
2016 Rio de Janeiro	Future Arena	None	12,000	
2020 Tokyo	Yoyogi National Gymnasium	None	10,200	
2024 Paris	Stade Pierre-Mauroy (finals)	Basketball (preliminaries)	26,000	
2024 Paris	Paris Expo Porte de Versailles	Table tennis, volleyball, weightlifting	6,000	
2028 Los Angeles	Long Beach Arena	None	12,000	
2032 Brisbane	Brisbane Entertainment Centre	None	11,000	

== Gallery of venues ==
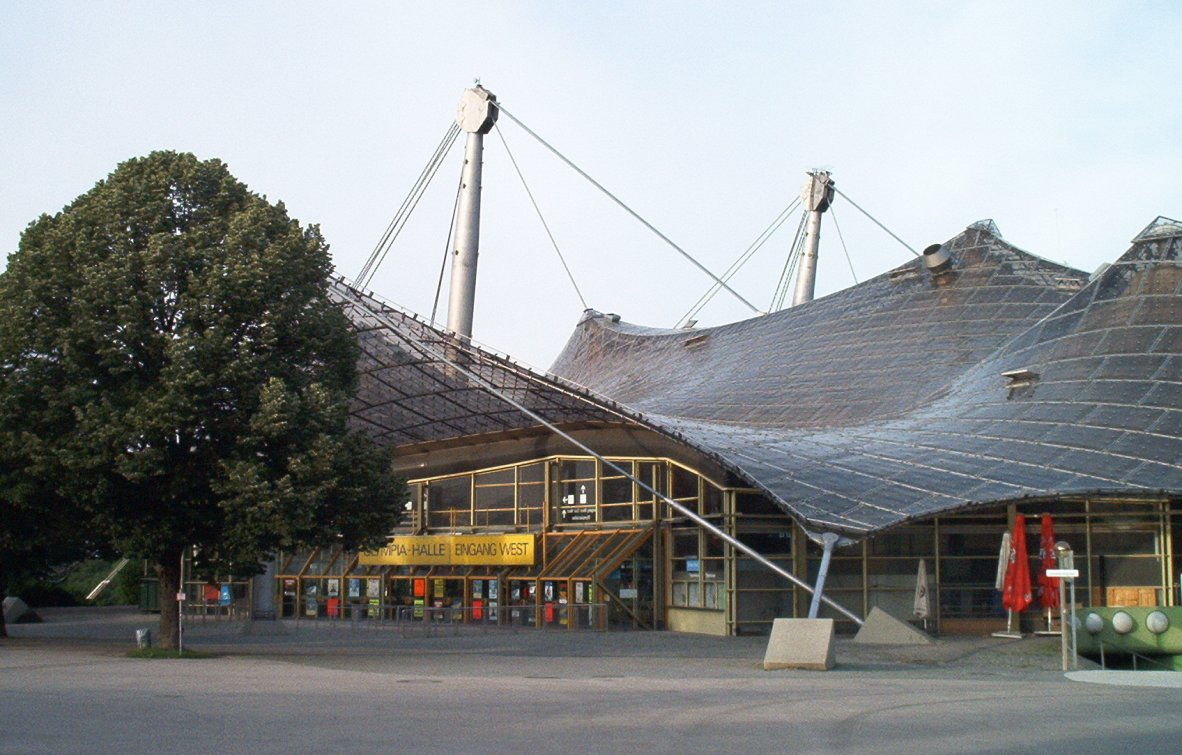
Olympiahalle hosted the handball final at the 1972 Summer Olympics in Munich.

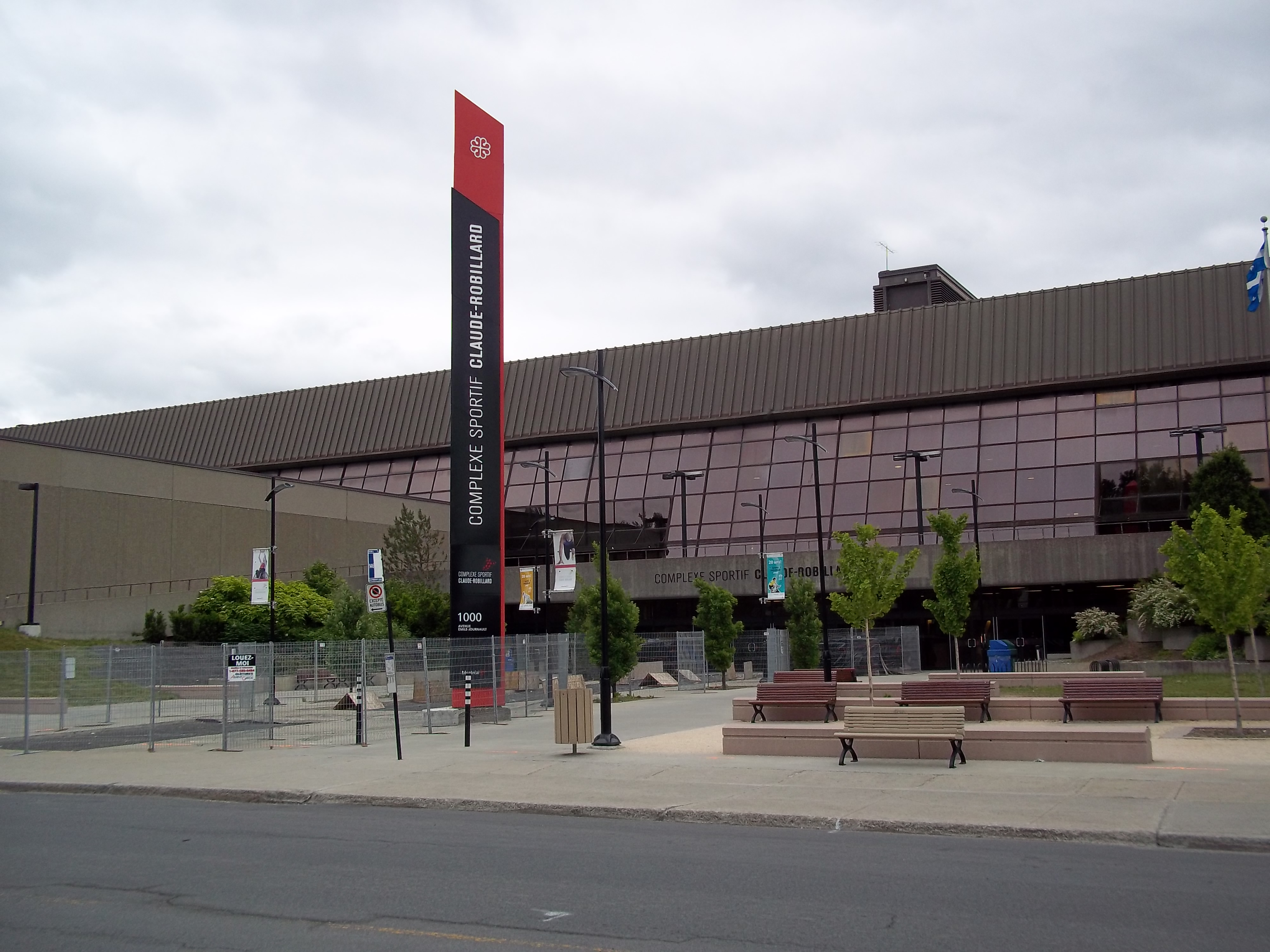
Complexe sportif Claude-Robillard hosted handball at the 1976 Summer Olympics in Montreal.

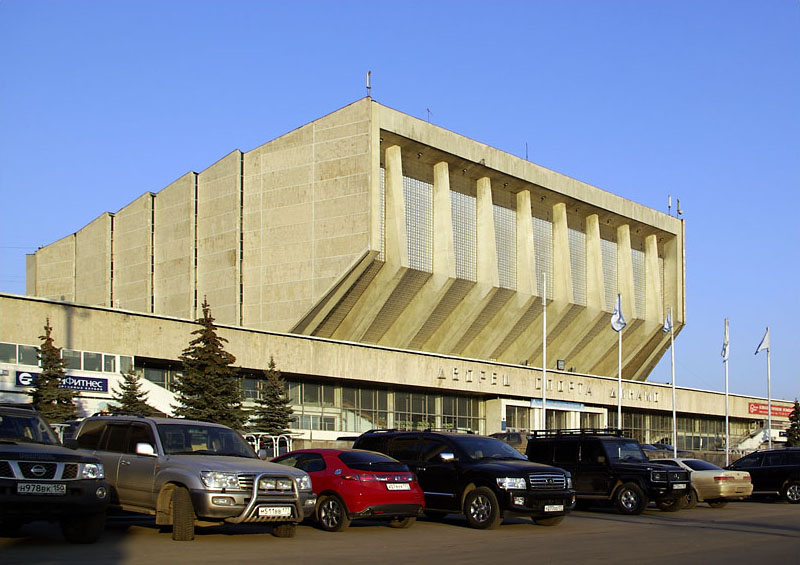
Dynamo Palace of Sports hosted several handball matches at the 1980 Summer Olympics in Moscow.

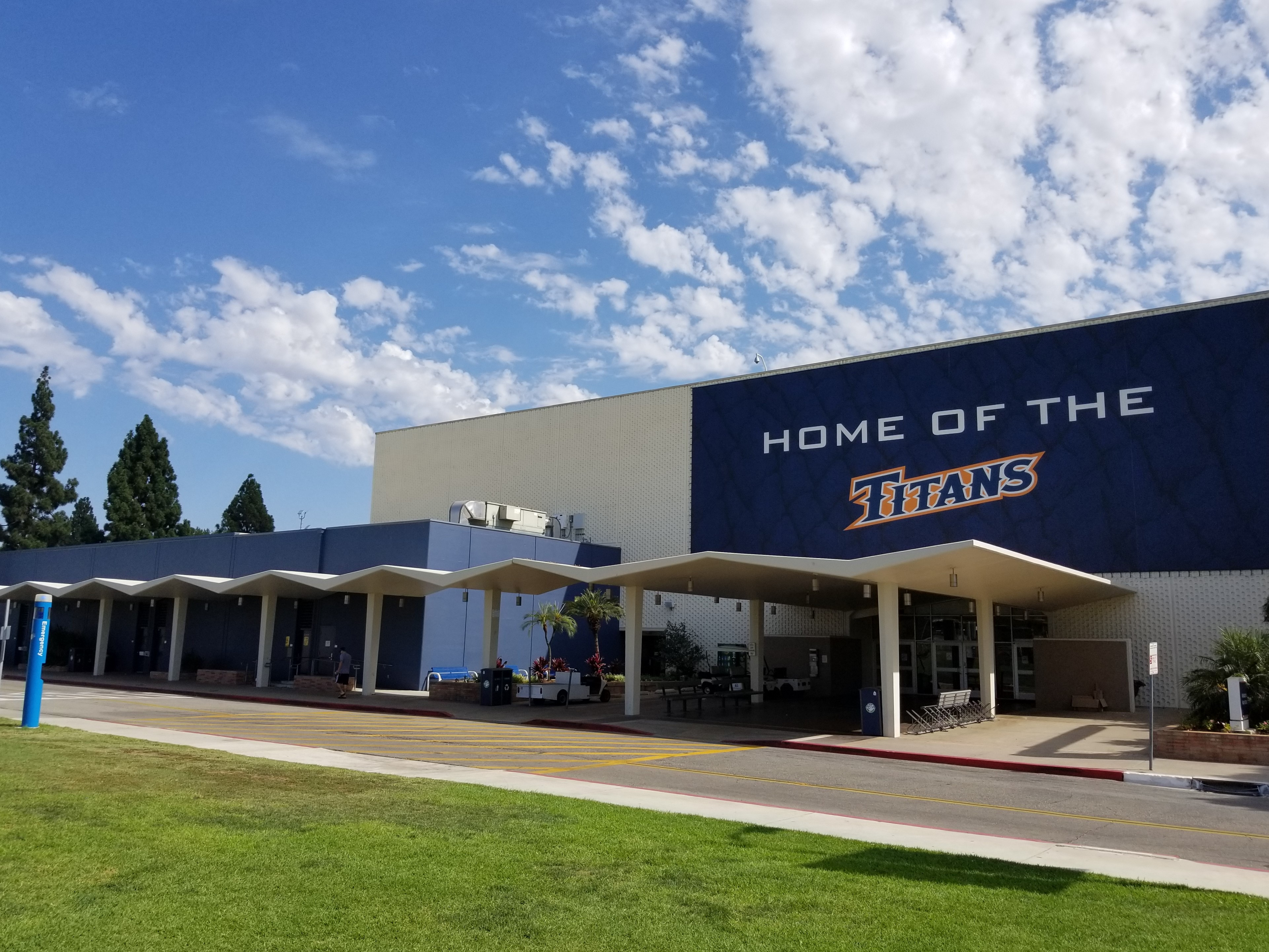
Titan Gym hosted handball at the 1984 Summer Olympics in Los Angeles.

Suwon Gymnasium hosted handball at the 1988 Summer Olympics in Seoul.

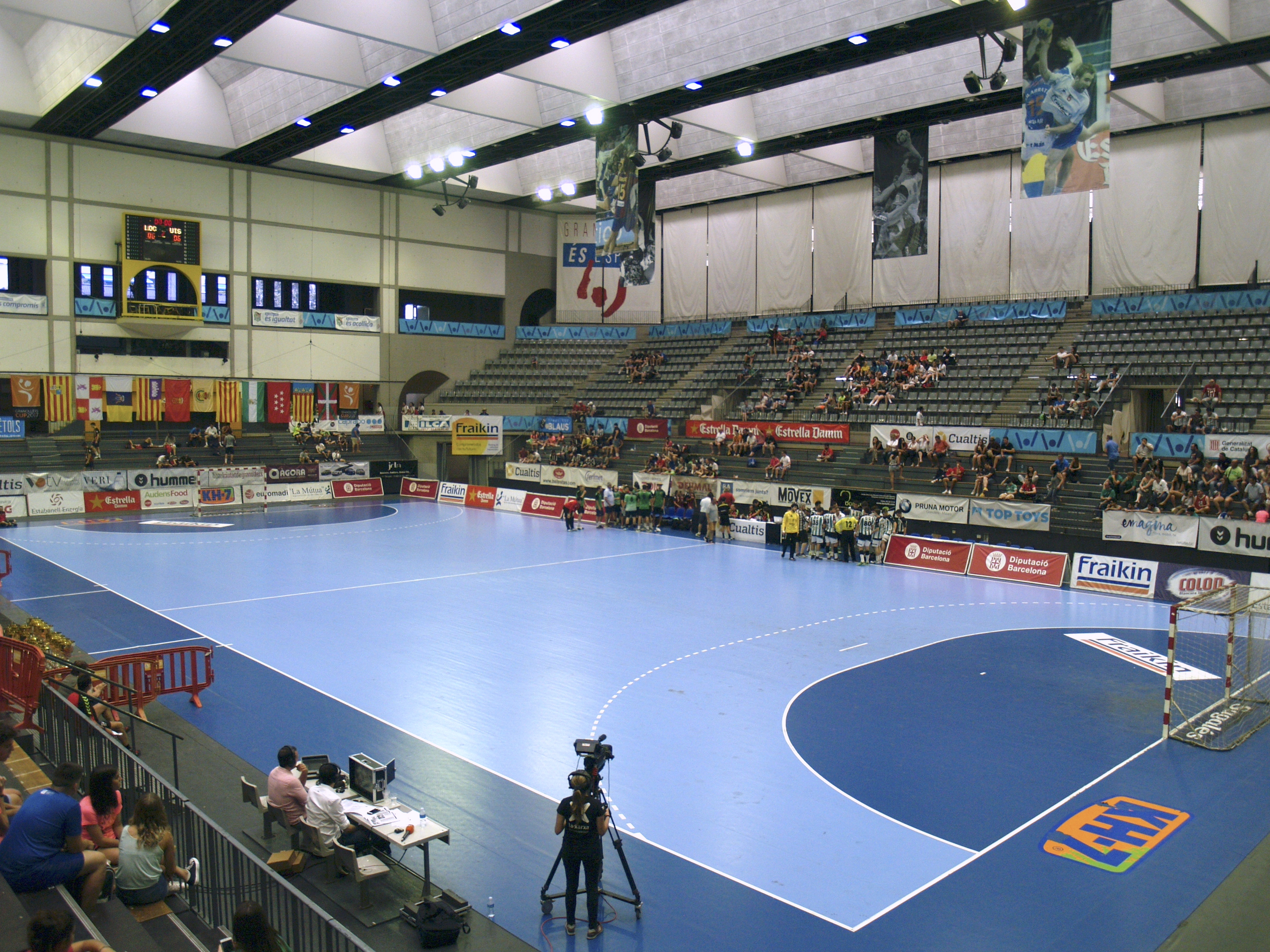
Palau d'Esports de Granollers hosted handball at the 1992 Summer Olympics in Barcelona.

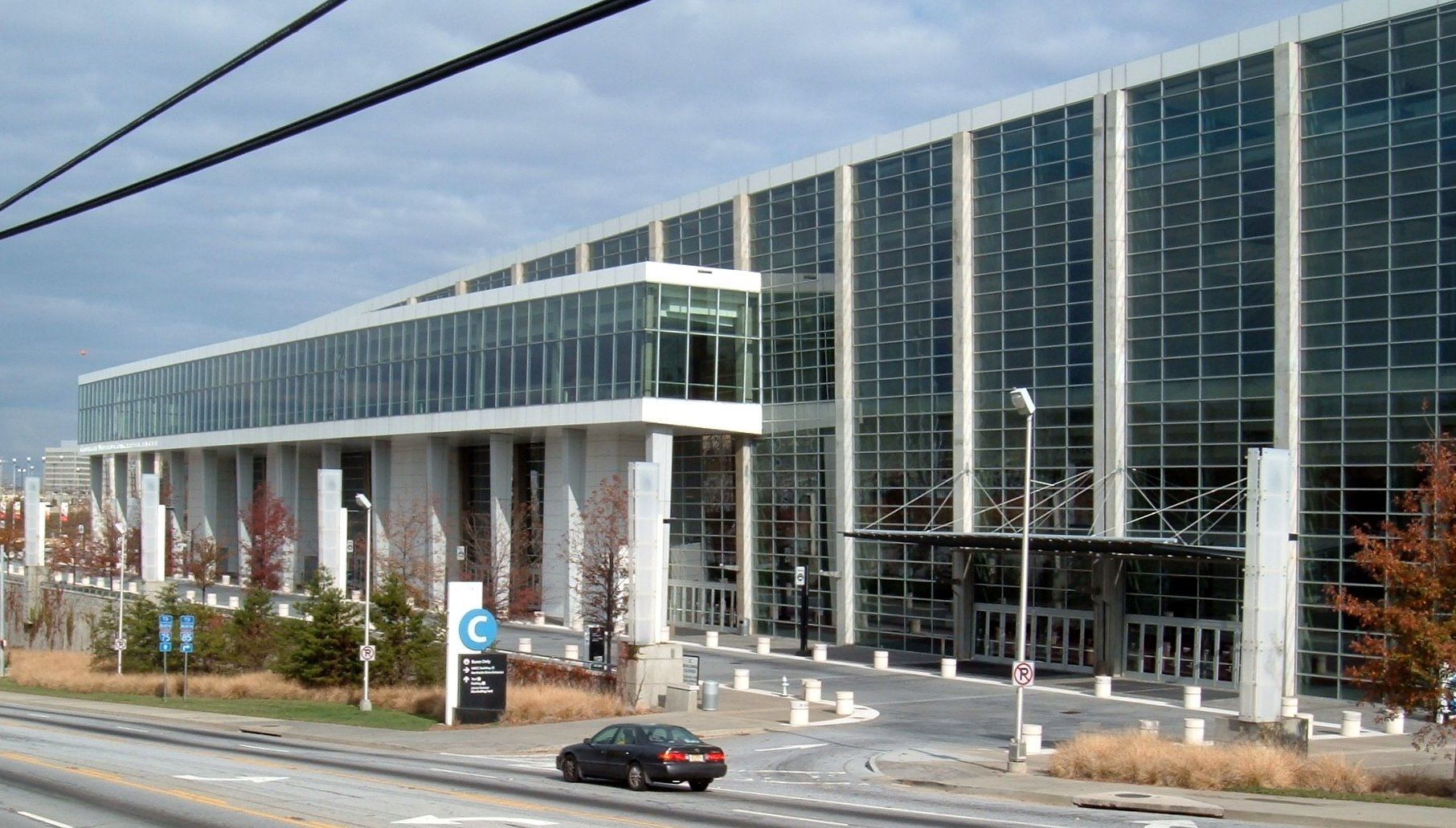
Georgia World Congress Center hosted handball at the 1996 Summer Olympics in Atlanta.

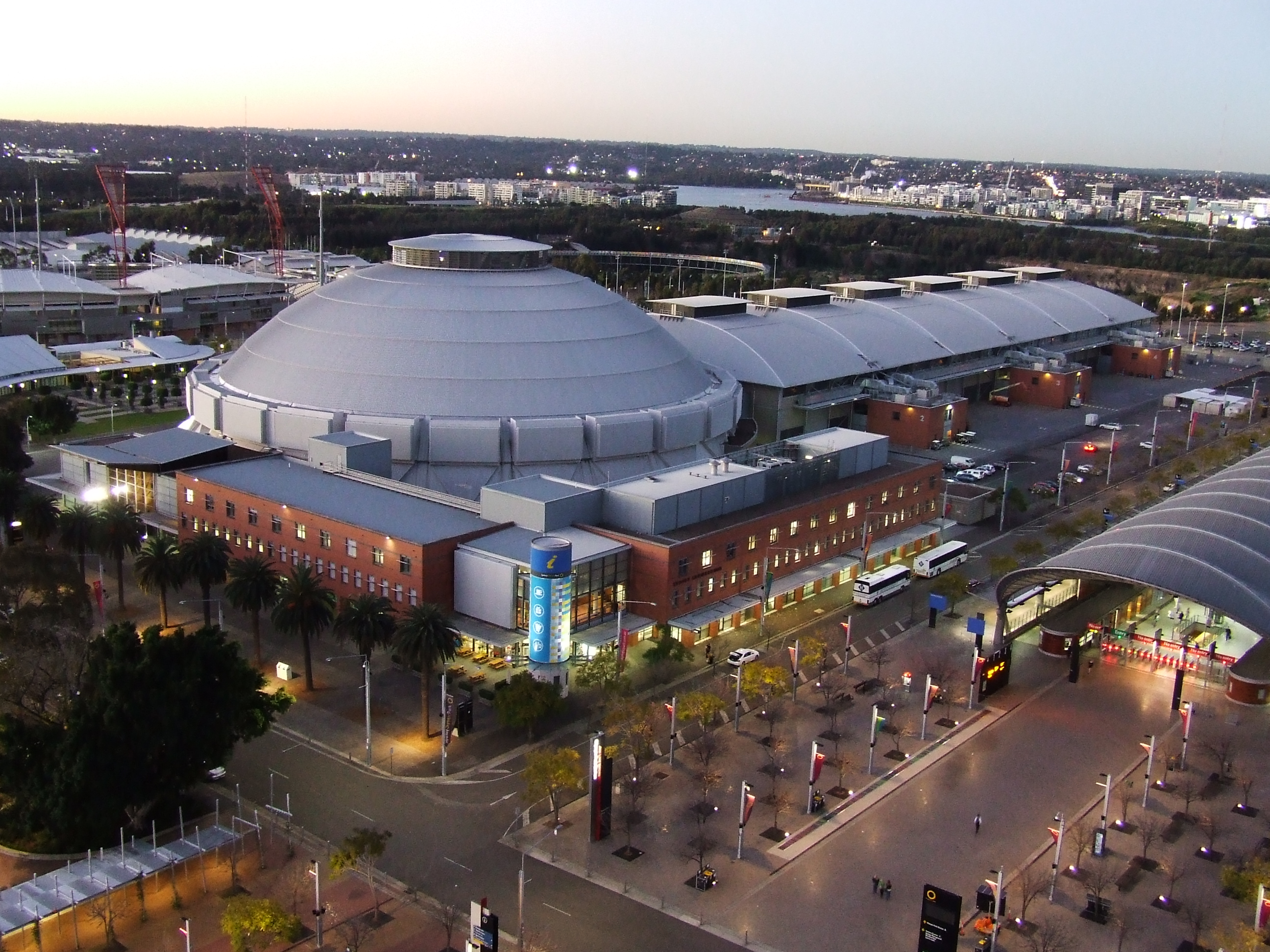
The Dome hosted handball at the 2000 Summer Olympics in Sydney.

Faliro Sports Pavilion Arena hosted handball at the 2004 Summer Olympics in Athens.

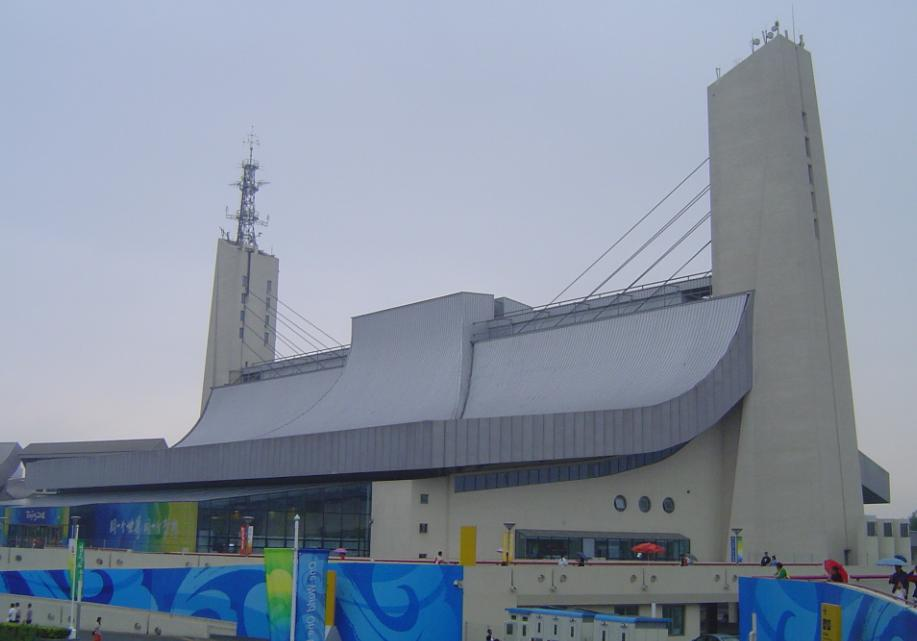
Olympic Sports Center Gymnasium hosted handball at the 2008 Summer Olympics in Beijing.

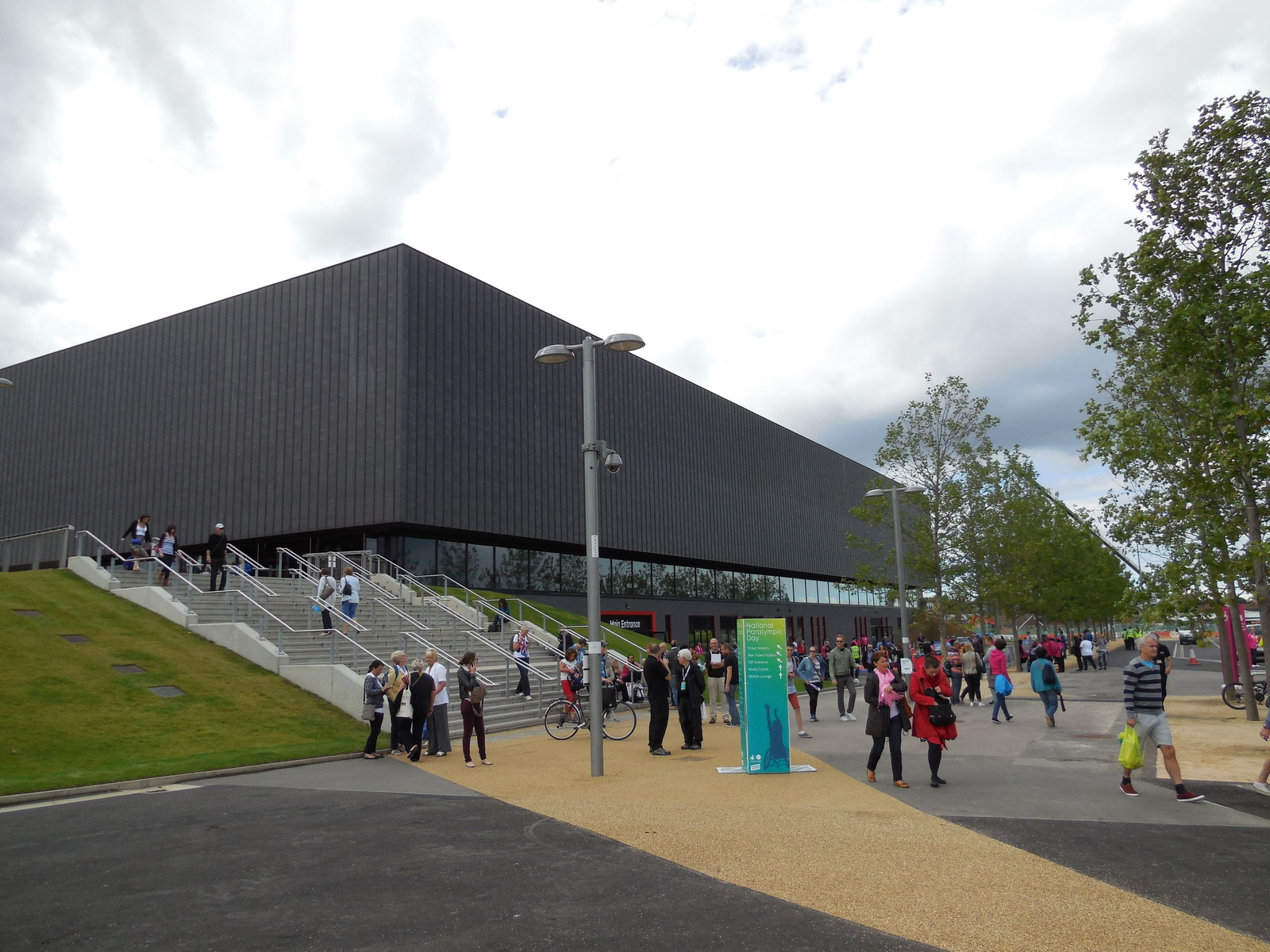
Copper Box Arena hosted handball at the 2012 Summer Olympics in London.

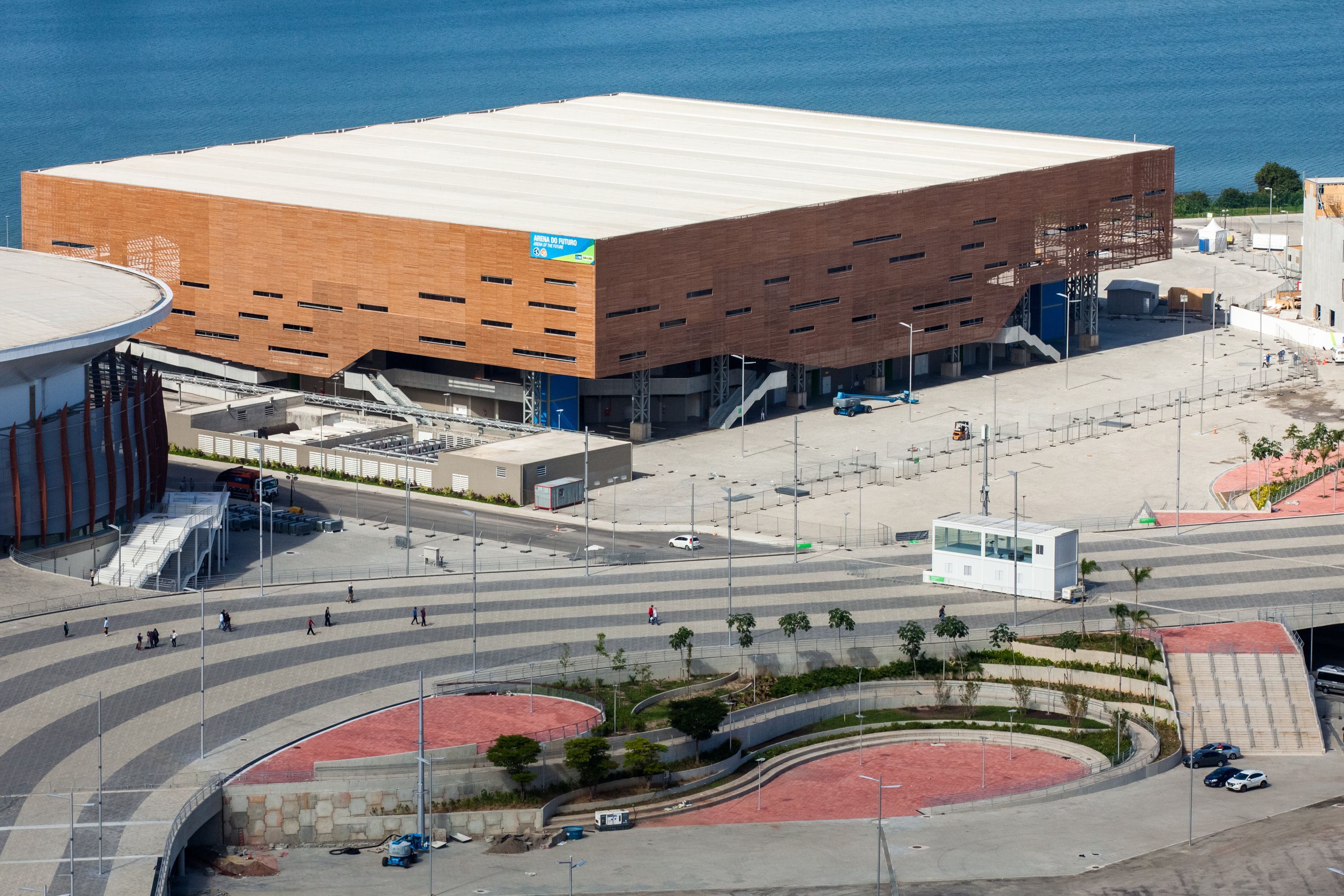
Future Arena hosted handball at the 2016 Summer Olympics in Rio de Janeiro.

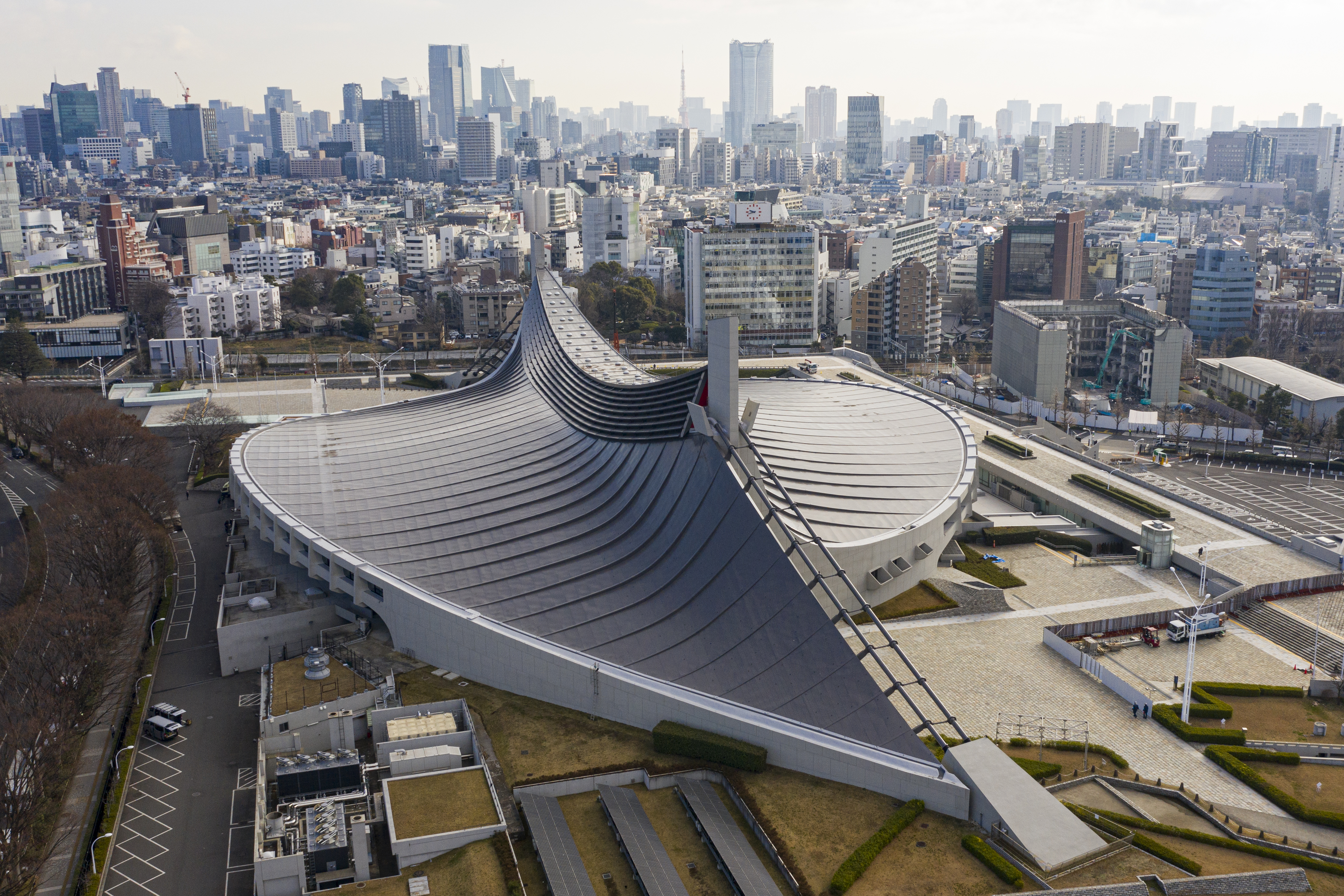
Yoyogi National Stadium hosted handball at the 2020 Summer Olympics in Tokyo.

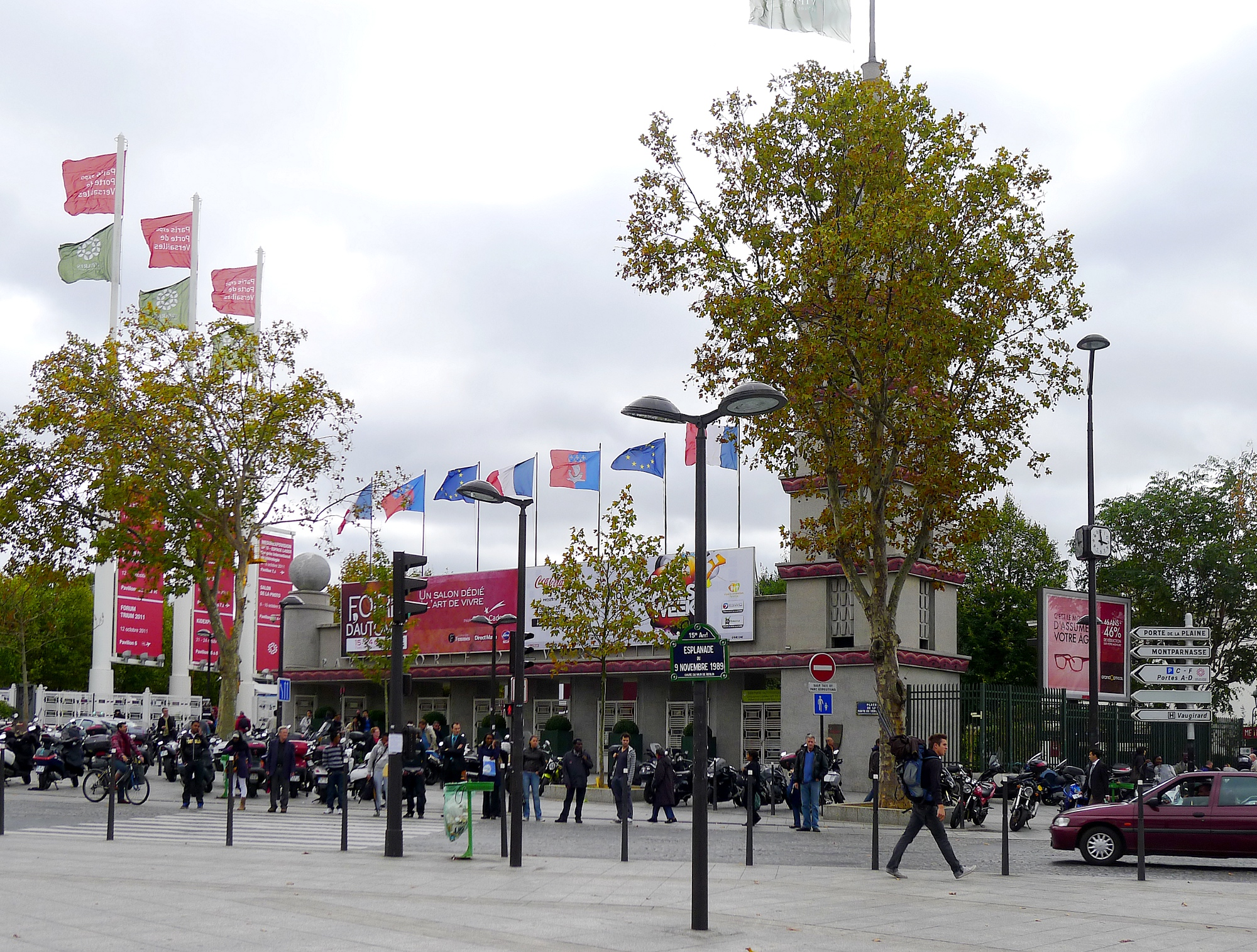
Paris Expo Porte de Versailles hosted handball at the 2024 Summer Olympics.

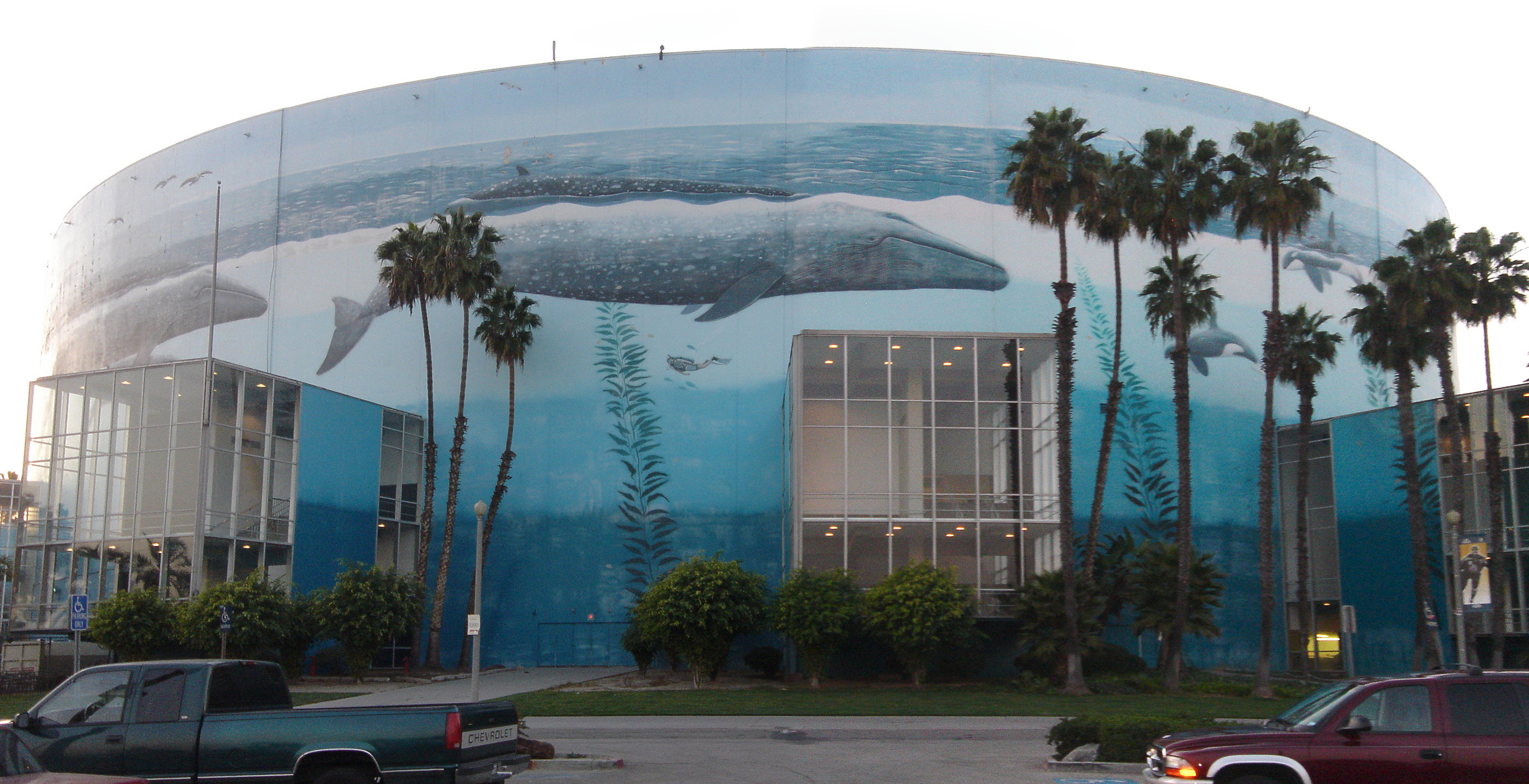
The Long Beach Arena will host handball at the 2028 Summer Olympics in Los Angeles.
