= Hockey at the 1992 Olympics =

Hockey at the 1992 Olympics may refer to:

- Ice hockey at the 1992 Winter Olympics
- Field hockey at the 1992 Summer Olympics
- Roller hockey at the 1992 Summer Olympics
