= Roller hockey at the 1992 Summer Olympics – Semi-finals =

The semi-finals of the 1992 Summer Olympics roller hockey competition were staged between 1 and 5 August at the Pavelló d'Esports de Reus, in Reus. At this phase, a new group included the six teams which advanced from the preliminary round groups – Argentina, Brazil, Italy, Netherlands, Portugal and Spain. Every team played against each other one time, for a total of 5 matches, one match per day. In the end, the best two teams qualified for the final match to award the gold medal and the third and fourth teams competed for the bronze medal.

Team	Pts	Pld	W	D	L	GF	GA
1. Spain	9	5	4	1	0	19	8
2. Argentina	8	5	4	0	1	18	9
3. Portugal	6	5	3	0	2	22	12
4. Italy	4	5	2	0	3	21	19
5. Brazil	3	5	1	1	3	12	20
6. Netherlands	0	5	0	0	5	5	29

== Matches ==
=== Day 1 ===
1 August 1992
1 August 1992	Netherlands	0–5 (0–2)	Brazil	Pavelló d'Esports de Reus; Reus
1 August 1992			Alan Feres Karam (2); F. Louzada de Jesus; Jurandir Silva; M. Cavallaro	Pavelló d'Esports de Reus; Reus
	Umpires: Miguel Angel Marti Corcuera (ESP) & Mario del Carlo (ITA)

1 August 1992
1 August 1992	Portugal	5–3 (3–2)	Italy	Pavelló d'Esports de Reus; Reus
1 August 1992	Luís Ferreira (3); Paulo Almeida; Paulo Alves		Massimo Mariotti (2); Enrico Mariotti	Pavelló d'Esports de Reus; Reus
	Umpires: Alfonso Mestres Torrens (ESP) & Horacio Ricardo Bernardez (ARG)

1 August 1992
1 August 1992	Argentina	2–3 (1–2)	Spain	Pavelló d'Esports de Reus; Reus
1 August 1992	A. Rodriguez Crespo; R. Roldan Gomez		A. Avecilla Porto; Joan Ayats Presas; S. Carda Torner	Pavelló d'Esports de Reus; Reus
	Umpires: Luis Alfredo Dias Rei (POR) & José Emygdio Costa (BRA)

=== Day 2 ===
2 August 1992
2 August 1992	Brazil	1–6 (0–3)	Italy	Pavelló d'Esports de Reus; Reus
2 August 1992	M. Cavallaro		Francesco Amato (3); Massimo Mariotti (2); Enrico Bernardini	Pavelló d'Esports de Reus; Reus
	Umpires: Luis Alfredo Dias Rei (POR) & Alfonso Mestres Torrens (ESP)

2 August 1992
2 August 1992	Argentina	2–1 (1–0)	Portugal	Pavelló d'Esports de Reus; Reus
2 August 1992	D. Allende Martinez; P. Cairo Valdivia		Paulo Alves	Pavelló d'Esports de Reus; Reus
	Umpires: Miguel Angel Marti Corcuera (ESP) & Mario del Carlo (ITA)

2 August 1992
2 August 1992	Netherlands	1–5 (1–1)	Spain	Pavelló d'Esports de Reus; Reus
2 August 1992	Remon Lugtenburg; P. Cairo Valdivia		J. Benito Martinez (2); A. Avecilla Porto; Joan Carles Colas; S. Carda Torner	Pavelló d'Esports de Reus; Reus
	Umpires: Carlos Freitas (ANG) & José Emygdio Costa (BRA)

=== Day 3 ===
3 August 1992
3 August 1992	Brazil	1–3 (0–2)	Argentina	Pavelló d'Esports de Reus; Reus
3 August 1992	V. Nogueira Santos		R. Roldan Gomez (2); J. Paez Picon	Pavelló d'Esports de Reus; Reus
	Umpires: Alfonso Mestres Torrens (ESP) & Robert Glenn Gara (USA)

3 August 1992
3 August 1992	Netherlands	1–8 (0–6)	Italy	Pavelló d'Esports de Reus; Reus
3 August 1992	M. Lugtenburg		Francesco Amato (3); Enrico Mariotti (2); Massimo Mariotti (2); Roberto Crudeli	Pavelló d'Esports de Reus; Reus
	Umpires: José Emygdio Costa (BRA) & Miguel Angel Marti Corcuera (ESP)

3 August 1992
3 August 1992	Spain	3–1 (0–0)	Portugal	Pavelló d'Esports de Reus; Reus
3 August 1992	F. Pujalte Camarasa; Joan Ayats Presas; Joan Carles Colas		Luís Ferreira	Pavelló d'Esports de Reus; Reus
	Umpires: Mario del Carlo (ITA) & Horacio Ricardo Bernardez (ARG)

=== Day 4 ===
4 August 1992
4 August 1992	Portugal	7–2 (1–2)	Netherlands	Pavelló d'Esports de Reus; Reus
4 August 1992	Vitor Hugo Silva (2); Vitor Fortunato (2); António Neves; Luís Ferreira; Paulo Alves		Arjan Vangerven; M. Lugtenburg	Pavelló d'Esports de Reus; Reus
	Umpires: José Emygdio Costa (BRA) & Miguel Angel Marti Corcuera (ESP)

4 August 1992
4 August 1992	Spain	3–3 (1–2)	Brazil	Pavelló d'Esports de Reus; Reus
4 August 1992	Joan Ayats Presas (2); Joan Carles Colas		V. Nogueira Santos; M. Cavallaro	Pavelló d'Esports de Reus; Reus
	Umpires: Mario del Carlo (ITA) & Carlos Freitas (ANG)

4 August 1992
4 August 1992	Italy	3–7 (0–1)	Argentina	Pavelló d'Esports de Reus; Reus
4 August 1992	Francesco Amato (2); Roberto Crudeli		G. Cairo Valdivia (2); J. Paez Picon (2); D. Allende Martinez; P. Cairo Valdivia; R. Roldan Gomez	Pavelló d'Esports de Reus; Reus
	Umpires: Luis Alfredo Dias Rei (POR) & Alfonso Mestres Torrens (ESP)

=== Day 5 ===
5 August 1992
5 August 1992	Argentina	4–1 (2–1)	Netherlands	Pavelló d'Esports de Reus; Reus
5 August 1992	D. Allende Martinez; G. Cairo Valdivia; P. Cairo Valdivia; R. Monserrat Barragan		Remon Lugtenburg	Pavelló d'Esports de Reus; Reus
	Umpires: Miguel Angel Marti Corcuera (ESP) & Alfonso Mestres Torrens (ESP)

5 August 1992
5 August 1992	Portugal	8–2 (1–0)	Brazil	Pavelló d'Esports de Reus; Reus
5 August 1992	António Neves (3); Pedro Alves (2); Rui Lopes (2); Vitor Fortunato		Jurandir Silva	Pavelló d'Esports de Reus; Reus
	Umpires: Carlos Freitas (ANG) & Robert Glenn Gara (USA)

5 August 1992
5 August 1992	Italy	1–5 (0–3)	Spain	Pavelló d'Esports de Reus; Reus
5 August 1992	Dario Rigo		A. Rovira Lecha (2); F. Pujalte Camarasa; Joan Carles Colas; R. Peralta Rabade	Pavelló d'Esports de Reus; Reus
	Umpires: Luis Alfredo Dias Rei (POR) & José Emygdio Costa (BRA)

== See also ==
- Roller hockey at the 1992 Summer Olympics - Preliminary round
