= Pavelló de l'Ateneu de Sant Sadurní =

Arena in Sant Sadurní d'Anoia, Spain

Coordinates: 41°25′23″N 1°47′0″E

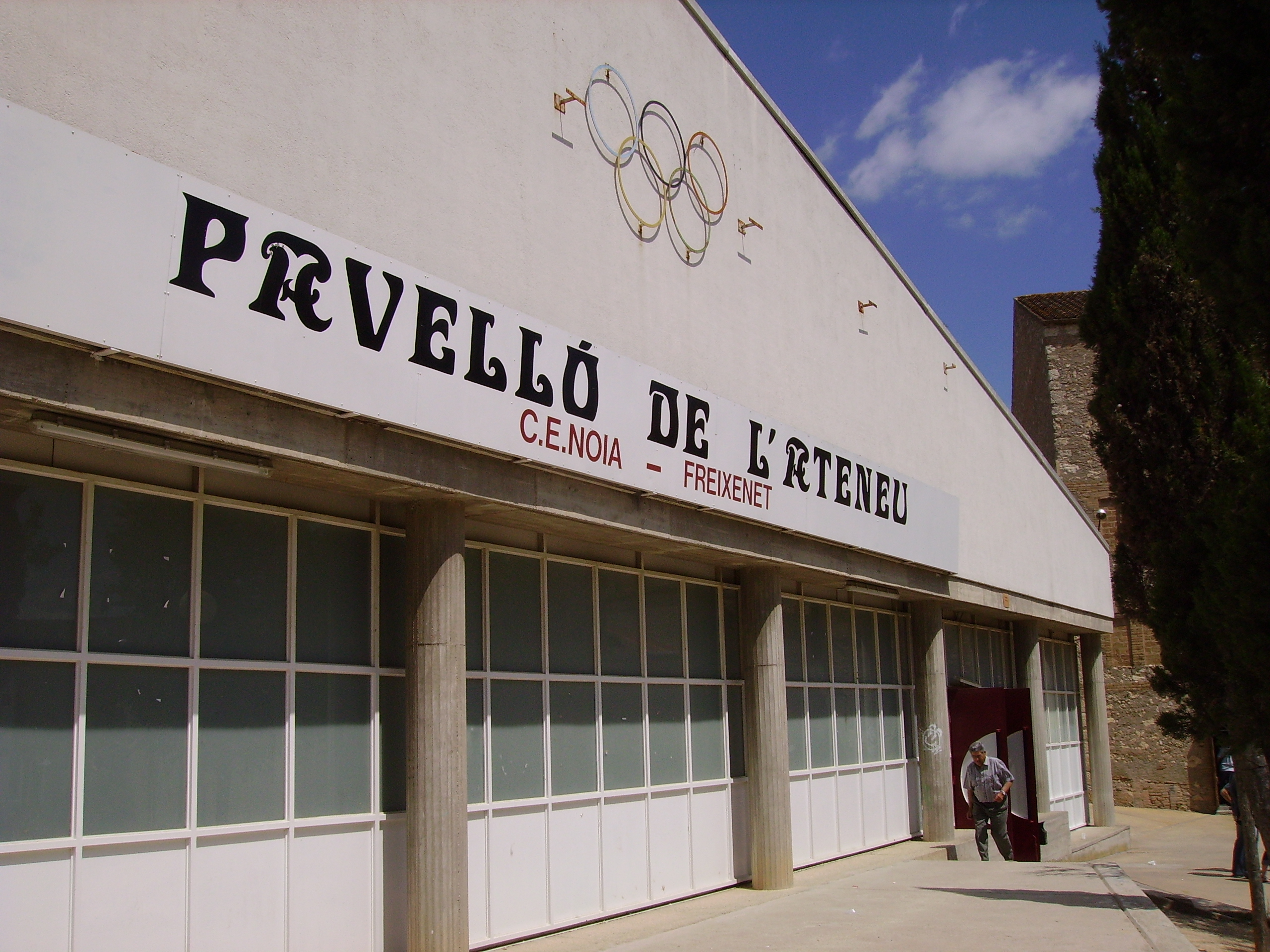
Pavelló de l'Ateneu de Sant Sadurní

The Pavelló de l'Ateneu de Sant Sadurní is an indoor arena located in Sant Sadurní d'Anoia, Catalonia. Opened in 1981, the venue was one of the hosts for the demonstration roller hockey competitions at the 1992 Summer Olympics.
