= Ralf Giesen =

German athlete

Personal information
- Nationality: German
- Born: 3 November 1961 (age 63)

Sport
- Sport: Roller hockey
- Event: Men's roller hockey

Ralf Giesen (born 3 November 1961) is a German athlete. He competed in roller hockey at the 1992 Summer Olympics.
