= Police Stadium (Berlin) =

Sports venue located in Berlin, Germany

The Police Stadium was a sports venue located in Berlin, Germany. It hosted several games of the handball tournament for the 1936 Summer Olympics.
