= Vítor Hugo da Silva =

Portuguese roller hockey player and coach

Vítor Hugo Barbosa Carvalho da Silva (born 4 April 1963, in Espinho), known as Vítor Hugo, is a former Portuguese roller hockey player and a current coach. He played as a forward. An outstanding player and a prolific goalscorer, he is usually considered the best Portuguese roller hockey player in succession to António Livramento. He is professionally a physician dentist.

== Playing career ==
Vítor Hugo was one of the best FC Porto players, appearing in the first team in 1979/80, aged only 16 years old. He would play almost his entire career for FC Porto, winning 8 National Championship titles, in 1982/83, 1983/84, 1984/85, 1985/86, 1986/87, 1988/89, 1989/90 and 1990/91. He played a single season for Hockey Novara, in Italy, in 1987/88, also winning the National Championship. He left competition aged only 29 years old to finish his degree as a physician dentist.

Vítor Hugo was called for the first time for Portugal in 1979, aged 16 years old. He had 122 caps for the National Team, from 1979 to 1992, scoring 195 goals. He won the Rink Hockey European Championship in 1987 and 1992, and the Rink Hockey World Championship in 1991. He was the captain at the disappointing performance of Portugal at the 1992 Summer Olympic Games, where roller hockey was demonstration sport, finishing only in 4th place. He announced he was leaving competition after the tournament.

== Coaching career ==
He later would be a coach, helping Académica to reach the 1st division in 1994/95. He also would be in charge of Portugal, winning the 2003 Rink Hockey World Championship. The same year he returned briefly to competition as a player for Académico de Espinho for the season of 2003/04.
