= Roller hockey at the 1992 Summer Olympics =

Roller hockey at the Games of the XXV Olympiad
- Dates: July 26 to August 7
- Teams: 12

Medalists
1st place, gold medalist(s)		Argentina
2nd place, silver medalist(s)		Spain
3rd place, bronze medalist(s)		Italy

Roller hockey was one of three demonstration sports included in the official Olympic programme of the 1992 Summer Olympics, held in Barcelona. This sport's widespread popularity and the existence of top-level competitive teams in Catalonia (such as FC Barcelona and Reus Deportiu Hockey) prompted the Organizing Committee to suggest its inclusion in the Olympic programme.

The sport was held from July 26 to August 7, 1992, and it consisted of a single event for men and was contested in four venues in Catalonia: Vic, Sant Sadurní d'Anoia, Reus and Barcelona. A total of 12 nations entered a team, for a total of 120 players. The biggest contenders, Spain, Italy, Portugal and Argentina all finished in the first four places, with the Portuguese team (world champions from the 1991 Rink Hockey World Championship) failing to reach the podium, losing the third medal march to Italy, and Argentina winning the final match against the Spanish hosts. As a demonstration sports, the medals did not count to the final medal table.

In a preliminary round, the teams were divided into two groups according to the results of the 1991 Rink Hockey World Championship, held in Portugal. Group A games were played at the Pavelló del Club Patí Vic, in Vic, while Group B games were played at the Pavelló de l'Ateneu de Sant Sadurní, in Sant Sadurní d'Anoia. The best three teams of each group advanced to the semi-finals, which were played as a six-team group stage, at the Pavelló d'Esports, in Reus. In the end, the top two teams played each other in the final and the third and fourth placed teams played each other in a bronze medal match, at the Palau Blaugrana.

== Final standings ==
Rank	Team
1st place, gold medalist(s)	Argentina
2nd place, silver medalist(s)	Spain
3rd place, bronze medalist(s)	Italy
4	Portugal
5	Brazil
6	Netherlands
7	United States
8	Germany
9	Angola
10	Switzerland
11	Australia
12	Japan

== Competition ==
=== Preliminary round ===
==== Group A ====
Team	Pts	Pld	W	D	L	GF	GA
1. Italy	9	5	4	1	0	54	8
2. Portugal	8	5	4	0	1	59	8
3. Argentina	6	5	2	2	1	22	9
4. United States	5	5	2	1	2	24	27
5. Switzerland	2	5	1	0	4	12	28
6. Japan	0	5	0	0	5	4	95

==== Group B ====
Team	Pts	Pld	W	D	L	GF	GA
1. Spain	10	5	5	0	0	45	4
2. Brazil	8	5	4	0	1	27	12
3. Netherlands	5	5	2	1	2	22	24
4. Germany	4	5	2	0	3	13	17
5. Angola	3	5	1	1	3	7	23
6. Australia	0	5	0	0	5	7	42

=== Semi-finals ===
Team	Pts	Pld	W	D	L	GF	GA
1. Spain	9	5	4	1	0	19	8
2. Argentina	8	5	4	0	1	18	9
3. Portugal	6	5	3	0	2	22	12
4. Italy	4	5	2	0	3	21	19
5. Brazil	3	5	1	1	3	12	20
6. Netherlands	0	5	0	0	5	5	29

- Key: Pts – points; Pld – matches played; W – win; D – draw; L – lost; GF – goals for; GA – goals against

=== Finals ===
==== Bronze medal match ====
7 August 1992
7 August 1992	Portugal	2–3 (2–1)	Italy	Palau Blaugrana; Barcelona
7 August 1992	Luís Ferreira; Victor Hugo Silva		Francesco Amato; Massimo Mariotti; Roberto Crudeli	Palau Blaugrana; Barcelona
	Umpires: Miguel Angel Marti Corcuera (ESP) & Alfonso Mestres Torrens (ESP)

==== Gold medal match ====
7 August 1992
7 August 1992	Spain	6–8 (5–5)	Argentina	Palau Blaugrana; Barcelona
7 August 1992	A. Avecilla Porto (2); A. Rovira Lecha (2); Joan Ayats Presas; Joan Carles Colas		J. Paes Picon (3); D. Allende Martinez (2); P. Cairo Valdivia (2); R. Roldan Gomez	Palau Blaugrana; Barcelona
	Umpires: Luís Alfredo Dias Rei (POR) & João António Pereira Faria (POR)

== See also ==
- Roller Hockey World Cup
- Women's Roller Hockey World Cup
- Hockey
- Roller hockey (Quad)
- FIRS - International Roller Sports Federation
