= Water motorsports at the 1908 Summer Olympics – Class C =

Class C (6.5–8 m) motorboating at the Games of the IV Olympiad
- Venue: Southampton Water
- Date: 29 August 1908
- Competitors: 5 from 1 nation

Medalists
1st place, gold medalist(s)		Gyrinus	Great Britain

The Class C (6.5 to 8 metres) was one of three motorboating classes contested on the Water motorsports at the 1908 Summer Olympics programme. Nations could enter up to 3 boats. In addition to the length minimum and maximum, the boats had to weight at least 800 kilograms (without fuel or crew), have "a total piston area not exceeding that represented by four cylinders each of 106 mm. bore," and "comply with the rules of the International Sporting Club of Monaco in regard to cruisers."

The first race of 29 August 1908 was the small class of boats. Gyrinus, which had won the B class the day before, appeared again. This time her competition was Sea Dog. Again, however, Gyrinus was the only boat to finish, as Sea Dog experienced engine problems and had to be towed off the course.

== Results ==
Place	Boat	Boaters	Nation	Time
1st place, gold medalist(s)	Gyrinus	John Field-Richards; Bernard Boverton Redwood; Isaac Thomas Thornycroft	Great Britain	Unknown
–	Sea Dog	Thomas Weston; Warwick Wright	Great Britain	Did not finish

== Notes ==
- Cook, Theodore Andrea (1908). The Fourth Olympiad, Being the Official Report. London: British Olympic Association.
- De Wael, Herman (2001). "Motorboating 1908". Herman's Full Olympians. Archived from the original on 3 March 2016.
- OlyMADMen. "Motorboating at the 1908 London Summer Games: Mixed B-Class". Sports-Reference. Archived from the original on 18 April 2020.
