= Water motorsports at the 1908 Summer Olympics – Class B =

Class B (<60 ft) motorboating at the Games of the IV Olympiad
- Venue: Southampton Water
- Date: August 28
- Competitors: 4 from 1 nation

Medalists
1st place, gold medalist(s)		Gyrinus	Great Britain

The Class B (under 60 feet) was one of three motorboating classes contested on the Water motorsports at the 1908 Summer Olympics programme. Nations could enter up to 3 boats. In addition to the 60-foot limit, boats were limited to "a total piston area not exceeding that represented by four cylinders each of 155 mm bore."

The B class was held on 28 August, after the abortive first running of the open class. Again only two boats appeared at the starting line, Quicksilver and Gyrinus. Quicksilver became threatened by water coming in over the sides, abandoning the race. Gyrinus, a small boat with an extra crewman to bail water, was able to finish to make its crew the first Olympic champions in motorsports.

== Results ==
Place	Boat	Boaters	Nation	Time
1st place, gold medalist(s)	Gyrinus	John Field-Richards; Bernard Boverton Redwood; Isaac Thomas Thornycroft	Great Britain	Unknown
–	Quicksilver	John Marshall Gorham; Sophia Hope Gorham	Great Britain	Did not finish

== See also ==
- Cook, Theodore Andrea (1908). The Fourth Olympiad, Being the Official Report. London: British Olympic Association.
- De Wael, Herman (2001). "Motorboating 1908". Herman's Full Olympians. Archived from the original on 3 March 2016.
- OlyMADMen. "Motorboating at the 1908 London Summer Games: Mixed B-Class". Sports-Reference. Archived from the original on 18 April 2020.
