= Duff baronets =

Set index for Duff baronets

There have been three creations of baronets with the surname Duff, all in the Baronetage of the United Kingdom. Two of the creations are extinct while one is extant.

- Duff baronets of Halkin (1813): see Duff-Gordon baronets
- Assheton-Smith baronets, later Duff baronets of Vaynol Park (1911)
- Duff baronets of Hatton (1952)
