= Water motorsports at the Summer Olympics =

- IOC Code: PBT
- Governing body: UIM
- Events: 3 (mixed)

Summer Olympics
- 1896; 1900; 1904; 1908; 1912; 1920; 1924; 1928; 1932; 1936; 1948; 1952; 1956; 1960; 1964; 1968; 1972; 1976; 1980; 1984; 1988; 1992; 1996; 2000; 2004; 2008; 2012; 2016; 2020; 2024; 2028; 2032; Note: demonstration or exhibition sport years indicated in italics
- Medalists

Water motorsports was held at the Summer Olympics twice: in 1900 (the event is not considered official), and in 1908.

To date, water motorsports is the only motor sport to have ever been an official Olympic event. Motor sports were subsequently prohibited by the Olympic Charter, though the ban has since been lifted.

== Medal table ==
Rank	Nation	Gold	Silver	Bronze	Total
1	Great Britain	2	0	0	2
2	France	1	0	0	1
Totals (2 entries)		3	0	0	3

== See also ==
- Olympic results index#Water motorsports
