= Olympic results index =

List of each Olympic sport (Summer and Winter included)

This Olympic Games results index is a list of links to articles containing results of each Olympic sport at the Summer Olympics and Winter Olympics. Years not appearing are those when the event was not held. Years in italics mean it was a demonstration sport.

== Summer Olympics ==
The Summer Olympics was cancelled in 1916 because of World War I, and in 1940 and 1944 because of World War II.

- 1896
- 1900
- 1904
- 1908
- 1912
- 1920
- 1924
- 1928
- 1932
- 1936
- 1948
- 1952
- 1956
- 1960
- 1964
- 1968
- 1972
- 1976
- 1980
- 1984
- 1988
- 1992
- 1996
- 2000
- 2004
- 2008
- 2012
- 2016
- 2020
- 2024

=== Archery ===
- 1900
- 1904
- 1908
- 1920
- 1972
- 1976
- 1980
- 1984
- 1988
- 1992
- 1996
- 2000
- 2004
- 2008
- 2012
- 2016
- 2020
- 2024

=== Athletics ===
- 1896
- 1900
- 1904
- 1908
- 1912
- 1920
- 1924
- 1928
- 1932
- 1936
- 1948
- 1952
- 1956
- 1960
- 1964
- 1968
- 1972
- 1976
- 1980
- 1984
- 1988
- 1992
- 1996
- 2000
- 2004
- 2008
- 2012
- 2016
- 2020
- 2024

=== Badminton ===
- 1972
- 1988
- 1992
- 1996
- 2000
- 2004
- 2008
- 2012
- 2016
- 2020
- 2024

=== Baseball ===
- 1904
- 1912
- 1936
- 1952
- 1956
- 1964
- 1984
- 1988
- 1992
- 1996
- 2000
- 2004
- 2008
- 2020

=== Basketball ===
- 1904
- 1936
- 1948
- 1952
- 1956
- 1960
- 1964
- 1968
- 1972
- 1976
- 1980
- 1984
- 1988
- 1992
- 1996
- 2000
- 2004
- 2008
- 2012
- 2016
- 2020
- 2024

=== Basque pelota ===
- 1900
- 1924
- 1968
- 1992

=== Beach volleyball ===
- 1996
- 2000
- 2004
- 2008
- 2012
- 2016
- 2020
- 2024

=== Boxing ===
- 1904
- 1908
- 1920
- 1924
- 1928
- 1932
- 1936
- 1948
- 1952
- 1956
- 1960
- 1964
- 1968
- 1972
- 1976
- 1980
- 1984
- 1988
- 1992
- 1996
- 2000
- 2004
- 2008
- 2012
- 2016
- 2020
- 2024

=== Canoeing and kayaking ===
- 1924
- 1936
- 1948
- 1952
- 1956
- 1960
- 1964
- 1968
- 1972
- 1976
- 1980
- 1984
- 1988
- 1992
- 1996
- 2000
- 2004
- 2008
- 2012
- 2016
- 2020
- 2024

=== Cricket ===
- 1900

=== Croquet ===
- 1900

=== Cycling ===
- 1896
- 1900
- 1904
- 1908
- 1912
- 1920
- 1924
- 1928
- 1932
- 1936
- 1948
- 1952
- 1956
- 1960
- 1964
- 1968
- 1972
- 1976
- 1980
- 1984
- 1988
- 1992
- 1996
- 2000
- 2004
- 2008
- 2012
- 2016
- 2020
- 2024

=== Diving ===
Including plunge for distance (1904 only).
- 1904
- 1908
- 1912
- 1920
- 1924
- 1928
- 1932
- 1936
- 1948
- 1952
- 1956
- 1960
- 1964
- 1968
- 1972
- 1976
- 1980
- 1984
- 1988
- 1992
- 1996
- 2000
- 2004
- 2008
- 2012
- 2016
- 2020
- 2024

=== Equestrian ===
- 1900
- 1908
- 1912
- 1920
- 1924
- 1928
- 1932
- 1936
- 1948
- 1952
- 1956
- 1960
- 1964
- 1968
- 1972
- 1976
- 1980
- 1984
- 1988
- 1992
- 1996
- 2000
- 2004
- 2008
- 2012
- 2016
- 2020
- 2024

=== Fencing ===
- 1896
- 1900
- 1904
- 1908
- 1912
- 1920
- 1924
- 1928
- 1932
- 1936
- 1948
- 1952
- 1956
- 1960
- 1964
- 1968
- 1972
- 1976
- 1980
- 1984
- 1988
- 1992
- 1996
- 2000
- 2004
- 2008
- 2012
- 2016
- 2020
- 2024

=== Figure skating ===
Figure skating appeared in the Summer Olympics twice, in 1908 and 1920. It became an established event of the Winter Olympics in 1924 (see below).

- 1908
- 1920

=== Football (soccer) ===
Otherwise known as association football, this event made its debut at the Olympics of 1900 and has appeared in every Olympic games since then except for 1932, after the introduction of the FIFA World Cup in 1930.

- 1900
- 1904
- 1908
- 1912
- 1920
- 1924
- 1928
- 1936
- 1948
- 1952
- 1956
- 1960
- 1964
- 1968
- 1972
- 1976
- 1980
- 1984
- 1988
- 1992
- 1996
- 2000
- 2004
- 2008
- 2012
- 2016
- 2020
- 2024

=== Golf ===
- 1900
- 1904
- 2016
- 2020
- 2024

=== Gymnastics ===
- 1896
- 1900
- 1904
- 1908
- 1912
- 1920
- 1924
- 1928
- 1932
- 1936
- 1948
- 1952
- 1956
- 1960
- 1964
- 1968
- 1972
- 1976
- 1980
- 1984
- 1988
- 1992
- 1996
- 2000
- 2004
- 2008
- 2012
- 2016
- 2020
- 2024

=== Handball ===
- 1936
- 1952
- 1972
- 1976
- 1980
- 1984
- 1988
- 1992
- 1996
- 2000
- 2004
- 2008
- 2012
- 2016
- 2020
- 2024

=== Hockey (field) ===
- 1908
- 1920
- 1928
- 1932
- 1936
- 1948
- 1952
- 1956
- 1960
- 1964
- 1968
- 1972
- 1976
- 1980
- 1984
- 1988
- 1992
- 1996
- 2000
- 2004
- 2008
- 2012
- 2016
- 2020
- 2024

=== Ice hockey ===
Ice hockey appeared only once in the Summer Olympics. It became part of the Winter Olympics from 1924 onwards (see below).

- 1920

=== Jeu de paume ===
- 1900
- 1908
- 1924

=== Judo ===
- 1964
- 1972
- 1976
- 1980
- 1984
- 1988
- 1992
- 1996
- 2000
- 2004
- 2008
- 2012
- 2016
- 2020
- 2024

=== Lacrosse ===
- 1904
- 1908
- 1928
- 1932
- 1948

=== Modern pentathlon ===
- 1912
- 1920
- 1924
- 1928
- 1932
- 1936
- 1948
- 1952
- 1956
- 1960
- 1964
- 1968
- 1972
- 1976
- 1980
- 1984
- 1988
- 1992
- 1996
- 2000
- 2004
- 2008
- 2012
- 2016
- 2020
- 2024

=== Polo ===
- 1900
- 1908
- 1920
- 1924
- 1936

=== Rackets ===
- 1908

=== Roque ===
- 1904

=== Rowing ===
- 1900
- 1904
- 1908
- 1912
- 1920
- 1924
- 1928
- 1932
- 1936
- 1948
- 1952
- 1956
- 1960
- 1964
- 1968
- 1972
- 1976
- 1980
- 1984
- 1988
- 1992
- 1996
- 2000
- 2004
- 2008
- 2012
- 2016
- 2020
- 2024

=== Rugby union ===
The event was rugby union until 1924 and rugby sevens since 2016.

- 1900
- 1908
- 1920
- 1924
- 2016
- 2020
- 2024

=== Sailing ===
- 1896
- 1900
- 1908
- 1912
- 1920
- 1924
- 1928
- 1932
- 1936
- 1948
- 1952
- 1956
- 1960
- 1964
- 1968
- 1972
- 1976
- 1980
- 1984
- 1988
- 1992
- 1996
- 2000
- 2004
- 2008
- 2012
- 2016
- 2020
- 2024

=== Shooting ===
- 1896
- 1900
- 1908
- 1912
- 1920
- 1924
- 1932
- 1936
- 1948
- 1952
- 1956
- 1960
- 1964
- 1968
- 1972
- 1976
- 1980
- 1984
- 1988
- 1992
- 1996
- 2000
- 2004
- 2008
- 2012
- 2016
- 2020
- 2024

=== Softball ===
- 1996
- 2000
- 2004
- 2008
- 2020

=== Swimming ===
- 1896
- 1900
- 1904
- 1908
- 1912
- 1920
- 1924
- 1928
- 1932
- 1936
- 1948
- 1952
- 1956
- 1960
- 1964
- 1968
- 1972
- 1976
- 1980
- 1984
- 1988
- 1992
- 1996
- 2000
- 2004
- 2008
- 2012
- 2016
- 2020
- 2024

=== Synchronized swimming ===
- 1984
- 1988
- 1992
- 1996
- 2000
- 2004
- 2008
- 2012
- 2016
- 2020
- 2024

=== Table tennis ===
Despite its worldwide popularity, table tennis did not appear in the Olympics until 1988.

- 1988
- 1992
- 1996
- 2000
- 2004
- 2008
- 2012
- 2016
- 2020
- 2024

=== Taekwondo ===
- 1988
- 1992
- 2000
- 2004
- 2008
- 2012
- 2016
- 2020
- 2024

=== Tennis ===
- 1896
- 1900
- 1904
- 1908
- 1912
- 1920
- 1924
- 1968
- 1984
- 1988
- 1992
- 1996
- 2000
- 2004
- 2008
- 2012
- 2016
- 2020
- 2024

=== Triathlon ===
- 2000
- 2004
- 2008
- 2012
- 2016
- 2020
- 2024

=== Tug of war ===
- 1900
- 1904
- 1908
- 1912
- 1920

=== Volleyball ===
- 1964
- 1968
- 1972
- 1976
- 1980
- 1984
- 1988
- 1992
- 1996
- 2000
- 2004
- 2008
- 2012
- 2016
- 2020
- 2024

=== Water motorsports ===
- 1900
- 1908

=== Water polo ===
- 1900
- 1904
- 1908
- 1912
- 1920
- 1924
- 1928
- 1932
- 1936
- 1948
- 1952
- 1956
- 1960
- 1964
- 1968
- 1972
- 1976
- 1980
- 1984
- 1988
- 1992
- 1996
- 2000
- 2004
- 2008
- 2012
- 2016
- 2020
- 2024

=== Weightlifting ===
- 1896
- 1904
- 1920
- 1924
- 1928
- 1932
- 1936
- 1948
- 1952
- 1956
- 1960
- 1964
- 1968
- 1972
- 1976
- 1980
- 1984
- 1988
- 1992
- 1996
- 2000
- 2004
- 2008
- 2012
- 2016
- 2020
- 2024

=== Wrestling ===
- 1896
- 1904
- 1908
- 1912
- 1920
- 1924
- 1928
- 1932
- 1936
- 1948
- 1952
- 1956
- 1960
- 1964
- 1968
- 1972
- 1976
- 1980
- 1984
- 1988
- 1992
- 1996
- 2000
- 2004
- 2008
- 2012
- 2016
- 2020
- 2024

== Winter Olympics ==
The Winter Olympics was cancelled in 1940 and 1944 because of World War II.

- 1924
- 1928
- 1932
- 1936
- 1948
- 1952
- 1956
- 1960
- 1964
- 1968
- 1972
- 1976
- 1980
- 1984
- 1988
- 1992
- 1994
- 1998
- 2002
- 2006
- 2010
- 2014
- 2018
- 2022

=== Alpine skiing ===
- 1936
- 1948
- 1952
- 1956
- 1960
- 1964
- 1968
- 1972
- 1976
- 1980
- 1984
- 1988
- 1992
- 1994
- 1998
- 2002
- 2006
- 2010
- 2014
- 2018
- 2022

=== Bandy ===
1952 (demonstration sport only)

=== Biathlon ===
- 1924
- 1928
- 1936
- 1948
- 1960
- 1964
- 1968
- 1972
- 1976
- 1980
- 1984
- 1988
- 1992
- 1994
- 1998
- 2002
- 2006
- 2010
- 2014
- 2018
- 2022

=== Bobsleigh ===
- 1924
- 1928
- 1932
- 1936
- 1948
- 1952
- 1956
- 1964
- 1968
- 1972
- 1976
- 1980
- 1984
- 1988
- 1992
- 1994
- 1998
- 2002
- 2006
- 2010
- 2014
- 2018
- 2022

=== Cross-country skiing ===
- 1924
- 1928
- 1932
- 1936
- 1948
- 1952
- 1956
- 1960
- 1964
- 1968
- 1972
- 1976
- 1980
- 1984
- 1988
- 1992
- 1994
- 1998
- 2002
- 2006
- 2010
- 2014
- 2018
- 2022

=== Curling ===
- 1924
- 1932
- 1988
- 1992
- 1998
- 2002
- 2006
- 2010
- 2014
- 2018
- 2022

=== Figure skating (including ice dancing from 1976) ===
Figure skating appeared twice in the Summer Olympics, in 1908 and 1920 (see above).

- 1924
- 1928
- 1932
- 1936
- 1948
- 1952
- 1956
- 1960
- 1964
- 1968
- 1972
- 1976
- 1980
- 1984
- 1988
- 1992
- 1994
- 1998
- 2002
- 2006
- 2010
- 2014
- 2018
- 2022

=== Freestyle skiing ===
- 1988
- 1992
- 1994
- 1998
- 2002
- 2006
- 2010
- 2014
- 2018
- 2022

=== Ice hockey ===
Ice hockey appeared once in the Summer Olympics, in 1920 (see above).

- 1924
- 1928
- 1932
- 1936
- 1948
- 1952
- 1956
- 1960
- 1964
- 1968
- 1972
- 1976
- 1980
- 1984
- 1988
- 1992
- 1994
- 1998
- 2002
- 2006
- 2010
- 2014
- 2018
- 2022

=== Luge ===
- 1964
- 1968
- 1972
- 1976
- 1980
- 1984
- 1988
- 1992
- 1994
- 1998
- 2002
- 2006
- 2010
- 2014
- 2018
- 2022

=== Nordic combined ===
- 1924
- 1928
- 1932
- 1936
- 1948
- 1952
- 1956
- 1960
- 1964
- 1968
- 1972
- 1976
- 1980
- 1984
- 1988
- 1992
- 1994
- 1998
- 2002
- 2006
- 2010
- 2014
- 2018
- 2022

=== Short track speed skating ===
- 1988
- 1992
- 1994
- 1998
- 2002
- 2006
- 2010
- 2014
- 2018
- 2022

=== Skeleton ===
- 1928
- 1948
- 2002
- 2006
- 2010
- 2014
- 2018
- 2022

=== Ski jumping ===
- 1924
- 1928
- 1932
- 1936
- 1948
- 1952
- 1956
- 1960
- 1964
- 1968
- 1972
- 1976
- 1980
- 1984
- 1988
- 1992
- 1994
- 1998
- 2002
- 2006
- 2010
- 2014
- 2018
- 2022

=== Snowboarding ===
- 1998
- 2002
- 2006
- 2010
- 2014
- 2018
- 2022

=== Speed skating ===
- 1924
- 1928
- 1932
- 1936
- 1948
- 1952
- 1956
- 1960
- 1964
- 1968
- 1972
- 1976
- 1980
- 1984
- 1988
- 1992
- 1994
- 1998
- 2002
- 2006
- 2010
- 2014
- 2018
- 2022

== See also ==
- Paralympic results index
