= Mixed-sex sports =

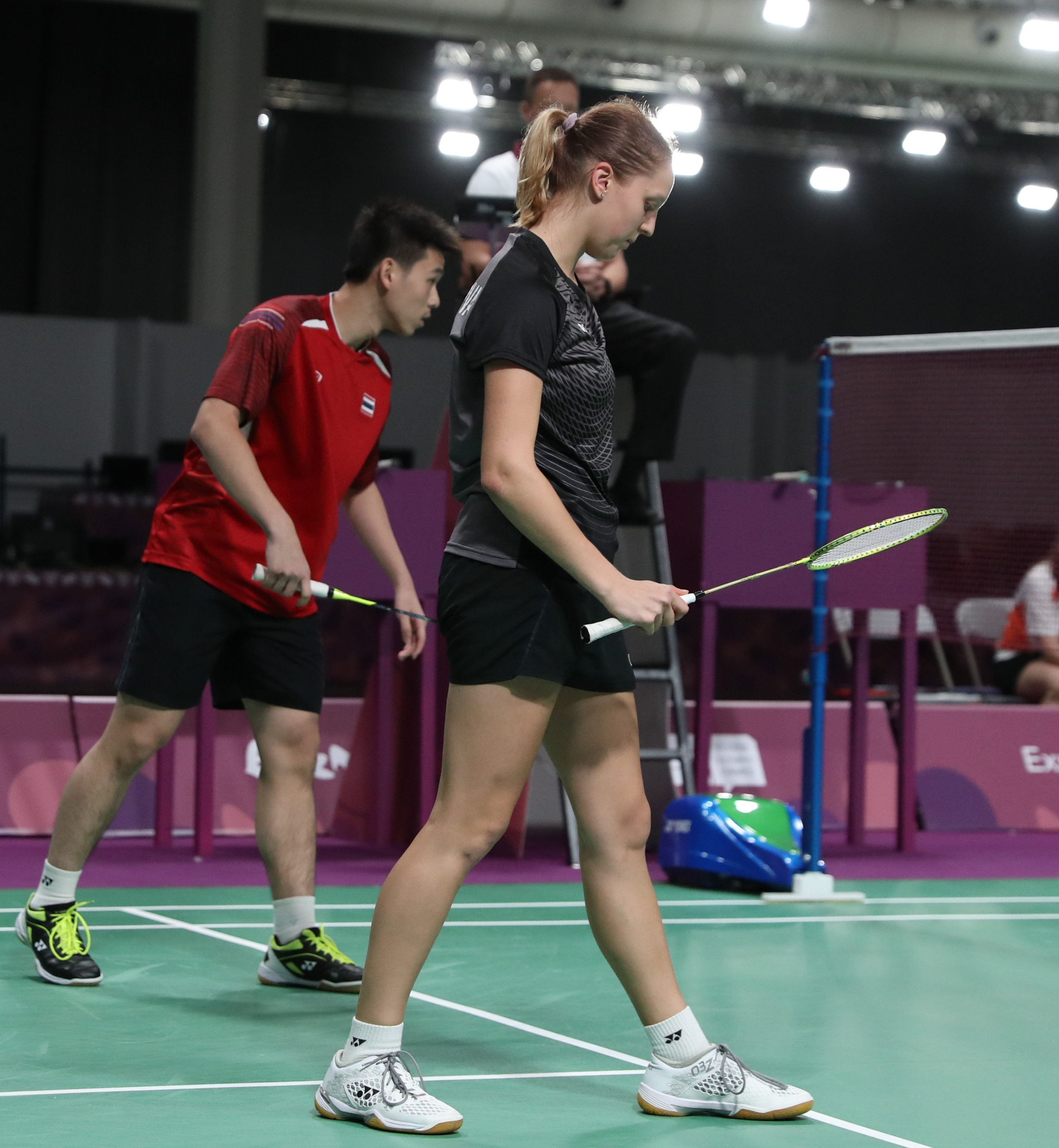
A mixed-gender badminton match

Mixed-sex sports (also known as coed sports) are individual and team sports whose participants are not of a single sex. In many organised sports settings, rules dictate an equal number of people of each sex in a team (for example teams of one man and one woman). Usually, the main purpose of these rules is to account for physiological sex differences. Mixed-sex sports in informal settings are typically groups of neighbours, friends or family playing without regard to the sex of the participants. Mixed-sex play is also common in youth sports as before puberty and adolescence, sport-relevant sex differences affect performance far less.

There are multiple dynamics to mixed-sex sports teams. Where sex differences in human physiology do not play a significant role in a person's proficiency in a sport, then men and women may compete in a single open class, as in equestrian sports. When sex is a major factor in a competitor's performance, sports will typically split men and women into separate divisions, but there may be mixed-sex team variants, such as mixed doubles. In artistic judged sports, these physical differences play a key role in performances, as demonstrated in pair figure skating and acrobatic gymnastics.

Mixed-sex sport events may be organised to achieve certain social aims, such as boosting female participation in sport, as a form of exercise, or to improve social harmony between the sexes.

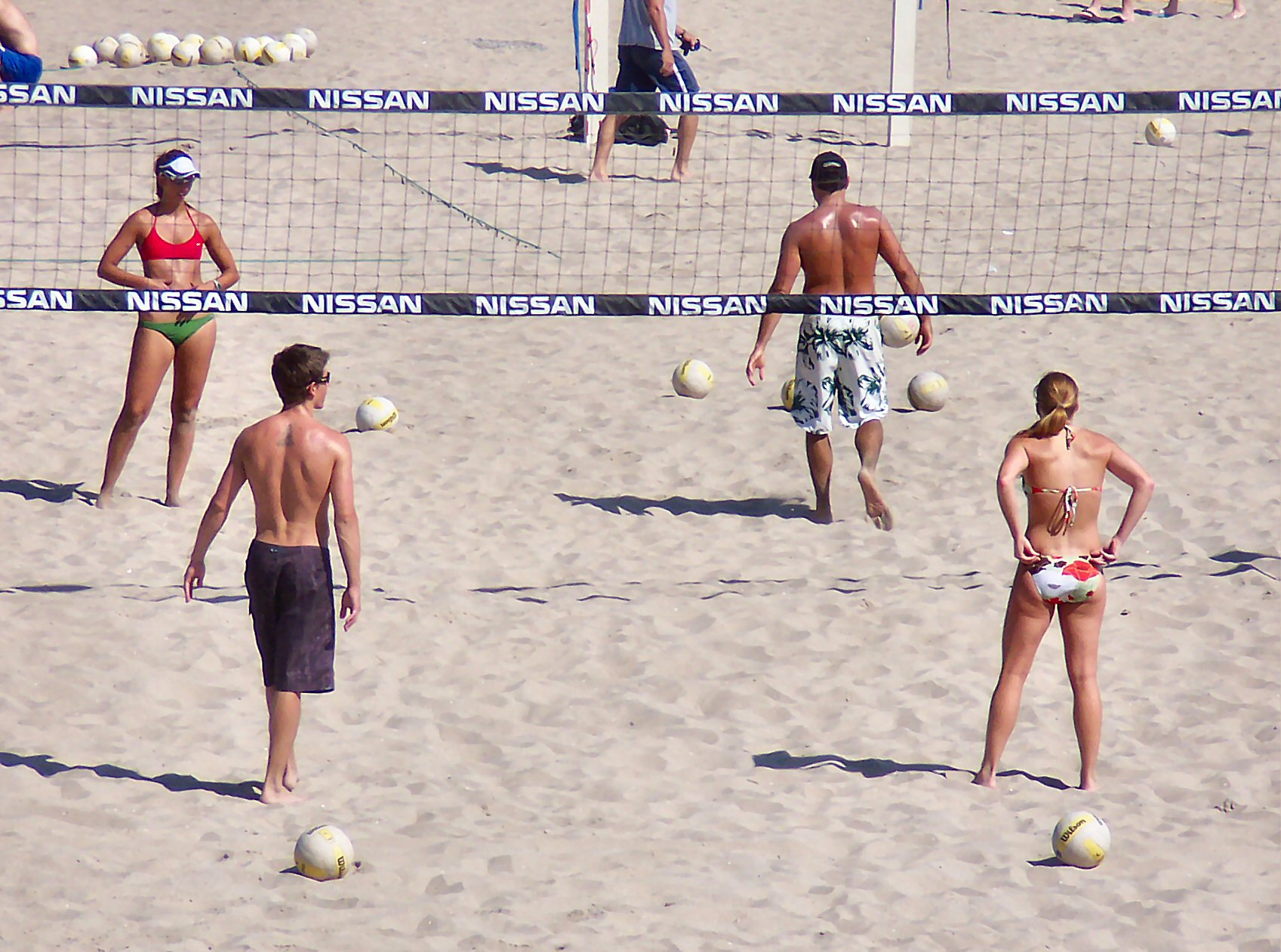
An unofficial mixed doubles match of beach volleyball.

== Direct competition ==
It is uncommon in most organised sports to find individuals of both sexes competing head-to-head due to physiological differences. This is to ensure equal opportunity for both males and females to participate in fair sporting competition because of the divergence in physical capacity for athletic achievement. Young children often participate in mixed-sex sports leagues because the physical differences between males and females are not as pronounced before the age of puberty. Male puberty confers a measurable physical advantage on athletic performance, and male performance in athletic events begins to exceed that of age-matched females during early adolescence. Additionally, many non-contact sports separate men and women in competitive settings. Due to historical gender biases against women and lower levels of female participation, as well as the differences in physical capacity, these sports often maintain a female-only category while offering an open category for both men and women.

In most forms of motorsport, men and women are allowed to compete in direct competition. Female competitors who have achieved wins at the highest levels of motorsport include Danica Patrick, Ellen Lohr and Michèle Mouton, with Mouton finishing runner-up in the 1982 World Rally Championship. There are some series which are female only in an effort to promote women in motorsport, most notably the former W Series and F1 Academy. However, these series have caught criticism for segregating female drivers as opposed to supporting them in their own campaigns.

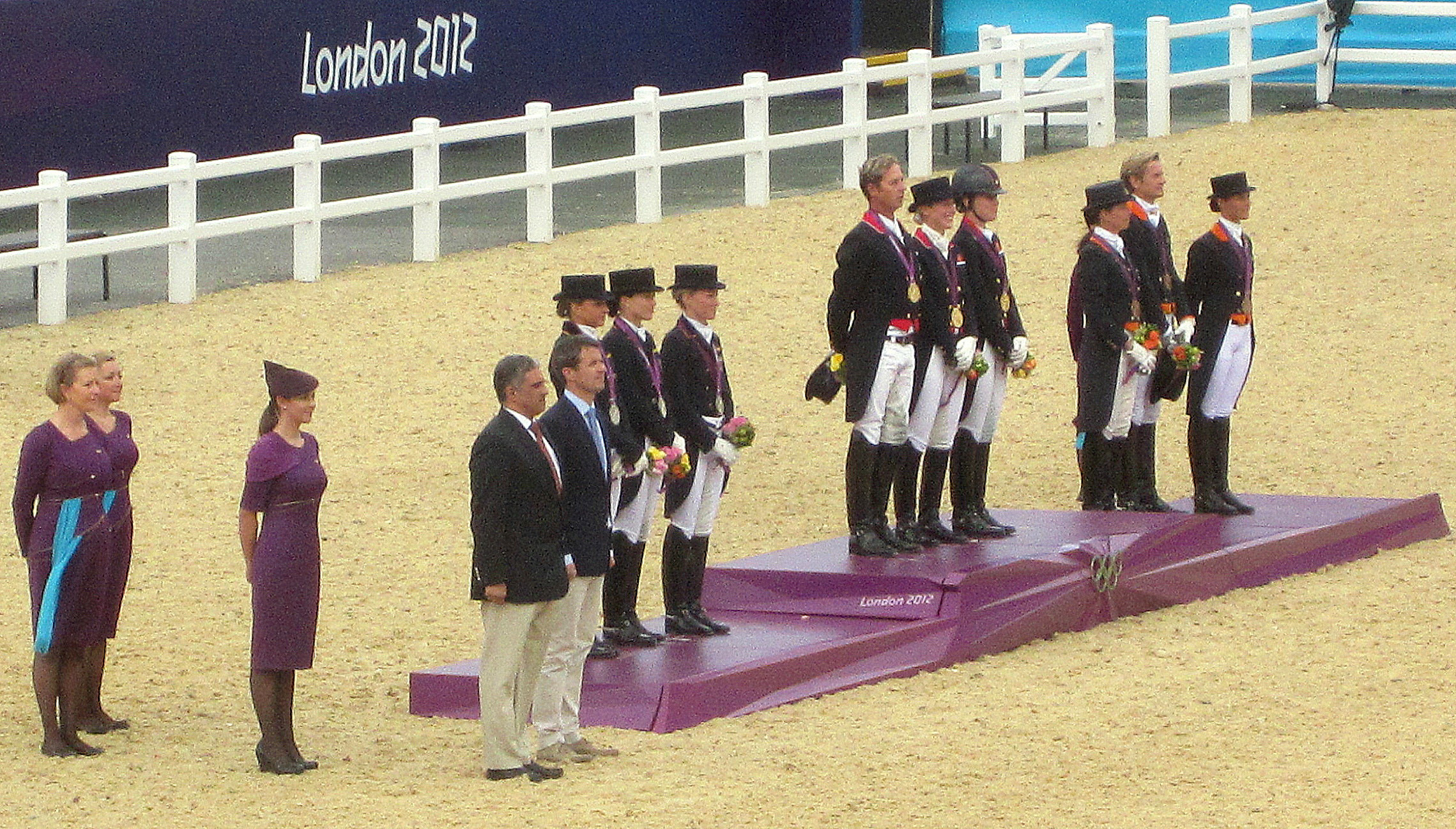
Equestrian at the 2012 Summer Olympics – Team dressage, 7 of 9 medalists are women

In equestrian sports, male and female riders compete against each other in eventing, dressage and show jumping disciplines. Female jockeys compete alongside male ones in horse racing, though they constitute a minority of jockeys overall. Beyond the human athletes, male and female horses are found in racing, with a roughly 60/40 split at the top level between colts and fillies.

In snooker, the professional tour is open to men and women, with for instance four female players competing on the main tour in 2023/24 (Reanne Evans, Mink Nutcharut, Rebecca Kenna and Baipat Siripaporn). In addition, the separate women-only tour encourages female participation in the sport.

In hard court bike polo, players, regardless of sex, compete against each other, in teams of 3, in every day play and in tournaments. There is normally no stipulation on sex, but to encourage diversity some tournaments require all teams to included a mixture of sexes or genders.

In croquet, three women have won the British Association Croquet Open Championship: Lily Gower in 1905, Dorothy Steel in 1925, 1933, 1935 and 1936, and Hope Rotherham in 1960. In 2018, two international Golf Croquet championships open to both sexes were won by women: Rachel Gee of England beat Pierre Beaudry to win the European Golf Croquet championship, and Hanan Rashad of Egypt beat Yasser Fathy (also from Egypt) to win the World over-50s championship.

The mixed division is a staple of Ultimate (without being the standard)—it is the only division showcased at both the 2013 and 2017 World Games. Seven-player mixed teams (4 men plus 3 women, or 4 women plus 3 men) directly compete. While most often players mark opponents of the same gender, match-ups between people of different gender are not uncommon to see. Open divisions are common in Ultimate, where sex/gender is not explicitly relevant in team composition—although at highest competitive levels male players predominate these divisions. Accordingly, although women's divisions are also common, men's are not (only appearing in settings without open divisions).

In sport shooting, the physical demands are lower relative to other sports, though fatigue and grip may be different between sexes. Research is conflicting about the influence of sex in the performance of shooters. In 1966 the International Shooting Sport Federation published its open events as mixed. From 1968 to 1980, men and women competed together in Olympic shooting.

In the NCAA, the main governing body of college/university sports in the US, the only sport in which men and women compete against one another directly is rifle shooting. While male and female riders compete against one another in international equestrian sports, NCAA-recognized competition is open only to women, currently as part of the NCAA Emerging Sports for Women program. The NCAA awards a combined men's and women's team championship in two sports—fencing and skiing—but all individual bouts or races involve members of the same sex, and teams field separate men's and women's squads.

The coxswain in a rowing crew can usually be of either sex while the rowers are separated by sex.

In dog sled racing, male and female mushers are in direct competition. About 1/3rd of mushers in the Iditarod are female, and finishers in the top ten are proportionately split by gender.

== Mixed doubles or pairs ==
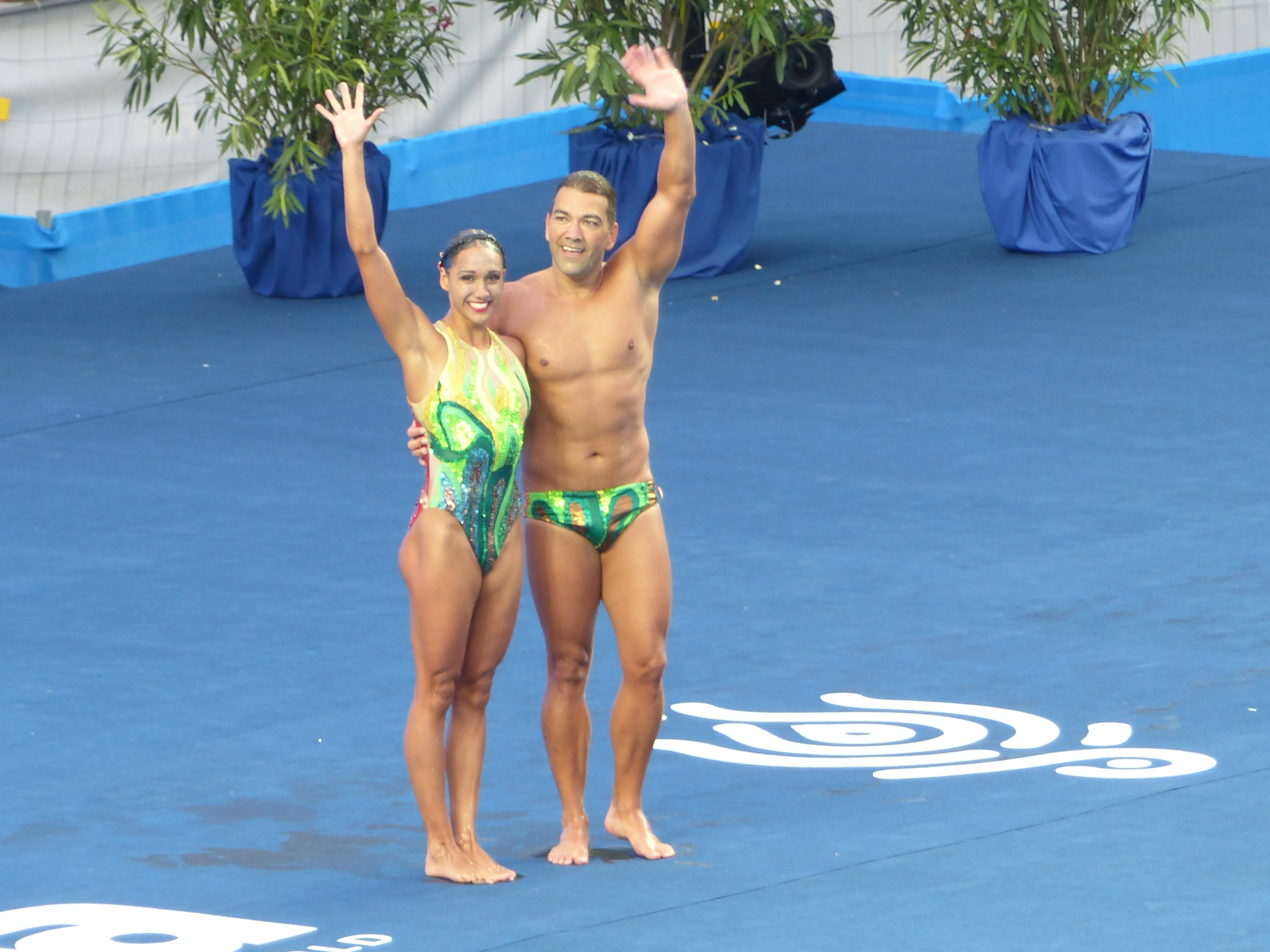
A mixed-sex pair, participating in FINA World Championships of synchronised swimming, waves to the crowd before diving into water.

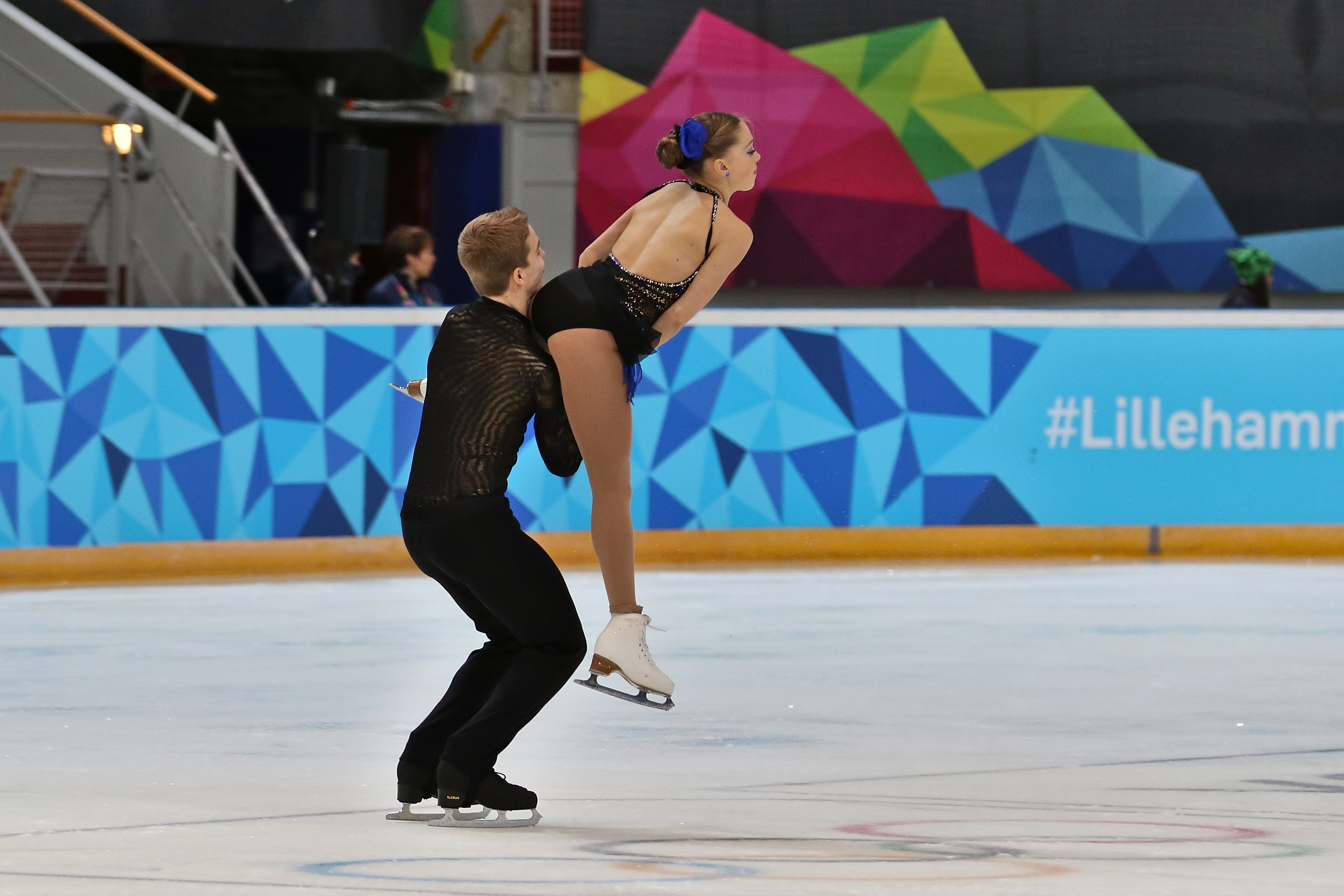
Canadians Justine Brasseur and Mathieu Ostiguy competing as a mixed-sex pair in figure skating.

A common form of mixed-sex event is for pairs of one male and one female.

Sports based on dancing usually have male/female pairings, such as ice dancing, pair figure skating, ballroom dancing and synchronised swimming duets. In these sports/events, the male and female participants physically work together (often to music) to jointly produce an artistic athletic performance. Similarly, taekwondo poomsae, which is performance-based, also has a mixed pair event.

Mixed doubles are events where two mixed-sex pairs directly compete (that is, all four competitors are in open play as two teams). This is particularly found in racket sports (which rarely have larger teams), including tennis, table tennis, badminton, squash and racquetball.

Pairs may also compete in turn-based games: one format (out of many) alternates the woman and man of each pair just as the competing sides alternate, so each round has four turns of individual action. Well-suited to strategy-based sports (such as mixed doubles curling, mixed golf, mixed bowling, mixed team darts) where players can beneficially undertake mental planning or assessment while waiting for their turn. Separate male and female performances may also be scored then added to produce mixed team results in such sports as diving. Synchronised diving is also found in mixed-sex format. In professional wrestling, mixed tag team matches do not explicitly alternate in a turn-based manner but each wrestler only faces their opponent of the same sex (switching occurs at players' discretion).

== Mixed relay ==
In non-vehicular racing sports the physiological differences between the sexes often preclude head-to-head competition between people of different sexes at the elite level. Mixed-sex events are often held though with a relay race format.

In running, a mixed 4 × 400 metres relay race was introduced at the 2017 IAAF World Relays, and added to the 2019 World Athletics Championships (details) and 2020 Summer Olympics (details). In addition, a 2 × 2 × 400 m and shuttle hurdles mixed relay races were introduced at the 2019 IAAF World Relays. The Match Europe v USA in 2019 had a mixed 200+200+400+800 m sprint medley relay.

In cross country running, a 4 × 2 km mixed relay race was added at the 2017 IAAF World Cross Country Championships.

In swimming, mixed relay races were introduced at the 2014 FINA World Swimming Championships (25 m) (4 × 50 m freestyle and medley), the 2015 World Aquatics Championships (4 × 100 m freestyle and medley), and the 2020 Summer Olympics (4 × 100 m medley). In open water swimming, mixed-gendered relays were introduced at the 2011 World Aquatics Championships (4 × 1250 m).

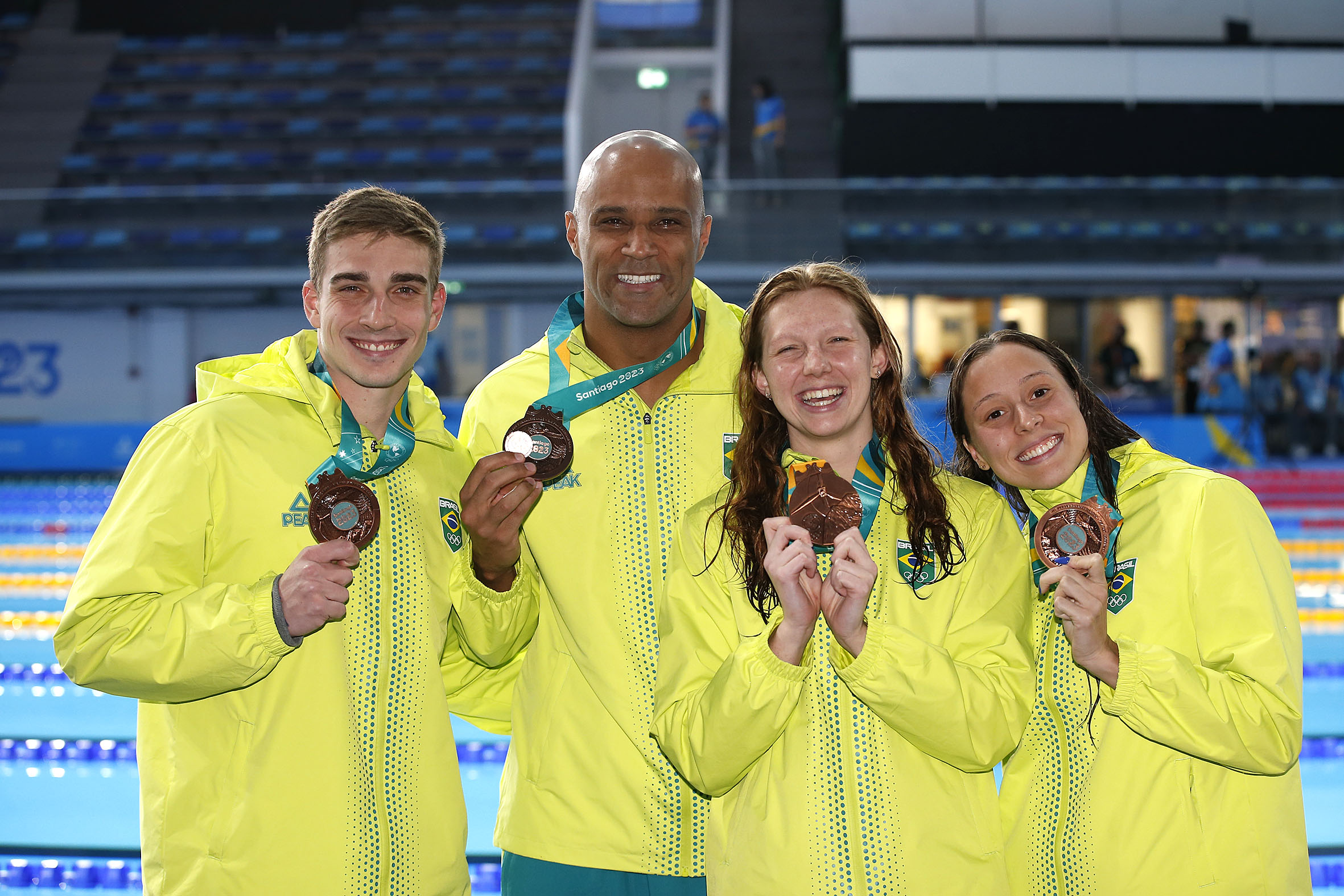
Brazil 4x100 mixed medley swimming team at the 2023 Pan American Games

In triathlon, the ITU Triathlon Mixed Relay World Championships mixed relay race has been held since 2009. Also, the triathlon at the Youth Olympic Games has a mixed relay race since 2010, and the event was introduced at the 2020 Summer Olympics (details). As in standard triathlons, each triathlon competitor must do a segment of swimming, cycling and running.

In biathlon, a mixed relay race was first held at the Biathlon World Championships 2005 in Khanty-Mansiysk (4 × 6 km), and it was added to the 2014 Winter Olympics (4 × 6 km / 7.5 km).

In road cycling, the 2019 UCI Road World Championships introduced a team time trial mixed relay where first three men and then three women ride together as a national team. Distances vary in road cycling. The 2019 race was 2 × 14 km.

In mountain biking, the UCI Mountain Bike World Championships has a mixed team relay race since 1999.

In Cyclo-cross, the UCI Cyclo-cross World Championships has a mixed team relay race since 2022. The Cyclo-cross mixed relay event is also a mixed age category event where each relay team consists of three men and three women riders where a set amount of riders are from Junior and Under-23 age categories.

== Mixed team sports ==
In adventure racing teams of 4 must include at least 1 member of the opposite sex. Archery also incorporates mixed-team competition (which can also be seen at the Olympic level).

In a number of countries, club underwater hockey is mixed-sex with any ratio of sex allowed. However, national teams usually compete in single sex teams.

=== Mixed team ball sports ===
Mixed-sex forms of ball sports involve set numbers of each sex per team, sometimes defining the roles in the team by sex/gender (examples include korfball, Baseball, coed softball, quadball, dodgeball, touch/tag rugby, American flag rugby, flag football, wheelchair handball, and wheelchair rugby, wheelchair rugby league, and Netball).

== Olympics ==
=== Ancient ===
Sports were almost never mixed in any way in ancient Greece. Women were forbidden from competing in or even viewing the ancient Olympic games. (Note: Penalty was being thrown from the cliffs of Mount Typaion.) They competed at the separate Heraean Games, from which men were excluded. Although taking place in the same stadium as the Olympic games and also every four years, it was an unrelated festival (of Hera) with fewer sport events, none of which exactly matched Olympic counterparts. Olympic winners were honoured in the Sanctuary of Zeus; Heraean winners at the Temple of Hera (where since 1936 the modern movement has lit and kept the Olympic Flame).

=== Modern ===
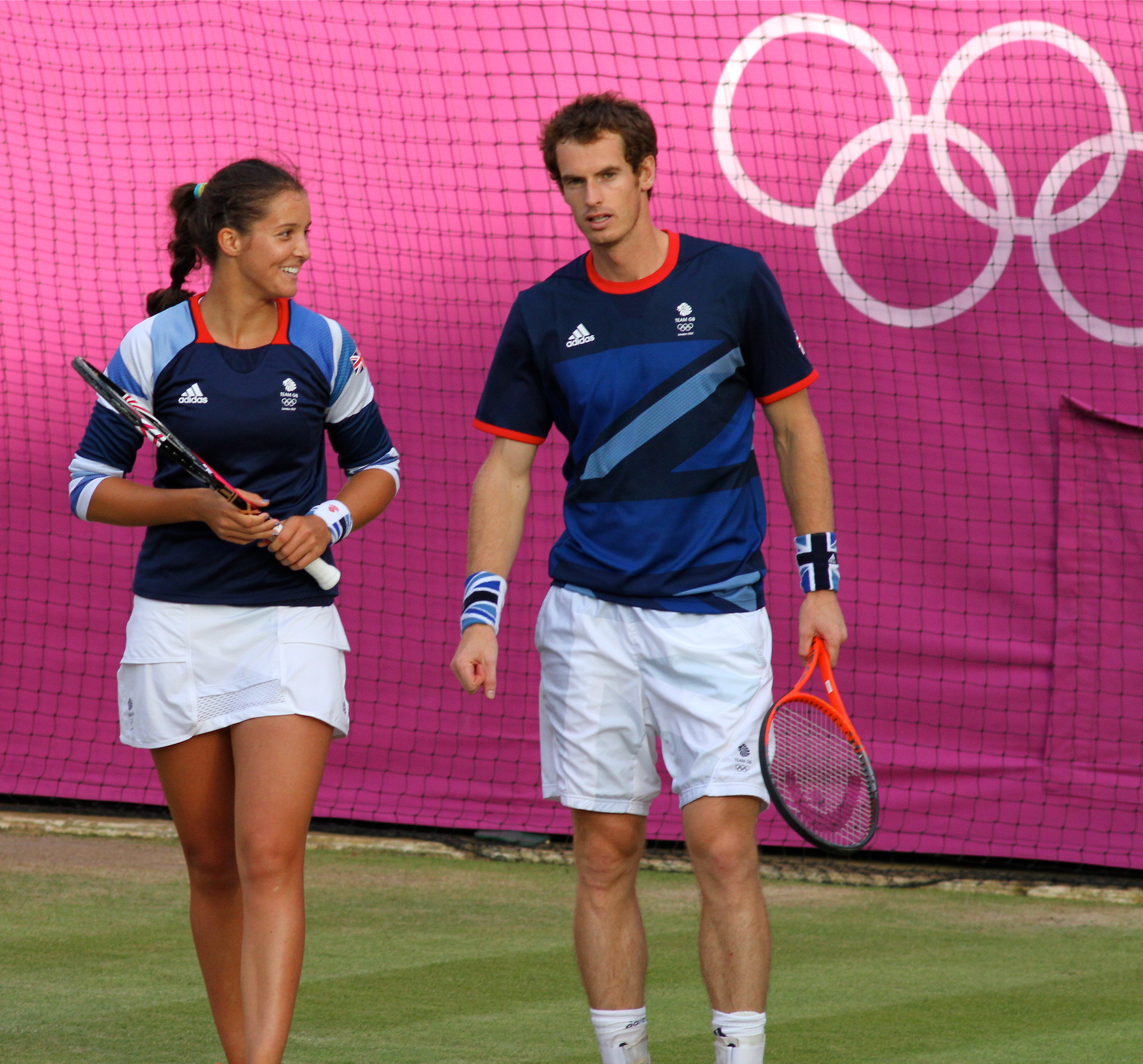
Andy Murray and Laura Robson competing in the tennis mixed doubles event at the 2012 Summer Olympics.

Mixed-sex sport has a long history at the modern Olympic Games, dating back to the 1900 Summer Olympics (the first in which women participated). Two women competed against men in equestrian events, the croquet competition was mixed-sex, and Hélène de Pourtalès was the sole female sailor, achieving the Olympics' first mixed-sex team champion as part of the gold medal-winning Swiss team. The sole time Olympic motorboating was held (1908), Sophia Gorham took part in a mixed British team.

Mixed doubles tennis was first contested in 1900 but fell off the programme after 1924 before being reintroduced in 2012. Mixed doubles badminton was introduced in 1996.

Pair figure skating was present at the summer games in 1908 and 1920 before continuing as a founding event at the first Winter Olympic Games. Ice dancing expanded the mixed figure skating programme in 1976.

Sailing at the Summer Olympics was mostly mixed-sex up to 1988 but grew increasingly divided, with no mixed sailing events being held in 2012.

Shooting at the Summer Olympics continued on a mixed basis in several events from 1968 to 1992, before competitors were restricted by sex. In 1992, Zhang Shan became the first woman to win the gold medal in Olympic shooting.

There was an increased focus on mixed-sex competition at the start of the 21st century, with new introductions including mixed biathlon relay, team figure skating, and luge mixed team relay in 2014, then Nacra 17 in 2016, and mixed doubles curling and mixed team alpine skiing in 2018. Mixed team shooting events and table tennis mixed doubles are set for inauguration at the 2020 Summer Olympics. Mixed-sex relay events are also slated for the 2020 athletics and swimming programmes. These changes resulted from an International Olympic Committee initiative to increase women's participation towards parity with men's – the recasting of men's events as mixed-sex ones was a part of this initiative. Ski jumping competitions also include mixed team events.

Baseball5 will be played at the 2026 Summer Youth Olympics, and will be the first Olympic team sport involving mixed-sex teams.

== Transgender inclusion ==
In the 2020s, in response to transgender controversies in sports, several international and national sports federations prohibited transgender athletes from competing in the female category and (sometimes) created a separate "open" category to allow for transgender, non-binary or cisgender male athletes to participate, including the British Triathlon Federation, International Swimming Federation (FINA) and British Cycling.

Such open categories have been criticized by transgender athletes and LGBT rights activists as transphobic. In addition, few athletes have signed up for open-category competitions, such as that for the 2023 World Aquatics Swimming World Cup.

== Women playing in men's sports ==
Several women have been selected by or played on teams which are otherwise men-only, including:

- Toni Stone, American baseball player in the Negro leagues
- Ellen Fokkema, Dutch soccer player for VV Foarut. Her petition to the Royal Dutch Football Association opened men's teams to women up to the Tweede Divisie for a one-season pilot.
- Yuki Nagasato, Japanese soccer player in the Kanagawa Prefecture League
- The Calgary Foothills of the Premier Development League attempted to sign up Stephanie Labbé, a Canadian soccer player, but was blocked by the league on gender grounds.
- Mexican soccer player Maribel Dominguez was selected by Atlético Celaya but blocked by FIFA.
- Mireia Rodríguez, Spanish handball player on Club Balonmano Albacete
- Eri Yoshida, Japanese baseball player for Kobe Cruise 9 in the Kansai Independent League and the Chico Outlaws in the North American Baseball League
- Charlotte Cagigos, French ice hockey player for Drakkars, a Division 1 team
- Manon Rhéaume, Canadian ice hockey player in the National Hockey League
- Shannon Szabados, Canadian ice hockey player
- Florence Schelling, Swiss ice hockey player
- Fabiola da Silva, Brazilian inline skate champion, competing against men in vert under the so-called "Fabiola rule" of the Aggressive Skaters Association

== Exhibition matches ==
Exhibition matches are sometimes arranged between a woman and man in sports where women are not competitive with men at elite level. An elite woman may compete against a man outside the elite, the match may have special rules favoring the woman, or the man may deliberately perform below his normal level. In tennis, such matches have been called "Battle of the Sexes". Intergender wrestling is acted as if competitive but is staged and choreographed like other types of professional wrestling.

== See also ==
- Mixed-sex education
- Sex segregation
- Women's sports
- Women's professional sports
