= Theophilus Redwood =

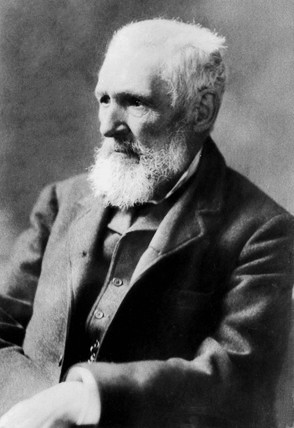

Theophilus Redwood (9 April 1806 – 5 March 1892) was a Welsh pharmacist who was one of the founding members of the Royal Pharmaceutical Society of Great Britain. He was born in Boverton, Llantwit Major.

In 1820 he was apprenticed to his brother-in-law, Charles Vachell, a surgeon-apothecary in Cardiff. Vachell had married Redwood's eldest half-sister Margaret in 1811.

Redwood translated Karl Friedrich Mohr's Lehrbuch der pharmaceutischen Technik, and adapted it to English practice. This was the first textbook of pharmacy. The result was Practical Pharmacy: The Arrangements, Apparatus, and Manipulation of the Pharmaceutical Shop and Laboratory, by Francis Mohr and Theophilus Redwood, Taylor, Walton, and Maberly, London, 1849. William Procter, Jr. edited an American edition for publisher Lea and Blanchard of Philadelphia. Procter's Practical Pharmacy was published in 1849.

He was also Secretary of the Cavendish Society (1846–72) and Vice-President of the Chemical Society.

Theophilius Redwood was never President of the Royal Pharmaceutical Society, but was President of the British Pharmaceutical Conferences in Glasgow and Plymouth, 1876 and 77. He was also President of the International Pharmaceutical conference held in London in 1881.

After his retirement in 1885, he received the title of Emeritus Professor by unanimous vote of the Council of the Pharmaceutical Society. He moved back to the family home in Boverton, which he had inherited, but still continued to lecture. His last public appearance was appropriately at the Pharmaceutical Conference in Cardiff in 1891, as he himself remarked, a very different Cardiff from the one he had left in 1823. He died at home on 5 March 1892 and is buried in the Llantwit Major churchyard.

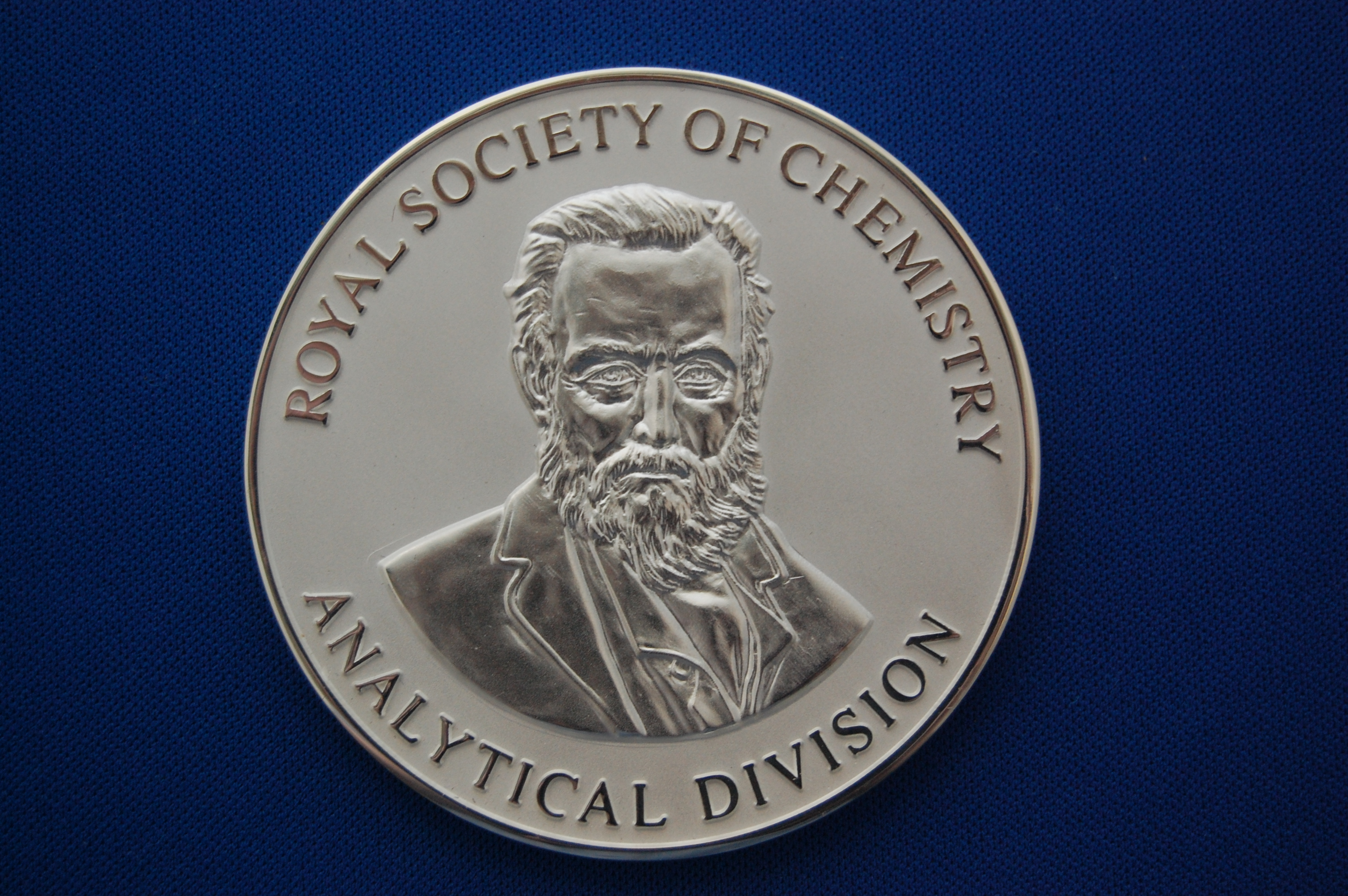
Theophilus Redwood Award medal (2014)

The Theophilus Redwood Award is given by Royal Society of Chemistry to a leading analytical chemistry scientist who is also an outstanding communicator. The Redwood Building of Cardiff University, home to the Cardiff School of Pharmacy and Pharmaceutical Sciences, is named in his honour.

== Family ==
He was married to Charlotte Elizabeth Moron, daughter of T N R Moron who owned a large pharmaceutical company in London.

Their eight children included Thomas Boverton Redwood first of the Redwood baronets.
