= Duff baronets of Hatton (1952) =

Extinct baronetcy

Escutcheon of Duff of Hatton, 1924 grant

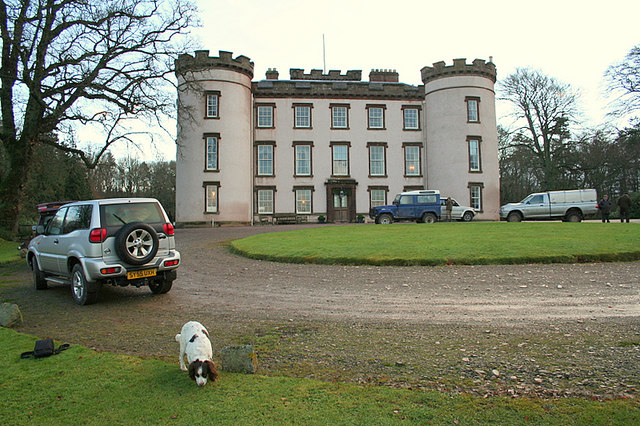
Hatton Castle, 2008 photograph

The brief Duff baronetcy, of Hatton Castle in the County of Aberdeen, was created in the Baronetage of the United Kingdom on 3 July 1952 for Garden Beauchamp Duff. The title became extinct at his death on 6 September 1952.

== Duff baronets, of Hatton (1952) ==
- Sir Garden Beauchamp Duff, 1st Baronet (1879–1952)

He was the son of the 1878 first cousin marriage of Garden Alexander Duff of Hatton (1853–1933) and Annie Isabel Urquhart (died 1910), daughter of Beauchamp Colclough Urquhart; Beauchamp Duff was his uncle, as was Beauchamp Colclough Urquhart, killed in action in 1898 at the battle of Atbara. An obituary noted that he united "in his person" the Duffs and the Urquharts of Cromarty; he was styled both Laird of Hatton and the 11th Laird of Meldrum. He was a descendant of Garden William Duff, whose younger brother Robert George Duff was the ancestor of the baronets of the 1911 creation.

From 1899 Duff was an officer of the Cameron Highlanders, serving in World War I, being awarded the DSO and attaining the rank of brevet lieutenant-colonel. He married in 1913, Doris Smith, daughter of Lindsay Eric Smith of Union of London and Smith's Bank Ltd, but left no heir.

Duff was an Aberdeenshire landowner, in 1923 taking over the Hatton estates from his father, and in 1933 inheriting the Urquhart estates at Meldrum that had passed to his mother. He chaired the local war agricultural executive committee for Deer and Turriff in World War II. As his father had been, he was a trustee of the Seafield estate, involved in the affairs of Nina Ogilvie-Grant, 12th Countess of Seafield. He was Vice-Lieutenant of Aberdeenshire from 1934.
