= Thomas Boverton Redwood =

British chemical engineer

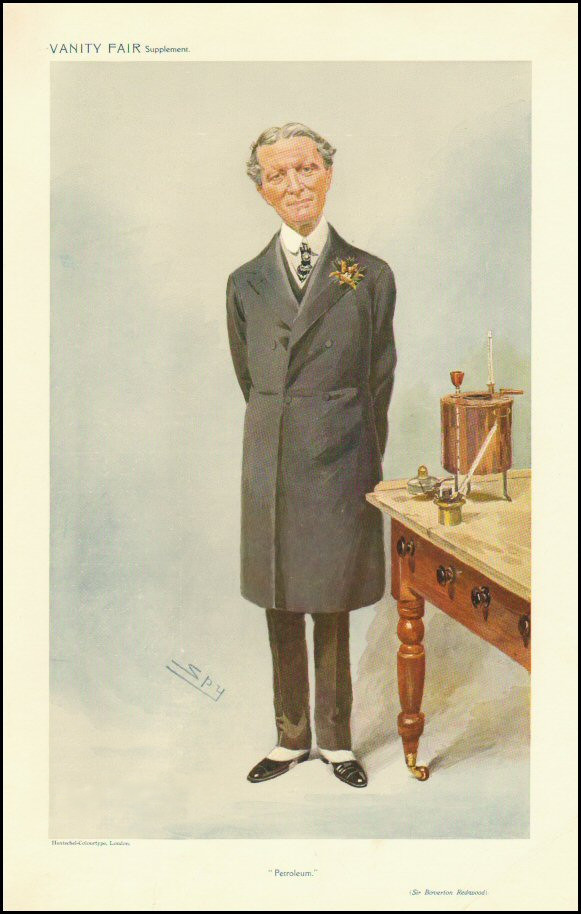
Sir Boverton Redwood caricatured by Spy in Vanity Fair (UK) in 1908

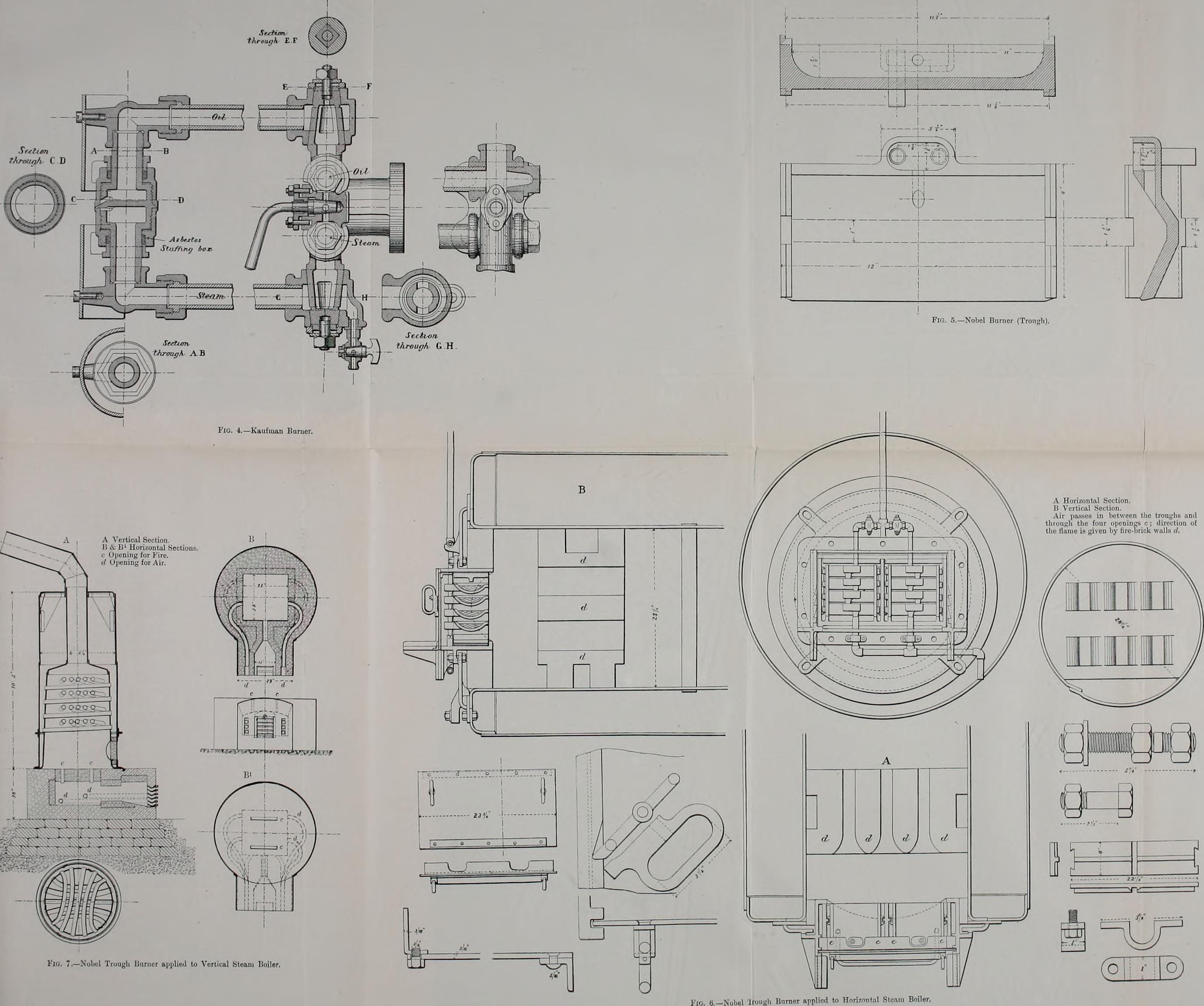
A diagram of petroleum equipment by Boverton Redwood

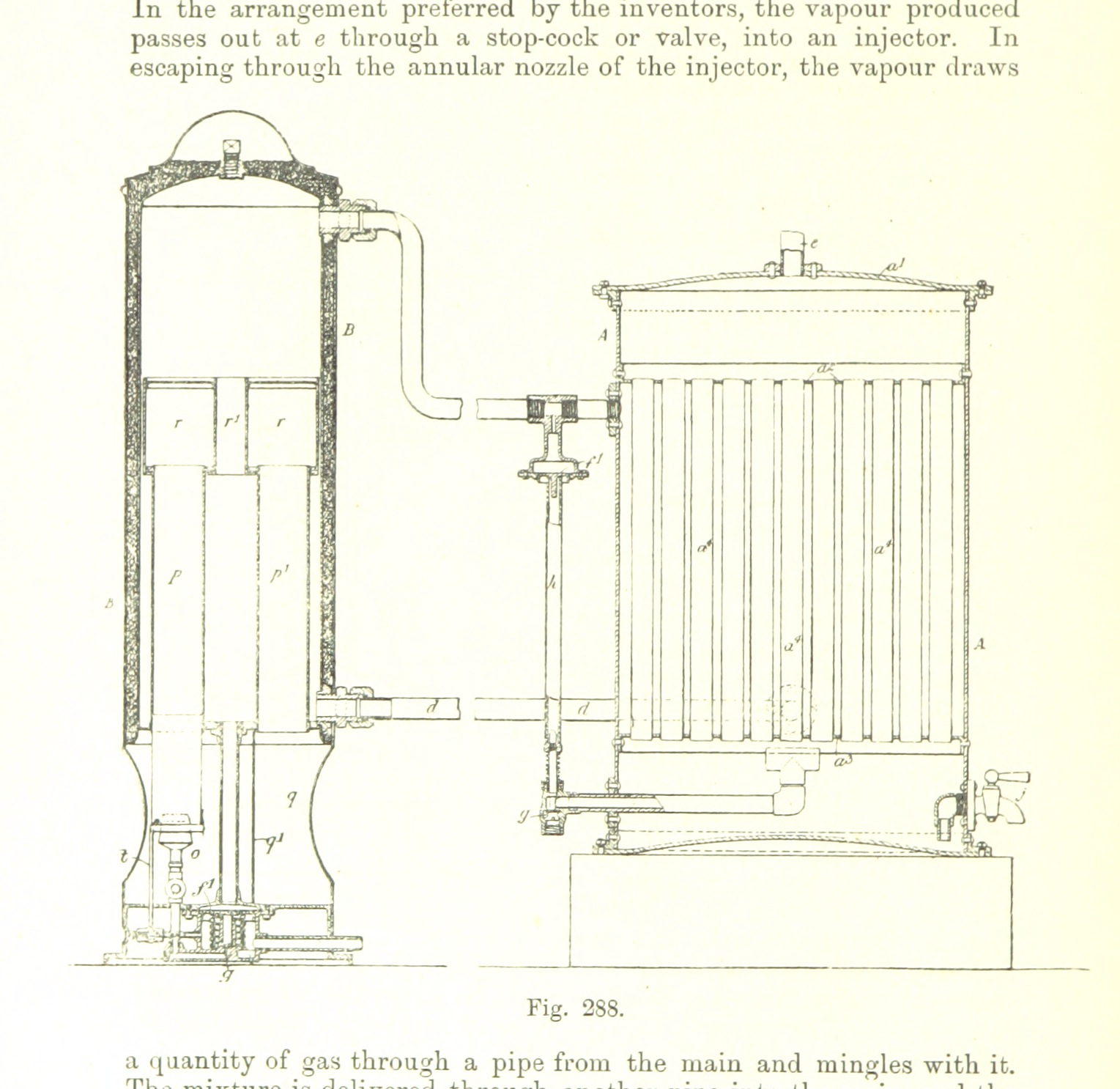
A diagram by Boverton Redwood

Sir Thomas Boverton Redwood FRSE FIC FCS FGS FRSA MIME (1846–1919) was a 19th-century British chemical engineer remembered as a pioneer of the petroleum industry. An early car-collector and enthusiast, he was also one of the first to investigate alcohol as a fuel.

He sat on (and often chaired) multiple government committees, including the British Science Guild, the Home Office Committee on Acetylene Generators. He was chairman of the Gas Traction Committee. He was vice president of the Society of Chemical Industries. He was president of the Institute of Petroleum Technologists 1914 to 1916. He was vice president of the Illuminating Engineering Society.

== Life ==
He was born in London on 26 April 1846, the eldest of eight children to Prof Theophilus Redwood (1806–1892), originally from Boverton in South Wales, and his wife, Charlotte Elizabeth Morson, daughter of Thomas Newborn Robert Morson who owned a London pharmaceutical firm. He studied chemistry at University College London gaining a doctorate (DSc with Honours).

In 1889 he was elected a Fellow of the Royal Society of Edinburgh. His proposers were Sir James Dewar, William Dittmar, Alexander Crum Brown and Robert Rattray Tatlock.

In 1895 he was co-founder of the Self-Propelled Traffic Association and in 1897 he was a co-founder of the Royal Automobile Club (RAC).

In 1912 he was appointed to the Royal Commission on Fuel and Engines. In the First World War he served on several committees ranging from petrol supplies, and oil supplies to the navy to the use of "liquid fire" (napalm) for trench warfare.

In later life he lived at 119 Piccadilly in central London. He was knighted by King Edward VII in 1905 and further was created Baronet of Marylebone Road by King George V in 1911.

He died in London following a short illness on 4 June 1919.

== Cars ==
His first car was a French Bolide then he acquired a Daimler in 1897. The Daimler was custom-built in Coventry to his own specification, being more powerful than average. He also had a De Dion-Bouton Voiturette.

In 1904 he was proud owner of a 7 hp Panhard and 16 hp De Dietrich-Bugatti and his hobby was listed as steam-yachting.

== Publications ==
- Cantor Lectures on Petroleum and its Products (1886)
- Petroleum: Its Production and Use (1887)
- Petroleum: a Treatise on its Geograohical Distribution (1896)
- A Treatise on Petroleum (2 vols) (1896)
- The Petroleum Technologist's Pocket Book (1915)

== Family ==
In 1873 he married Mary Elizabeth Letchford.

He was father to Bernard Boverton Redwood.

Coat of arms of Thomas Boverton Redwood
Crest A rock, thereon an eagle rising Proper charged on each wing with a mullet of six points in the beak a staff raguly Or. Escutcheon Paly of six Or and Ermine a lion rampant Sable on a chief Azure an embattled gateway Proper between two mullets of six points of the first. Motto Lumen Sevimus Antique

== See also ==
- Redwood baronets

Baronetage of the United Kingdom
New creation	Baronet (of Avenue Road); 1911–1919	Succeeded by Thomas Boverton Redwood
