= Royal Commission on Fuel and Engines =

The British Royal Commission on Fuel and Engines was established in the United Kingdom on 31 July 1912, and its remit was "[t]o report on the means of supply and storage of Liquid Fuel in peace and war, and its application to warship engines, whether indirectly or by internal combustion." Established by Winston Churchill, First Lord of the Admiralty from 1911 to 1915, its commissioners were John Fisher, George Lambert, Thomas Boverton Redwood, Philip Watts, Henry John Oram, John Jellicoe, William Matthews, Thomas Henry Holland, Thomas Edward Thorpe, Alexander Gracie, Humphrey Owen Jones and Alfred Yarrow. (Note: Lambert was also made a member of the Privy Council in 1912, prior to his appointment to the Commission. Boverton Redwood advised the government on petroleum; Watts advised the Navy on naval construction; Oram was a vice admiral and the Admiralty's engineer-in-chief; Jellicoe was a vice admiral; Matthews was a former president of the Institution of Civil Engineers; Holland was a geologist and former director of the Geological Survey of India; Thorpe was a former president of the Chemical Society; Gracie was a naval architect; Jones was a petrochemical scientist; Yarrow was a leading shipbuilder and engineer. Jones died on 15 August 1912, and George Thomas Beilby, another petrochemical scientist, was appointed as his replacement on 8 September 1912. R. F. H. Henderson, an admiral, was appointed to the commission on 18 February 1913, as Jellicoe had been made Second Sea Lord.)

== Oil integration ==
Fisher's "quest" as First Sea Lord from 1904 to early 1910 was to modernise the Navy, and, as an "oil maniac", this included changing to the use of fuel oil instead of coal for propulsion: the benefits and availability of the technology were proven, for example through "vitally important" tests involving HMS Spiteful in 1904, but the supply of oil was as yet unreliable. In 1903 Fisher had led an "Oil Fuel Committee" for the Admiralty, and as First Sea Lord he ordered more, smaller oil-burning warships for the Navy. As First Lord of the Admiralty, Churchill was convinced by Fisher's view of the Navy's needs, and became a "staunch proponent" of them. David Lloyd George, British prime minister from 1916 to 1922, regarded the Navy as Churchill's "obsession".

Churchill was concerned that Britain had inadequate storage and supplies of fuel oil for the Royal Navy. At the time of his appointment to the Admiralty, the Navy already had 189 oil-powered vessels built or under construction: these required "more than 200,000 tons of oil annually", while reserves of oil were only sufficient for 4 months. The principal issue was that, while Britain's internal supply of coal was plentiful, it had no such supply of oil, either domestically or within its empire. Further, a projection of the Navy's requirement for oil in 1912, produced by the Admiralty in December 1911 at Churchill's command, indicated that this would be "225 times" greater than the requirement 10 years previously. He appointed Fisher chairman of the Commission, and allowed him to choose its other members – all were "experts in petroleum, geology, engineering and shipbuilding." While standard warrants were published in The London Gazette, the Commission's reports, issued in November 1912, February 1913 and February 1914, were kept secret under the Official Secrets Act 1911.

=== Support ===
Some Navy officials showed outstanding support for the initiative. In 1914, Admiral John Jellicoe wrote to Fisher:

It [oil fuel] is also most a necessity for these vessels because of the great difficulty that they experience in our present battle cruisers of getting coal to the furnaces sufficiently rapidly to keep their full speed after they have reduced coal on board to from 50 to 60% of its full stowage.

Great strides were made in oil innovations, thanks to the admiralty's support.

=== Resistance ===
The first two reports recommended that storage be adequate for four years' supply. However, when signing them, Lambert, who was a Civil Lord of the Admiralty, added caveats that the quantity to be stored was estimated for peacetime, and that estimates for wartime were needed. Lambert also noted the importance of a continued coal supply, but the fact that none of the commissioners was an expert in coal "made its conclusions foregone." Among the most significant of these were that fuel oil was vital to the Navy; that it was best used in internal combustion engines; that the United Kingdom should keep large reserves of it; and that the Admiralty needed to become "a large-scale buyer". The Commission influenced the British government's decision in 1914 to buy a controlling, 51% stake in the Anglo-Persian Oil Company, of which BP is the successor.

== Result ==
Over the course of the three-year period, Fisher filed three reports on oil integration to Churchill, who used those reports to establish three leading guidelines in oil integration:

- Dispersing oil Supplies so as not to rely on a single source
- Promoting competition between oil companies
- Drawing oil supplies from areas in the British Empire

== Bibliography ==
- Anon. (1924), "The Late Sir George Beilby" (PDF), The Engineer, 138: 149
- Anon. (1930), "Obituary", Institute of Metals: Proceedings, 1: 383, archived from the original on 2018-12-19
- Anon. (1932), "Obituary" (PDF), The Engineer, 153: 133–135
- Black, E. (2004), Banking on Baghdad: Inside Iraq's 7,000-Year History of War, Profit, and Conflict, Wiley, ISBN 0-471-67186-X
- Brown, W.M. (2003). The Royal Navy's Fuel Supplies, 1898 – 1939: The Transition from Coal to Oil (PDF) (PhD thesis). King's College London. Archived (PDF) from the original on 2016-03-04.
- Dahl, Eric (2001). Naval Innovation: From Coal to Oil (PDF). Archived (PDF) from the original on 2019-04-08.
- Gilbert, M. (2015) [1976], Winston S. Churchill: The Prophet of Truth, 1922–1939 (Kindle ed.), Hillsdale College, ISBN 978-0-916308-23-0
- Hammond, P.W. (2008). "Thorpe, Sir Thomas Edward (1845–1925)". Oxford Dictionary of National Biography (online ed.). Oxford University Press. doi:10.1093/ref:odnb/36514. (Subscription, Wikipedia Library access or UK public library membership required.)
- Kuiken, J. (2014), "Caught in Transition: Britain's Oil Policy in the Face of Impending Crisis, 1967–1973", Historical Social Research, 39 (4): 272–290, JSTOR 24145537
- Lyon, D. (2005) [1996], The First Destroyers, Mercury, ISBN 1-84560-010-X
- MacLeod, R.M. (2004). "Holland, Sir Thomas Henry (1868–1947)". Oxford Dictionary of National Biography (online ed.). Oxford University Press. doi:10.1093/ref:odnb/33945. (Subscription, Wikipedia Library access or UK public library membership required.)
- Shorter, J. (1979), "Humphrey Owen Jones, F.R.S. (1878–1912), Chemist and Mountaineer", Notes and Records of the Royal Society of London, 33 (2): 261–277, doi:10.1098/rsnr.1979.0014, JSTOR 531669, S2CID 57870696
- Siegel, J. (2002), Endgame: Britain, Russia, and the Final Struggle for Central Asia, I.B. Tauris, ISBN 1-85043-371-2
- Toprani, Anand (2019). Oil and the Great Powers: Britain and Germany, 1914 to 1945. Oxford University Press. ISBN 978-0-19-883460-1.
- Vassiliou, M.S. (2018), Historical Dictionary of the Petroleum Industry (2 ed.), Rowman & Littlefield, ISBN 9781538111604
- Watson, G. (1988), The Civils: The Story of the Institution of Civil Engineers, Thomas Telford, ISBN 9780727703927
- Winegard, T.C. (2016), The First World Oil War, University of Toronto, ISBN 978-1-4875-0073-3
