= Redwood baronets =

Baronetcy in the Baronetage of the United Kingdom

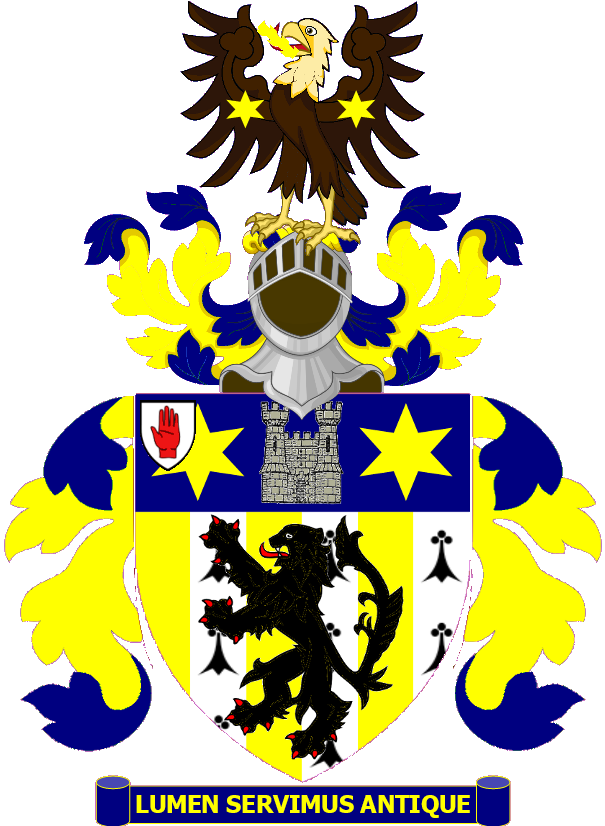
- Coat of arms of the Redwood baronets of Avenue Road
- Creation date: 1911
- Status: extant
- Motto: Lumen Sevimus Antique, we sowed the old light
- Crest: A rock, thereon an eagle rising Proper charged on each wing with a mullet of six points in the beak a staff raguly Or.

The Redwood Baronetcy, of Avenue Road in St Marylebone, London, is a title in the Baronetage of the United Kingdom. It was created on 24 July 1911 for Boverton Redwood. He was a leading expert on petroleum and an adviser to the Admiralty, India Office and Home Office. He was Director of Technical Investigation at the Petroleum Executive from 1917 to his death in 1919.

The 3rd Baronet, a Colonel in the King's Own Scottish Borderers, retired in 1987.

== Redwood baronets, of Avenue Road (1911) ==
- Sir Thomas Boverton Redwood, 1st Baronet (1846–1919)
  - Bernard Boverton Redwood (1874–1911), son of the 1st Baronet
- Sir Thomas Boverton Redwood, 2nd Baronet (1906–1974)
- Sir Peter Boverton Redwood, 3rd Baronet (born 1937)

The heir presumptive is the present holder's half-brother Robert Boverton Redwood (born 1953). The heir presumptive's heir apparent is his son James Boverton Redwood (born 1985).

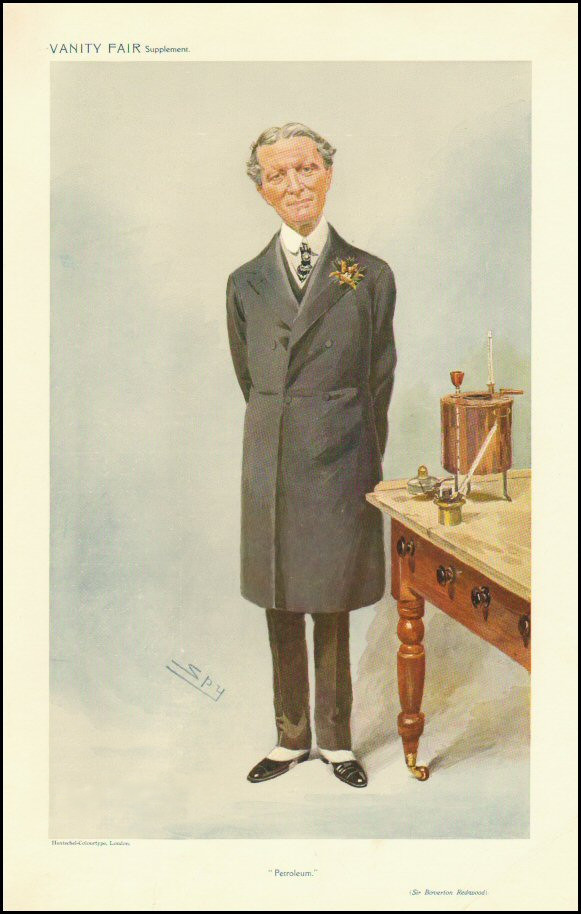
"Petroleum", Sir Boverton Redwood (1st Baronet) caricatured by Spy in Vanity Fair (UK) in 1908

== Notes ==
Baronetage of the United Kingdom
Preceded by Lambart baronets	Redwood baronets of Avenue Road; 24 July 1911	Succeeded by Assheton-Smith baronets
