= Water motorsports at the 1900 Summer Olympics =

Water motorsport was on the Summer Olympic Games programme in 1900. These events have generally not been classified as official, although the IOC has never decided which events were "Olympic" and which were not. As with the official croquet events, some motorboating events satisfied three of four retrospective criteria — restriction to amateurs, open to all nations, open to all competitors and without handicapping. As with croquet, there were only French players. (All other official events met all four criteria.) Motorboating was also included in the 1908 Olympic Games.

== Results ==
Eight events, now regarded as unofficial, were held during the 1900 Olympics. First three pilots (with engine manufacturers in parentheses, where known) in those events were:

6.5m (12km): George Pitre (Outhenin-Chalandre) FRA 47:15, Jules Valton FRA 53:34, ??? (Dalifol) FRA 53:59

6.5m (50km): George Pitre (Outhenin-Chalandre) FRA 3:40:19, Jules Valton FRA 3:53:02, ?. Dumas Jr. FRA 4:19:08

6.5-8m (12km): ??? (Panhard-Levassor) FRA 54:17, ?. Deslignières FRA 59:15 (only 2 finishers)

6.5-8m (50km): ?. Guibert FRA 4:21:02, ?. Deslignières FRA 4:25:00, ?. Michaelsen FRA 4:26:03

8-10m (20km): ?. Oudin FRA 1:30:39, G. Gallice FRA 1:31:59, ?. Marnix FRA 1:32:20

8-10m (60km): Auguste Dussaux FRA 4:40:45, ?. Marnix FRA 4:41:14, G. Gallice FRA 4:43:40

10-15m (24km): Xavier Schelcher FRA 1:09:27, ?. Schindler FRA 1:27:25, ?. Deprez FRA 1:27:52

10-15m (72km): Xavier Schelcher FRA 3:49:00, ?. Schindler FRA 4:23:20, ?. Deprez FRA 4:33:00

== See also ==
- 1900 Summer Olympics
- Boat racing
- Motorboat
