= Water motorsports at the 1908 Summer Olympics =

Water motorsports at the Games of the IV Olympiad
- Venues: Southampton Water
- Dates: August 28–29
- Competitors: 17 from 2 nations

At the 1908 Summer Olympics, three motorboat racing events were contested. Various sources refer to the sport as "water motorsports", "motor boats", and "power boating". The 1900 and 1908 Summer Games were the only ones to feature motorised sports (motor racing was featured in 1900). The IOC has never decided which events were "Olympic" and which were not.

All three events used the same distance: five laps around an 8-nautical-mile course for a total of 40 nautical miles (74 km). In each of the events, multiple boats started; however, only one finished due primarily to the gale that was blowing during the course of the competition. Events were held on 28 August and 29 August 1908.

== Medal summary ==
Games	Gold	Silver	Bronze
Class A — Open	Emile Thubron (FRA); Camille	none	none
Class B — Under 60 feet	Great Britain; John Field-Richards; Bernard Boverton Redwood; Isaac Thomas Thornycroft Gyrinus	none	none
Class C — 6.5–8 metres	Great Britain; John Field-Richards; Bernard Boverton Redwood; Isaac Thomas Thornycroft Gyrinus	none	none

The water motorsports event was quickly abolished, because after these games the IOC decided that the Olympics was not intended for motorized competition.

== Participating nations ==
17 boaters from 2 nations competed.

- France (4)
- Great Britain (13)

== Medal table ==
Rank	Nation	Gold	Silver	Bronze	Total
1	Great Britain	2	0	0	2
2	France	1	0	0	1
Totals (2 entries)		3	0	0	3

== Events ==
=== Class A — Open class ===
The open class was scheduled to take place on the first day of competition, 28 August. Two boats, Wolseley-Siddely and Dylan, began the race. Dylan abandoned the race partway through the first lap, with Wolseley-Siddely finishing first before the weather became too severe to continue the race.

A second attempt to run the event took place the next day after the other two races had been completed. Wolseley-Siddely again started, this time against Camille (the only French boat to take part in competition). Wolseley-Siddely ran aground on a mud spit, leaving Camille to finish alone for the gold medal.

=== Class B — Under 60 feet ===
The B class was held on 28 August after the abortive first running of the open class. Again, only two boats appeared at the starting line: Quicksilver and Gyrinus. Quicksilver became threatened by water coming in over the sides, abandoning the race. Gyrinus, a small boat with an extra crewman to bail water, was able to finish to make its crew the first Olympic champions in motorsports. Gyrinus was the earliest round-bilge Semi-Planing Mono-Hull ('SPMH') designed by Sir John Isaac Thornycroft FRS, the great Victorian engineer, previously the designer and builder of the world's first torpedo boats and torpedo boat 'Destroyers'. Development of the technical features of Gyrinus (combining speed with good seaworthiness, as demonstrated in the 1908 Olympics) was described in 'Engineering', the Proceedings of the Society of Civil Engineers, on March 12, 1909. His son, Isaac Thomas Thornycroft, the Gyrinus helmsman, became a yacht designer and helmsman of J-Class racing yachts. Thomas's son, Commander Peter Thornycroft (1914–1987), carried on the family tradition, developing the SPMH as the standard Nelson Class of Pilot Boat for Trinity House (1964 to 1987) and, later, up to much larger sizes of offshore patrol vessels. The US Navy's 350 ft./114-metre/3,200-ton/45-knot USS Freedom is the largest SPMH launched to date (2006). It combines a higher speed-for-length than would be possible with a conventional destroyer hull, good seakeeping at speed, and a high payload—characteristics that enabled the little Gyrinus to win her famous Olympic victories.

=== Class C — 6.5–8 metres ===
The first race of 29 August was the small class of boats. Gyrinus, which had won the B class the day before, appeared again. This time her competition was Sea Dog. Again, however, Gyrinus was the only boat to finish, as Sea Dog experienced engine problems and had to be towed off the course.

== Crew lists ==
=== France ===
==== Camille ====
- Emile Thubron

=== Great Britain ===
==== Dylan ====
- Thomas Scott-Ellis
- A. G. Fentiman

==== Gyrinus ====
- Isaac Thomas Thornycroft
- Bernard Boverton Redwood
- John Field-Richards

==== Quicksilver ====
- John Marshall Gorham
- Sophia Hope Gorham

==== Sea Dog ====
- Warwick Wright
- Thomas Weston

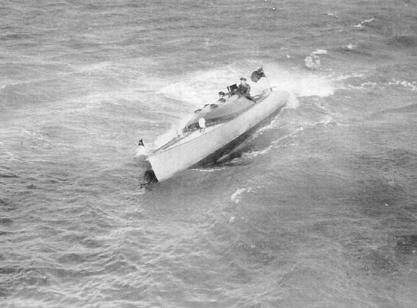
Wolseley-Siddely in heavy weather

==== Wolseley-Siddely ====
- Hugh Grosvenor
- George Clowes
- Joseph Frederick Laycock (first race only)
- G. H. Atkinson (second race only)

== See also ==
- List of Olympic venues in discontinued events

== Sources ==
- Cook, Theodore Andrea (1908). The Fourth Olympiad, Being the Official Report. London: British Olympic Association.
- De Wael, Herman (2001). "Motorboating 1908". Herman's Full Olympians. Archived from the original on 3 March 2016.
