= Duff baronets of Vaynol Park (1911) =

Extinct baronetcy

Duff baronets
- Escutcheon of the Duff baronets of Vaynol Park
- Creation date: 1911
- Status: extinct
- Extinction date: 1980
- Motto: Virtute et opera, By virtue and deeds
- Arms: Quarterly, 1st and 4th, counter quartered (1st) and (4th) az. 2 bars between three pheons, or (Smith); (2nd) and (3rd) arg. a mullet pierced sa. (Assheton); 2nd and 3rd vert, a fesse dancetty erm., between a stag's head cabossed in chief and two escallops in base or, within a bordure chequy of the last and first (Duff).
- Crest: 1. Issuant from a mural crown, or, 2 arms embowed vested az. cuffed arg. the hands ppr. holding a pheon (Smith); 2. a mower in the act of mowing vested per pale arg. and sa., scythe-handle or, blade, ppr. (Assheton); 3. a bucks head erased ppr. (Duff)

The Assheton-Smith, later Duff baronetcy, of Vaynol Park in the County of Carnarfon, was created in the Baronetage of the United Kingdom on 1 August 1911 for the local politician Charles Garden Assheton-Smith, High Sheriff of Carnarvonshire in 1908, who had changed his surname from Duff in 1905. The title became extinct on the death of the 3rd Baronet in 1980.

== Assheton-Smith, later Duff baronets, of Vaynol Park (1911) ==
- Sir Charles Garden Assheton-Smith, 1st Baronet (1851–1914)
- Sir Robert George Vivian Duff, 2nd Baronet (1876–1914)
- Sir (Charles) Michael Robert Vivian Duff, 3rd Baronet (1907–1980)

== Notes ==
Baronetage of the United Kingdom
| Preceded by Redwood baronets | Assheton-Smith baronets of Vaynol Park; 1 August 1911 | Succeeded by David baronets |
