= Isaac Thomas Thornycroft =

British motorboat racer

Personal information
- Nationality: English
- Born: 22 November 1881 England
- Died: 6 June 1955 (aged 73)
- Relative: John Isaac Thornycroft (father)

Sport
- Sport: Motorboat racing
- Events: Motorboat A, Motorboat B
Medal record
Men's Water motorsports
Representing United Kingdom
Gold medal – first place	1908 London	Class B
Gold medal – first place	1908 London	Class C

Isaac Thomas Thornycroft (22 November 1881 – 6 June 1955) was an English motorboat racer who competed in the 1908 Summer Olympics representing Great Britain.

He won seven gold medals in the only motor boat competitions included in the Olympics as helmsman of the Gyrinus II, which was designed by his father, Sir John Isaac Thornycroft, after the only other entry in both events failed to complete the course.

He became a yacht designer and helmsman of J Class racing yachts.
