= Sophia Hope Gorham =

British motorboat racer

Personal information
- Birth name: Sophia Hope Hallowes
- Born: 10 November 1881; Merchiston, Edinburgh
- Died: 4 December 1969 (aged 88); Chichester, West Sussex
- Spouse(s): John Marshall Gorham (m. 1906; died 1929) Cuthred Compton (m. 1932)

Sport
- Country: Great Britain
- Sport: Motorboat racing
- Event: Mixed B Class (under 60 ft)

Sophia Hope Gorham (1881–1969) was a British motorboat racer who competed in the 1908 Summer Olympics. She is the only woman in Olympic history to compete in a motorboat event.

== Early life ==
Sophia Hope Hallowes was born on 10 November 1881, the daughter of George Skene Hallowes, a Major general in the British Army. By 1891, she was living in Kensington with her parents, six siblings, and four domestic servants.

In 1906, at the age of 25, she married the 53-year-old John Marshall Gorham, an electrical engineer.

== 1908 Summer Olympics ==
Motorboat racing was featured as an official Olympic sport for the first and only time at the 1908 Summer Olympics. The sport was not specifically open to women, however they were also not explicitly prohibited.

Sophia and her husband John competed in the Mixed B Class event, which only had two entrants: their boat Quicksilver, and Gyrinus. There was rough weather that day and Quicksilver was forced to abandon the race after one lap, while Gyrinus was able to finish the five-lap race and claimed the gold medal.

After the race, The Times drew attention to Gorham as "an example of feminine endurance," however, she was identified in the Olympic record books solely as "Mrs Gorham," and her full name wasn't revealed until research was completed years later.

== Later life ==
By 1911, Gorham and her husband John were living in Singleton, West Sussex. John later died in 1929, and three years later she remarried, to Reverend Cuthred Compton, the Vicar of Hawkhurst, Kent. On 4 December 1969, Sophia died in Chichester, West Sussex.
