= John Field-Richards =

British motorboat racer

Olympic medal record

Men's Water motorsports
Gold medal – first place	1908 London	Class B
Gold medal – first place	1908 London	Class C

John Charles Field-Richards (10 May 1878 – 18 April 1959) was a British Army officer and motorboat racer who competed in the 1908 Summer Olympics.

== Biography ==
Field-Richards studied at Keble College, Oxford. He joined the Hampshire Regiment as Second lieutenant on 19 May 1900, and was promoted to Lieutenant on 10 January 1902.

As a crew member of the Gyrinus he won two gold medals in the only motorboat competition at the Olympics.
