= John Marshall Gorham =

British motorboat racer

John Marshall Gorham (25 November 1853 – 12 January 1929) was a British motorboat racer who competed in the 1908 Summer Olympics.

== Career ==
He was educated at Tonbridge School, and served an apprenticeship of four years (1870–1874) to Messrs. Robey & Co. Engineers, Lincoln passing through the shops and drawing office; then for six years was Engineering Assistant to the same firm engaged on installations of Mining Machinery principally in England, Spain and France; for one year (1881) represented Messrs. Robey at the Paris Electrical Exhibition; and for two years (1882–1883) on electrical installations at the Palaces of the King of Roumania. Between 1884 and 1886 acted as Works Manager to the Electrical Power Storage Company; and since 1886 has been in partnership with Mr B. Drake under the style of Drake and Gorham. The firm have a turnover of £150,000 and are principally engaged as Electrical Engineers in connection with the lighting of country houses, Offices and Public buildings such as Chatsworth, Wynard Park, Crewe Hall, the Prudential Insurance Co.'s offices, Scotland Yard Government contract £9000 etc.

== Family ==
He was the son of Dr John Gorham (1814–1899), a general practitioner of Tonbridge, Kent, and his second wife Elizabeth née Harris (1829–1916). In 1906 he married Sophia Hope Hallowes, a daughter of Major-General George Skene Hallowes (1831–1940) and Lucy Ann, née Hope (1846–1931); her sister, Elizabeth Boyle Hallowes, married David Carnegie, 10th Earl of Northesk.

== Sources ==
- CIBSE Heritage Group: Biographies of Bernard Drake and his son
- Grace's Guide: Drake_and_Gorham outline history
