= Bernard Boverton Redwood =

British motorboat racer

Olympic medal record

Men's Water motorsports
Gold medal – first place	1908 London	Class B
Gold medal – first place	1908 London	Class C

Bernard Boverton Redwood (28 November 1874 – 28 September 1911) was a British motorboat racer who competed in the 1908 Summer Olympics.

As a crew member of the Gyrinus, he won two gold medals in the only motor boat competition at the Olympics. His father was Sir Thomas Boverton Redwood, 1st Baronet.

Coat of arms of Bernard Boverton Redwood
Crest A rock, thereon an eagle rising Proper charged on each wing with a mullet of six points in the beak a staff raguly Or. Escutcheon Paly of six Or and Ermine a lion rampant Sable on a chief Azure an embattled gateway Proper between two mullets of six points of the first. Motto Lumen Sevimus Antique
