= Rowing at the 1920 Summer Olympics =

Rowing at the Games of the VII Olympiad
- Dates: 27–29 August 1920
- Competitors: 136 from 14 nations

Rowing at the 1920 Summer Olympics, the first Olympics after World War I, saw five events. The competitions were held from 27 to 29 August in Antwerp, Belgium.

The event was marked by the arrival of future triple gold medalists John B. Kelly Sr., Jack Beresford and Paul Costello. Kelly and Beresford would stage a dramatic dual for the singles title, with Kelly prevailing. Immediately after his victory, Kelly would step into the double with his cousin Paul Costello, and easily win the gold in that event. Beresford, though he didn't win gold in these Olympics, would medal at five straight Olympics.

In the eight, the United States was represented by the United States Naval Academy. The United States would be represented by university crews at the next seven games in the men's eight, winning each time.

== Medal summary ==
Event	Gold	Silver	Bronze
Single Sculls	Jack Kelly Sr. United States	Jack Beresford; Great Britain	Darcy Hadfield; New Zealand
Double Sculls	Paul Costello and Jack Kelly Sr. United States	Pietro Annoni and Erminio Dones; Italy	Gaston Giran and Alfred Plé; France
Coxed Pairs	Italy; Ercole Olgeni; Giovanni Scatturin; Guido De Felip	France; Gabriel Poix; Maurice Monney-Bouton; Ernest Barberolle	Switzerland; Édouard Candeveau; Alfred Felber; Paul Piaget
Coxed four	Switzerland; Willy Brüderlin; Max Rudolf; Paul Rudolf; Hans Walter; Paul Staub	United States; Ken Myers; Carl Klose; Franz Federschmidt; Erich Federschmidt; Sherm Clark	Norway; Birger Var; Theodor Klem; Henry Larsen; Per Gulbrandsen; Thoralf Hagen
Eights	United States; Virgil Jacomini; Edwin Graves; William Jordan; Edward Moore; Alden Sanborn; Donald Johnston; Vince Gallagher; Clyde King; Sherm Clark	Great Britain; Ewart Horsfall; Guy Oliver Nickalls; Richard Lucas; Walter James; John Campbell; Sebastian Earl; Ralph Shove; Sidney Swann; Robin Johnstone	Norway; Theodor Nag; Conrad Olsen; Adolf Nilsen; Håkon Ellingsen; Thore Michelsen; Arne Mortensen; Karl Nag; Tollef Tollefsen; Thoralf Hagen

== Participating nations ==
A total of 136 rowers from 14 nations competed at the Antwerp Games:

- Belgium (20)
- Brazil (5)
- Canada (5)
- Czechoslovakia (15)
- Denmark (1)
- France (14)
- Great Britain (10)
- Italy (6)
- Netherlands (12)
- New Zealand (1)
- Norway (13)
- Sweden (6)
- Switzerland (13)
- United States (15)

== Medal table ==
Kelly v. Beresford, 1920 Olympics

Rank	Nation	Gold	Silver	Bronze	Total
1	United States	3	1	0	4
2	Italy	1	1	0	2
3	Switzerland	1	0	1	2
4	Great Britain	0	2	0	2
5	France	0	1	1	2
6	Norway	0	0	2	2
7	New Zealand	0	0	1	1
Totals (7 entries)		5	5	5	15

== Sources ==
- Belgium Olympic Committee (1957). Olympic Games Antwerp 1920: Official Report (PDF) (in French). Archived from the original (PDF) on 7 October 2018.
- International Olympic Committee medal database
