= Netherlands at the 1920 Summer Olympics =

- Flag of the Netherlands
- IOC code: NED
- NOC: Dutch Olympic Committee

in Antwerp
- Competitors: 130 in 15 sports
- Medals Ranked 9th: Gold 4 Silver 2 Bronze 5 Total 11

Summer Olympics appearances (overview)
- 1900; 1904; 1908; 1912; 1920; 1924; 1928; 1932; 1936; 1948; 1952; 1956; 1960; 1964; 1968; 1972; 1976; 1980; 1984; 1988; 1992; 1996; 2000; 2004; 2008; 2012; 2016; 2020; 2024

Other related appearances
- 1906 Intercalated Games

The Netherlands competed at the 1920 Summer Olympics in Antwerp, Belgium. 130 competitors, 129 men and 1 woman, took part in 58 events in 15 sports.

== Medalists ==
=== Gold ===
- Piet de Brouwer, Joep Packbiers, Janus Theeuwes, Driekske van Bussel, Jo van Gastel, Tiest van Gestel, Janus van Merrienboer, and Theo Willems — Archery, Men's Team Competition
- Maurice Peeters — Cycling, Men's 1.000m Sprint (Scratch)
- Cornelis Hin, Frans Hin, and Johan Hin — Sailing, Men's Dinghy
- Berend Carp, Joop Carp, and Petrus Wernink — Sailing, Men's 6½ Meter Class

=== Silver ===
- Wilhelmus Bekkers, Johannes Hengeveld, Sytse Jansma, Henk Janssen, Antonius van Loon, Willem van Loon, Marinus van Rekum, and Willem van Rekum — Tug of War, Men's Team Competition
- Petrus Beukers and Arnoud van der Biesen — Sailing, Men's Dinghy

=== Bronze ===
- Piet Ikelaar — Cycling, Men's 50 km Track Race
- Frans de Vreng and Piet Ikelaar — Cycling, Men's 2.000m Tandem
- Arie de Jong — Fencing, Men's Sabre Individual
- Arie de Jong, Louis Delaunoij, Jetze Doorman, Willem van Blijenburgh, Jan van der Wiel, Henri Wijnoldij-Daniëls, and Salomon Zeldenrust — Fencing, Men's Sabre Team
- Arie Bieshaar, Leo Bosschart, Evert Jan Bulder, Jaap Bulder, Jan de Natris, Harry Dénis, Ber Groosjohan, Frits Kuipers, Dick MacNeill, Henk Steeman, Jan van Dort, Oscar van Rappard, Ben Verweij, and Felix von Heijden — Football (soccer), Men's Team Competition

== Aquatics ==
=== Swimming ===
Four swimmers, including one woman, represented the Netherlands in 1920. It was the nation's debut in the sport. None of the swimmers advanced to an event final. Rie Beisenherz became the first woman to represent the Netherlands at the Olympics.

Ranks given are within the heat.

Men

Swimmer	Event	Quarterfinals		Semifinals		Final	
Swimmer	Event	Result	Rank	Result	Rank	Result	Rank
Ko Korsten	100 m free	1:05.6	2 Q	Unknown	7	Did not advance	
Jean van Silfhout	100 m free	1:09.0	3	Did not advance			
Cor Zegger	1500 m free	24:58.0	3	Did not advance			

Women

Swimmer	Event	Semifinals		Final	
Swimmer	Event	Result	Rank	Result	Rank
Rie Beisenherz	100 m free	1:22.6	3	Did not advance	

=== Water polo ===
The Netherlands competed in the Olympic water polo tournament for the second time in 1920. A modified version of the Bergvall System was in use at the time. The Netherlands lost 2–1 to Belgium in the quarterfinals. Because Belgium eventually finished with the silver medal, the Dutch had a chance to play for the bronze. In the bronze medal quarterfinals, they defeated Czechoslovakia. They fell to Sweden in the bronze semifinals, however.

- Squad

- Karel Struijs
- Karel Kratz
- Karel Meijer
- Johan Cortlever
- Piet Plantinga

- Gé Bohlander
- Jean van Silfhout
- Piet van der Velden
- Leen Hoogendijk

Quarterfinals

Belgium	2–1	Netherlands	Antwerp

Bronze medal quarterfinals

Netherlands	7–0	Czechoslovakia	Antwerp

Bronze medal semifinals

Sweden	9–1	Netherlands	Antwerp

Final rank
5th

== Archery ==
The Netherlands sent eight archers in its second Olympic archery appearance. The Dutch archers competed in a single event, the team moving bird at 28 metres. Facing off against a Belgian team and a French team, the Netherlands squad took the gold medal.

Archer	Event	Final	
Archer	Event	Score	Rank
Piet de Brouwer; Joep Packbiers; Janus Theeuwes; Driekske van Bussel; Jo van Gastel; Tiest van Gestel; Janus van Merrienboer; Theo Willems	Team moving bird, 28 m	3087	1st place, gold medalist(s)

== Athletics ==
11 athletes represented the Netherlands in 1920. It was the nation's third appearance in athletics. Paulen's seventh-place finish in the 800 metres was the country's best result in the sport to date.

Ranks given are within the heat.

Athlete	Event	Heats		Quarterfinals		Semifinals		Final	
Athlete	Event	Result	Rank	Result	Rank	Result	Rank	Result	Rank
Jan de Vries	100 m		4	Did not advance					
Cor Gubbels	3 km walk	—N/a				Disqualified		Did not advance	
Albert Heijnneman	100 m	11.0	3	Did not advance					
Albert Heijnneman	200 m	25.4	2 Q	Disqualified		Did not advance			
Christiaan Huijgens	Marathon	—N/a						Did not finish	
Adje Paulen	800 m	—N/a		1:58.4	4 Q	1:57.8	3 Q	1:56.3	7
August Schotte	3 km walk	—N/a					7	Did not advance	
Gerardus van der Wel	5000 m	—N/a					9	Did not advance	
Harry van Rappard	100 m		4	Did not advance					
Harry van Rappard	200 m	23.7	4	Did not advance					
Oscar van Rappard	110 m hurdles	—N/a			3	Did not advance			
Hendricus Wessel	Marathon	—N/a						3:00:17.0	26
Cor Wezepoel	100 m	11.5	2 Q		5	Did not advance			
Cor Wezepoel	200 m	23.3	2 Q	23.3	5	Did not advance			
Jan de Vries; Albert Heijnneman; Harry van Rappard; Cor Wezepoel	4 × 100 m relay	—N/a				43.5	3	Did not advance	

== Boxing ==
Eight boxers represented Netherlands at the 1920 Games. It was the nation's debut in boxing. None of the boxers made it past the quarterfinals.

Boxer	Weight class	Round of 32	Round of 16	Quarterfinals	Semifinals	Final / Bronze match	
Boxer	Weight class	Opposition Score	Opposition Score	Opposition Score	Opposition Score	Opposition Score	Rank
Jan Hesterman	Middleweight	Bye	Bradley (RSA); L	Did not advance			9
Wim Hesterman	Featherweight	Rankin (CAN); W	Bouvy (BEL); L	Did not advance			9
Johannes Heuckelbach	Welterweight	Schannong (DEN); L	Did not advance				17
Ko Janssens	Lightweight	N/A	Cassidy (USA); L	Did not advance			9
Paul Munting	Middleweight	Bye	Herscovitch (CAN); L	Did not advance			9
Herman Nak	Lightweight	N/A	Grace (GBR); L	Did not advance			9
Nelis van Dijk	Flyweight	N/A	Pedersen (DEN); L	Did not advance			9
Ted Zegwaard	Flyweight	N/A	Virtue (GBR); W	Cuthbertson (GBR); L	Did not advance		5

Opponent nation	Wins	Losses	Percent
Belgium	0	1	.000
Canada	1	1	.500
Denmark	0	2	.000
Great Britain	1	2	.333
South Africa	0	1	.000
United States	0	1	.000
Total	2	8	.200

Round	Wins	Losses	Percent
Round of 32	1	1	.500
Round of 16	1	6	.143
Quarterfinals	0	1	.000
Semifinals	0	0	–
Final	0	0	–
Bronze match	0	0	–
Total	2	8	.200

== Cycling ==
Ten cyclists represented the Netherlands in 1920. It was the nation's second appearance in the sport. Peeters won the sprint event. Ikelaar took the bronze in the 50 kilometres, and added another bronze along with de Vreng in the tandem. The three medals were the first Olympic cycling medals for the Netherlands, and put the country in third place in the cycling leaderboard for the Games.

=== Road cycling ===
Cyclist	Event	Final	
Cyclist	Event	Result	Rank
Nicolaas de Jong	Time trial	5:06:46.6	25
Petrus Ikelaar	Time trial	4:46:54.0	8
Pieter Kloppenburg	Time trial	5:22:16.0	33
Arie van der Stel	Time trial	5:12:42.6	27
Nicolaas de Jong; Petrus Ikelaar; Pieter Kloppenburg; Arie van der Stel	Team time trial	20:28:39.2	6

=== Track cycling ===
Ranks given are within the heat.

Cyclist	Event	Heats		Quarterfinals		Repechage semis		Repechage final		Semifinals		Final	
Cyclist	Event	Result	Rank	Result	Rank	Result	Rank	Result	Rank	Result	Rank	Result	Rank
Tjabel Boonstra	Sprint	Unknown	3	Did not advance									
Franciscus de Vreng	Sprint	Unknown	3	Did not advance									
Petrus Ikelaar	Sprint	Unknown	2 Q	Unknown	3 R	Unknown	4	Did not advance					
Petrus Ikelaar	50 km	N/A										Unknown	3rd place, bronze medalist(s)
Anton Krijgsman	50 km	N/A										Did not finish	
Willem Ooms	50 km	N/A										Did not finish	
Maurice Peeters	Sprint	Unknown	2 Q	13.2	1 Q	Advanced directly				12.6	1 Q	13.0	1st place, gold medalist(s)
Arie van der Stel	50 km	N/A										Did not finish	
Pieter Beets; Tjabel Boonstra	Tandem	N/A		Unknown	3	N/A				Did not advance			
Franciscus de Vreng; Petrus Ikelaar	Tandem	N/A		12.6	1 Q	N/A				Unknown	2 B	Unknown	3rd place, bronze medalist(s)
Pieter Beets; Franciscus de Vreng; Petrus Ikelaar; Maurice Peeters	Team pursuit	N/A		Unknown	2	N/A				Did not advance			

== Equestrian ==
A single equestrian represented the Netherlands in 1920. It was the nation's debut in the sport. Sirtema competed in the individual eventing competition, finishing in 20th place.

Equestrian	Horse	Event	Final	
Equestrian	Horse	Event	Result	Rank
Idzard Sirtema	Good Shot	Eventing	1035.00	20

== Fencing ==
Ten fencers represented the Netherlands in 1920. It was the nation's fourth appearance in the sport. The country's best results were in the sabre competitions. De Jong won the bronze medal in the individual event and two others reached the final; it was the only individual event in which the team had any finalists. The sabre team also captured a bronze medal.

Ranks given are within the group.

Fencer	Event	First round		Quarterfinals		Semifinals		Final	
Fencer	Event	Result	Rank	Result	Rank	Result	Rank	Result	Rank
Wouter Brouwer	Épée	3–3	5 Q	3–7	8	Did not advance			
Wouter Brouwer	Foil	N/A		2–4	4	Did not advance			
Wouter Brouwer	Sabre	N/A		3–4	5	Did not advance			
Adrianus de Jong	Épée	6–2	2 Q	6–4	4 Q	4–7	8	Did not advance	
Adrianus de Jong	Foil	N/A		4–4	4	Did not advance			
Adrianus de Jong	Sabre	N/A		5–2	3 Q	5–1	2 Q	6–5	3rd place, bronze medalist(s)
Louis Delaunoij	Épée	3–6	7	Did not advance					
Willem Hubert	Épée	3–6	7	Did not advance					
Jan van der Wiel	Épée	5–2	1 Q	1–10	12	Did not advance			
Jan van der Wiel	Foil	N/A		1–6	7	Did not advance			
Jan van der Wiel	Sabre	N/A		6–2	1 Q	3–3	3 Q	6–5	5
Félix Vigeveno	Épée	2–6	8	Did not advance					
Félix Vigeveno	Foil	N/A		3–2	3 Q	2–3	4	Did not advance	
Félix Vigeveno	Sabre	N/A		2–5	7	Did not advance			
Henri Wijnoldij-Daniëls	Épée	4–3	3 Q	4–6	7	Did not advance			
Henri Wijnoldij-Daniëls	Sabre	N/A		4–3	4 Q	4–2	1 Q	4–7	9
Salomon Zeldenrust	Épée	3–5	7	Did not advance					
Salomon Zeldenrust	Foil	N/A		5–3	4	Did not advance			
Wouter Brouwer; Adrianus de Jong; Jan van der Wiel; Félix Vigeveno; Salomon Zeldenrust	Team foil	N/A				0–2	3	Did not advance	
Adrianus de Jong; Louis Delaunoy; Jetze Doorman; Willem Hubert; Jan van der Wiel; Salomon Zeldenrust	Team sabre	N/A						5–2	3rd place, bronze medalist(s)
Adrianus de Jong; Jetze Doorman; Willem Hubert; George van Rossem; Henri Wijnoldy-Daniëls; Salomon Zeldenrust	Team épée	N/A				2–2	4	Did not advance	

== Football ==
The Netherlands competed in the Olympic football tournament for the third time, winning its third straight bronze medal. The team had a fairly easy win over Luxembourg in the first round before requiring extra time to defeat Sweden in the quarterfinals. In the semifinals, the Netherlands lost to eventual gold-medalist Belgium. This relegated the Dutch team to the consolation tournament for silver; they received a bye into the consolation final when France turned out to have left the Olympics. In the match for silver and bronze, the Netherlands were defeated by Spain to finish in third place.

First round

28 August 1920

Netherlands	3–0	Luxembourg
J. Bulder 30'; Groosjohan 47' 85'	Report

La Butte, Brussels
Attendance: 3,000
Referee: Georges Hubrecht (BEL)

Quarterfinals

29 August 1920

Netherlands	5–4 (a.e.t.)	Sweden
Groosjohan 10' 57'; J. Bulder 44' 88' (pen.) de Natris 115'	Report	Karlsson 16' 32'; Olsson 20'; Dahl 72'

Broodstraat, Antwerp
Attendance: 5,000
Referee: Josef Fanta (TCH)

Semifinals

31 August 1920

Belgium	3–0	Netherlands
Larnoe 46'; Van Hege 55'; Bragard 85'	Report

Olympisch Stadion, Antwerp
Attendance: 22,000
Referee: John Lewis (GBR)

Consolation final

5 September 1920

Spain	3–1	Netherlands
Sesúmaga 7' 35'; Pichichi 72'	Report	Groosjohan 68'

Olympic Stadium, Antwerp
Attendance: 14,000
Referee: Paul Putz (BEL)

Final rank
(bronze) Bronze

== Rowing ==
Twelve rowers represented the Netherlands in 1920. It was the nation's third appearance in the sport. None of the three Dutch boats advanced to the finals.

Ranks given are within the heat.

Rower	Cox	Event	Quarterfinals		Semifinals		Final	
Rower	Cox	Event	Result	Rank	Result	Rank	Result	Rank
Frits Eijken	N/A	Single sculls	7:50.0	1 Q	7:50.4	2	Did not advance	
Koos de Haas; Bastiaan Veth	N/A	Double sculls	N/A		7:24.8	2	Did not advance	
Robbert Blaisse; Huibert Boumeester; Johannes Haasnoot; Willem Hudig; Philip Jongeneel; Frederik Koopman; Bernard te Hennepe; Johannes van der Vegte	Liong Siang Sie	Eight	6:38.2	2	Did not advance			

== Sailing ==
Eight sailors represented the Netherlands in 1920. It was the nation's second appearance in the sport. The Dutch had their best possible result, with two gold medals and one silver. The two Dutch 12-footers were the only boats to contest that event, while the 6½ metre team defeated a French boat.

Sailors	Class	Race 1		Race 2		Race 3		Total	
Sailors	Class	Result	Rank	Result	Rank	Result	Rank	Score	Rank
Petrus Beukers; Arnoud van der Biesen	12 foot	Unknown							2nd place, silver medalist(s)
Bernard Carp; Johan Carp; Petrus Wernink	6½ metre (1919)	Unknown							1st place, gold medalist(s)
Cornelis Hin; Frans Hin; Johan Hin	12 foot	Unknown							1st place, gold medalist(s)

== Shooting ==
Fifteen shooters represented the Netherlands in 1920. It was the nation's fourth appearance in the sport. Klaas Jan Pen competed, but it is not known in which event.

Shooter	Event	Final	
Shooter	Event	Result	Rank
Antonius Bouwens	50 m free pistol	444	Unknown
Antonius Bouwens	300 m free rifle, 3 pos.	909	Unknown
Herman Bouwens	50 m free pistol	394	Unknown
Herman Bouwens	300 m free rifle, 3 pos.	841	Unknown
Jan Brussaard	300 m free rifle, 3 pos.	866	Unknown
Emile Jurgens	Trap	Unknown	
Christiaan Moltzer	Trap	Unknown	
Cornelis van Altenburg	50 m free pistol	397	Unknown
Cornelis van Dalen	300 m free rifle, 3 pos.	828	Unknown
Gerard van den Bergh	50 m free pistol	445	Unknown
Gerard van den Bergh	300 m free rifle, 3 pos.	939	Unknown
Klaas Woldendorp	50 m free pistol	443	Unknown
Antonius Bouwens; Herman Bouwens; Jan Brussaard; Cornelis van Dalen; Gerard van den Bergh	Team free rifle	4383	8
Antonius Bouwens; Herman Bouwens; Jan Brussaard; Cornelis van Dalen; Gerard van den Bergh	300 m team military rifle, prone	269	12
Antonius Bouwens; Herman Bouwens; Jan Brussaard; Cornelis van Dalen; Gerard van den Bergh	300 m team military rifle, standing	228	10
Antonius Bouwens; Herman Bouwens; Jan Brussaard; Cornelis van Dalen; Gerard van den Bergh	600 m team military rifle, prone	266	9
Antonius Bouwens; Herman Bouwens; Jan Brussaard; Cornelis van Dalen; Gerard van den Bergh	300 & 600 m team military rifle, prone	495	13
Antonius Bouwens; Herman Bouwens; Cornelis van Altenburg; Gerard van den Berg; Klaas Woldendorp	50 m team free pistol	2123	10
Reindert de Favauge; Emile Jurgens; Franciscus Jurgens; Cornelis van der Vliet; Eduardus van Voorst tot Voorst; Pieter Waller	Team clay pigeons	222	6

== Tug of war ==
The Netherlands competed in the Olympic tug of war tournament for the first time in 1920, the final appearance of the sport in the Olympics. The Bergvall System was used in 1920. The Dutch beat Italy in the semifinals to advance to the final against Great Britain. There they lost to the British, and had to continue in the silver medal rounds. The Netherlands received a bye into the silver medal finals, where they beat Belgium to take the silver.

All matches were best-of-three pulls.

Semifinals

Netherlands	2–0	Italy

Final

Great Britain	2–0	Netherlands

Silver medal match

Belgium	0–2	Netherlands

Final rank
(silver) Silver

== Weightlifting ==
Five weightlifters represented the Netherlands in 1920. It was the nation's debut in the sport. Ringelberg's fourth-place finish was the best of the year for the Dutch weightlifters.

Weightlifter	Event	Final	
Weightlifter	Event	Result	Rank
Pieter Belmer	75 kg	165.0	8
Marinus Ringelberg	75 kg	225.0	4
Joop Tijman	60 kg	185.0	9
Wilhelmus van Nimwegen	67.5 kg	210.0	8
Jan Welter	82.5 kg	230.0	7

== Wrestling ==
Nine wrestlers, all in the Greco-Roman discipline, competed for the Netherlands in 1920. It was the nation's third appearance in the sport. The Dutch wrestlers won no medals, but came close in a few instances. The format turned out to be particularly unfortunate for Jan Sint, who advanced to the final in the light heavyweight but finished without a medal after being defeated by Johansson in the final and losing again in the silver medal semifinal. Jaap Sjouwerman advanced to the heavyweight semifinals, but did not get a chance to compete for silver or bronze after his semifinal loss to an opponent who did not win gold or silver.

=== Greco-Roman ===
Wrestler	Event	Round of 32	Round of 16	Quarterfinals	Semifinals	Finals	Rank
Wrestler	Event	Round of 32	Round of 16	Silver quarters	Silver semis	Silver match	Rank
Wrestler	Event	Round of 32	Round of 16	Bronze quarters	Bronze semis	Bronze match	Rank
Barend Bonneveld	Heavyweight	Did not advance	Ahlgren (SWE) (L)	Did not advance			12
Barend Bonneveld	Heavyweight	Did not advance	Ahlgren (SWE) (L)	Did not advance			12
Barend Bonneveld	Heavyweight	Did not advance	Ahlgren (SWE) (L)	Did not advance			12
Carl Coerse	Lightweight	Bainconneau (FRA) (W)	Halík (TCH) (W)	Andersen (NOR) (L)	Did not advance		10
Carl Coerse	Lightweight	Bainconneau (FRA) (W)	Halík (TCH) (W)	Did not advance			10
Carl Coerse	Lightweight	Bainconneau (FRA) (W)	Halík (TCH) (W)	Did not advance			10
Johannes Eillebrecht	Middleweight	Westergren (SWE) (L)	Did not advance	Did not advance			5
Johannes Eillebrecht	Middleweight	Westergren (SWE) (L)	Did not advance	Bye	Lindfors (FIN) (L)	Did not advance	5
Johannes Eillebrecht	Middleweight	Westergren (SWE) (L)	Did not advance	Balej (TCH) (W)	Perttilä (FIN) (L)	Did not advance	5
Willem Leloux	Middleweight	Nielsen (DEN) (L)	Did not advance	Did not advance			19
Willem Leloux	Middleweight	Nielsen (DEN) (L)	Did not advance	Did not advance			19
Willem Leloux	Middleweight	Nielsen (DEN) (L)	Did not advance	Did not advance			19
Johannes Nolton	Lightweight	Lindberg (SWE) (L)	Did not advance	Did not advance			18
Johannes Nolton	Lightweight	Lindberg (SWE) (L)	Did not advance	Did not advance			18
Johannes Nolton	Lightweight	Lindberg (SWE) (L)	Did not advance	Did not advance			18
Willem Roels	Featherweight	Boumans (BEL) (L)	Did not advance	Did not advance			17
Willem Roels	Featherweight	Boumans (BEL) (L)	Did not advance	N/A	Did not advance		17
Willem Roels	Featherweight	Boumans (BEL) (L)	Did not advance	Did not advance			17
Jan Sint	Light heavyweight	Bye	Testoni (ITA) (W)	Snoeck (BEL) (W)	Wahlem (BEL) (W)	Johansson (SWE) (L)	4
Jan Sint	Light heavyweight	Bye	Testoni (ITA) (W)	N/A	Eriksen (DEN) (L)	Did not advance	4
Jan Sint	Light heavyweight	Bye	Testoni (ITA) (W)	N/A			4
Jaap Sjouwerman	Heavyweight	Did not advance	Vergos (GRE) (W)	Nilsson (SWE) (W)	Ahlgren (SWE) (L)	Did not advance	9
Jaap Sjouwerman	Heavyweight	Did not advance	Vergos (GRE) (W)	Did not advance			9
Jaap Sjouwerman	Heavyweight	Did not advance	Vergos (GRE) (W)	Did not advance			9
Johannes van Maaren	Featherweight	Gallery (USA) (L)	Did not advance	Did not advance			17
Johannes van Maaren	Featherweight	Gallery (USA) (L)	Did not advance	N/A	Did not advance		17
Johannes van Maaren	Featherweight	Gallery (USA) (L)	Did not advance	Did not advance			17

Opponent nation	Wins	Losses	Percent
Belgium	2	1	.667
Czechoslovakia	2	0	1.000
Denmark	0	2	.000
Finland	0	2	.000
France	1	0	1.000
Greece	1	0	1.000
Italy	1	0	1.000
Norway	0	1	.000
Sweden	1	5	.167
United States	0	1	.000
Total	8	12	.400

Round	Wins	Losses	Percent
Round of 32	1	5	.167
Round of 16	3	1	.750
Quarterfinals	2	1	.667
Semifinals	1	1	.500
Final	0	1	.000
Silver quarterfinals	0	0	–
Silver semifinals	0	2	.000
Silver match	0	0	–
Bronze quarterfinals	1	0	1.000
Bronze semifinals	0	1	.000
Bronze match	0	0	–
Total	8	12	.400

== Demonstration sports ==
=== Korfball ===
Organized by the Dutch Korfball Association, two Dutch teams gave a korfball demonstration, with a match on 22 August in the Olympisch Stadion.
