= The Boat Race 1921 =

73rd Boat Race
- Date: 30 March 1921
- Winner: Cambridge
- Margin of victory: 1 length
- Winning time: 19 minutes 45 seconds
- Overall record (Cambridge–Oxford): 33–39
- Umpire: Frederick I. Pitman (Cambridge)

The 73rd Boat Race took place on 30 March 1921. Held annually, the Boat Race is a side-by-side rowing race between crews from the Universities of Oxford and Cambridge along the River Thames. Cambridge, with the heavier crew, went into the race as reigning champions, having won the previous year's race. In total, nine of the participants in this year's race had previous Boat Race experience, and five had won a silver medal in the 1920 Summer Olympics. In this year's race, umpired by former rower Frederick I. Pitman, Cambridge won by one length in a time of 19 minutes 45 seconds. It was Cambridge's third consecutive win, the fastest winning time since 1913 and the narrowest margin of victory since 1913. The result took the overall record to 39–33 in Oxford's favour.

== Background ==
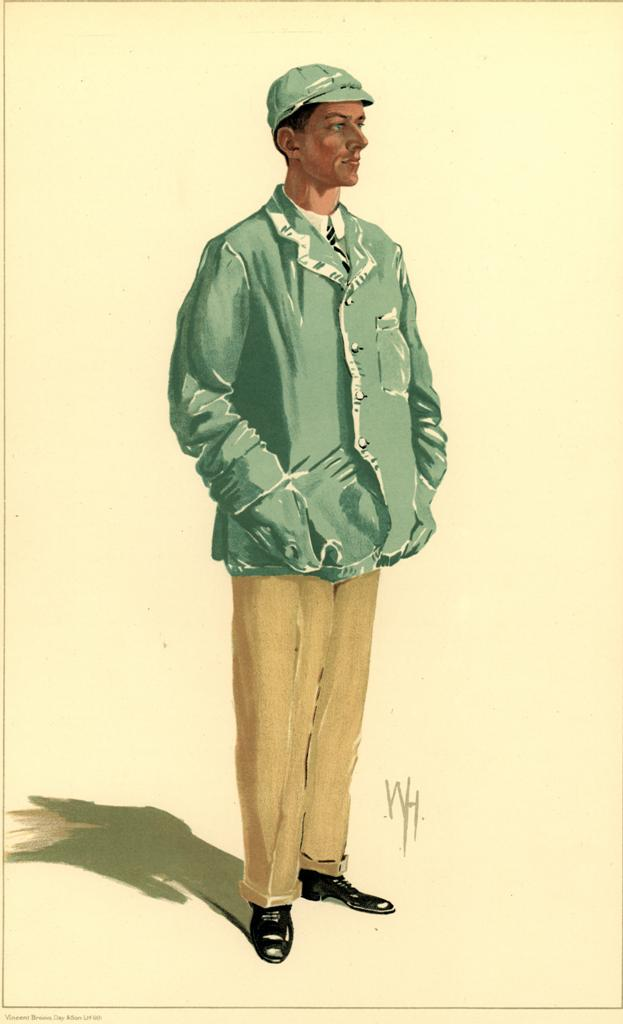
Sidney Swann coached the Cambridge crew.

The Boat Race is a side-by-side rowing competition between the University of Oxford (sometimes referred to as the "Dark Blues") and the University of Cambridge (sometimes referred to as the "Light Blues"). The race was first held in 1829, and since 1845 has taken place on the 4.2-mile (6.8 km) Championship Course on the River Thames in southwest London. The rivalry is a major point of honour between the two universities and followed throughout the United Kingdom and worldwide. Cambridge went into the race as reigning champions, having won the 1920 race by four lengths; Oxford led overall with 39 victories to Cambridge's 32 (excluding the "dead heat" of 1877).

Oxford were coached by H. R. Baker (who rowed for the Dark Blues in the 1908 and 1909 races), G. C. Bourne who had rowed for the university in the 1882 and 1883 races, C. D. Burnell (a Blue from 1895 to 1898) and R. P. P. Rowe who had rowed four times between 1889 and 1892. Cambridge's coaches were John Houghton Gibbon, who had rowed for the Light Blues in the 1899 and 1900 races, Sidney Swann (who had rowed in the four races from 1911 to 1914) and G. E. Tower (who had rowed in 1913 and 1914). For the thirteenth year the umpire was old Etonian Frederick I. Pitman who rowed for Cambridge in the 1884, 1885 and 1886 races.

== Crews ==
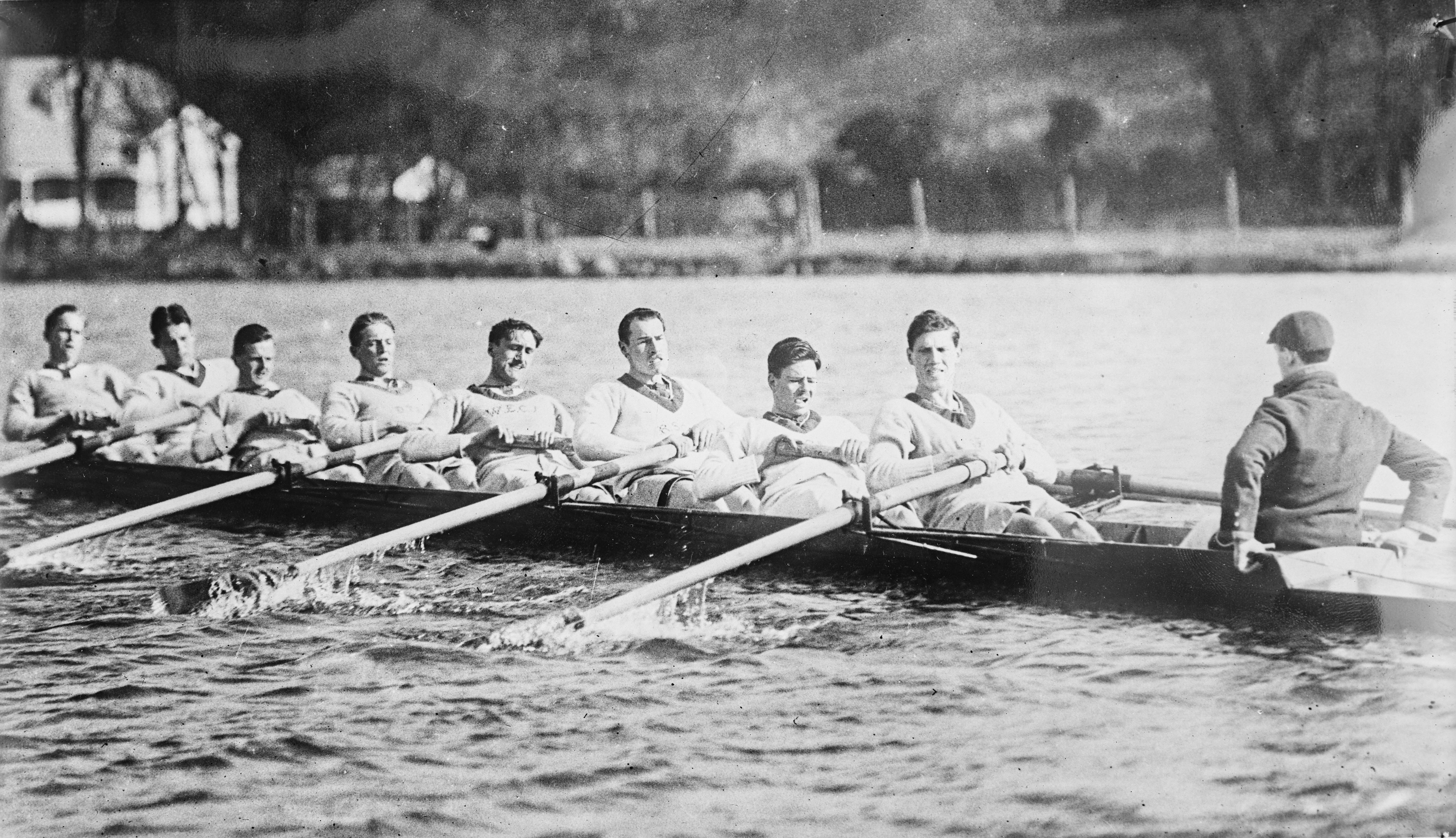
The Oxford crew

The Cambridge crew weighed an average of 12 st 11.75 lb (81.3 kg), 4.25 pounds (1.9 kg) per rower more than their opponents. Oxford's crew contained five participants with Boat Race experience, while Cambridge saw four of the 1920 crew return. Five of the participants were silver medallists in the men's eight at the 1920 Summer Olympics: Oxford's Sebastian Earl, Walter James, Richard Lucas and Guy Oliver Nickalls, and Cambridge's John Campbell. Two rowers were registered as non-British, Oxford's Francis Bacon Lothrop was American while Cambridge's Campbell hailed from Australia.

Seat	Oxford			Cambridge		
Seat	Name	College	Weight	Name	College	Weight
Bow	M. H. Ellis	Keble	10 st 6 lb	H. O. C. Boret	3rd Trinity	12 st 7 lb
2	P. C. Mallam	Queen's	11 st 6.75 lb	A. G. W. Penney	Pembroke	13 st 4 lb
3	S. Earl	Magdalen	12 st 9 lb	A. B. Ritchie	Trinity Hall	13 st 7 lb
4	F. B. Lothrop	Trinity	13 st 5 lb	A. D. B. Pearson	1st Trinity	13 st 7 lb
5	W. E. C. James (P)	Magdalen	13 st 6 lb	H. B. Playford	Jesus	13 st 10 lb
6	R. S. C. Lucas	Magdalen	13 st 7.5 lb	J. A. Campbell	Jesus	13 st 2 lb
7	G. O. Nickalls	Magdalen	12 st 6 lb	Hon. J. W. H. Fremantle	3rd Trinity	12 st 0 lb
Stroke	D. T. Raikes	Merton	13 st 4 lb	P. H. G. H.-S. Hartley (P)	Lady Margaret Boat Club	11 st 1 lb
Cox	W. H. Porritt	Magdalen	8 st 10 lb	L. E. Stephens	Trinity Hall	8 st 11 lb
Source: (P) – boat club president

== Race ==
The Championship Course along which the Boat Race is contested

Oxford won the toss and elected to start from the Surrey station, handing the Middlesex side of the river to Cambridge. Pitman, the umpire, started the race on a "moderate tide" in good conditions at 5:00 p.m. Cambridge made the quicker start, outrating Oxford and holding a half-length lead by the time the crews reached Craven Steps. Gaining further, the Light Blues were a quarter of a length clear of the Dark Blues by the Mile Post. At this point, the Cambridge boat attempted to cross into the Surrey side of the river, but Oxford responded and surged to become level by the time the crews passed below Hammersmith Bridge.

As the course of the river now favoured Oxford, they pulled away and, according to author and former Dark Blue rower George Drinkwater, after a "ding-dong struggle" held a half-length lead by Barnes Bridge. Oxford were forced to allow the Light Blue space; the Cambridge stroke P. H. G. H-S. Hartley took advantage and spurted to push the Dark Blues off their line. The bend in the river now favouring Cambridge, they levelled proceedings and pushed on to win by one length in a time of 19 minutes 45 seconds. It was their third consecutive victory, the fastest winning time since the 1911 race and the narrowest winning margin since the 1913 race. It took the overall record in the event to 39–33 in Oxford's favour.
