= Magdalen College Boat Club =

British rowing club

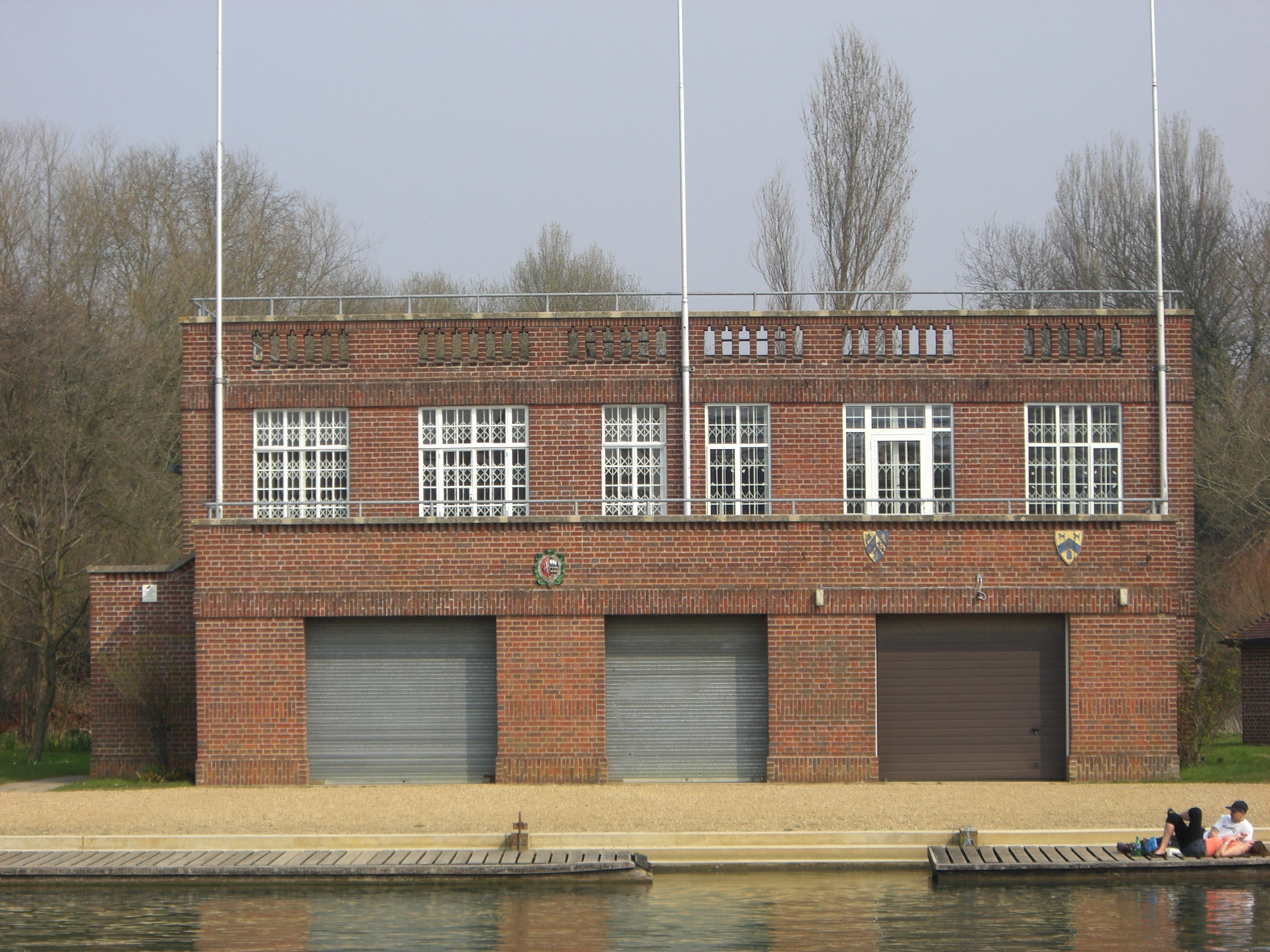

- Boathouse (building shared with Linacre, LMH & Trinity)
- Location: Boathouse Island, Christ Church Meadow, Oxford, Oxford
- Coordinates: 51.742683°N 1.248536°W
- Home water: The Isis
- Founded: 1859; 167 years ago
- University: University of Oxford
- Affiliations: British Rowing (boat code MAG); Magdalene Boat Club (Sister college)
- Website: www.magdalenboatclub.co.uk/index.html

Magdalen College Boat Club (MCBC) is a rowing club for members of Magdalen College, Oxford. It is based on the Isis at Boathouse Island, Christ Church Meadow, Oxford.

== History ==
MCBC was founded in 1859 and shares a boathouse (built 1939) with the college boat clubs of Linacre, Lady Margaret Hall and Trinity. The club has produced two Olympic Gold medal winners and has a very successful record of providing rowers for The Boat Races.

The boat club also represents All Souls College, Oxford but there is only one recorded rower from All Souls having participated in The Boat Race and that was Dick Eason in The Boat Race 1924.

Magdalen have won the men's Eights Week regatta 20 times, the last being in 2007.

== Honours ==
=== Henley Royal Regatta ===
Year	Races won
1846	Diamond Challenge Sculls
1865	Diamond Challenge Sculls
1866	Diamond Challenge Sculls
1872	Diamond Challenge Sculls
1884	Diamond Challenge Sculls
1885	Diamond Challenge Sculls
1888	Diamond Challenge Sculls
1889	Diamond Challenge Sculls
1890	Diamond Challenge Sculls
1891	Diamond Challenge Sculls
1893	Stewards' Challenge Cup, Diamond Challenge Sculls
1899	Stewards' Challenge Cup
1903	Ladies' Challenge Plate
1907	Stewards' Challenge Cup, Wyfold Challenge Cup, Visitors' Challenge Cup
1908	Stewards' Challenge Cup, Visitors' Challenge Cup
1910	Grand Challenge Cup
1911	Grand Challenge Cup
1920	Grand Challenge Cup, Stewards' Challenge Cup, Silver Goblets & Nickalls' Challenge Cup
1921	Grand Challenge Cup, Stewards' Challenge Cup
1922	Silver Goblets & Nickalls' Challenge Cup
1923	Visitors' Challenge Cup
1948	Visitors' Challenge Cup
1953	Visitors' Challenge Cup
1960	Silver Goblets & Nickalls' Challenge Cup

=== Boat Race representatives ===
The following rowers were part of the rowing club at the time of their participation in The Boat Race.

Men

Year	Name
1836	T. Harris
1858	H. Austen
1860	G. Norsworthy
1872	A. W. Nicholson
1872	Courtenay Knollys
1873	Courtenay Knollys
1873	A. W. Nicholson
1874	A. W. Nicholson
1877	H. Pelham
1878	H. Pelham
1879	J. H. T. Wharton
1880	J. H. T. Wharton
1881	J. H. T. Wharton
1882	A. H. Higgins
1885	W. S. Unwin
1885	H. Girdlestone
1886	W. S. Unwin
1886	H. Girdlestone
1887	G. Nickalls
1888	A. P. Parker
1888	G. Nickalls
1889	R. P. P. Rowe
1889	G. Nickalls
1890	G. Nickalls
1890	R. P. P. Rowe
1891	W. M. Poole
1891	R. P. P. Rowe
1891	V. Nickalls
1891	G. Nickalls
1892	H. B. Cotton
1892	V. Nickalls
1892	W. A. L. Fletcher
1892	C. M. Pitman
1893	H. B. Cotton
1893	V. Nickalls
1893	W. A. L. Fletcher
1893	M. C. Pilkington
1894	H. B. Cotton
1894	M. C. Pilkington
1894	E. G. Tew
1895	H. B. Cotton
1895	M. C. Pilkington
1895	C. D. Burnell
1896	E. C. Sherwood
1896	C. D. Burnell
1896	R. Carr
1896	H. G. Gold
1897	C. D. Burnell
1897	R. Carr
1897	H. G. Gold
1898	C. D. Burnell
1898	R. Carr
1898	H. G. Gold
1899	H. G. Gold
1899	G. S. Maclagan +
1900	H. H. Dutton
1900	C. P. Rowley
1900	G. S. Maclagan +

Year	Name
1901	G. S. Maclagan +
1902	G. S. Maclagan +
1903	C. A. Willis
1906	A. G. Kirby
1907	J. A. Gillan
1907	A. G. Kirby
1907	A. W. F. Donkin +
1908	R. P. Stanhope
1908	C. R. Cudmore
1908	E. H. L. Southwell
1908	A. G. Kirby
1908	A. W. F. Donkin +
1909	C. R. Cudmore
1909	A. S. Garton
1909	D. Mackinnon
1909	J. A. Gillan
1909	A. G. Kirby
1909	A. W. F. Donkin +
1910	D. Mackinnon
1910	A. S. Garton
1910	P. Fleming
1910	A. W. F. Donkin +
1911	L. G. Wormald
1911	R. E. Burgess
1911	E. J. H. V. Millington-Drake
1911	A. S. Garton
1911	D. Mackinnon
1911	H. Bensley Wells +
1912	L. G. Wormald
1912	E. D. Horsfall
1912	H. Bensley Wells +
1913	E. R. Burgess
1913	C. L. Bailieu
1913	L. G. Wormald
1913	E. D. Horsfall
1913	H. Bensley Wells +
1914	E. D. Horsfall
1914	H. Bensley Wells +
1920	S. Earl
1920	A. T. M Durand
1920	W. E. C. James
1920	W. H. Porritt
1921	S. Earl
1921	W. E. C. James
1921	R. S. C. Lucas
1921	G. O. Nickalls
1921	W. H. Porritt +
1922	S. Earl
1922	G. O. Nickalls
1922	W. H. Porritt +
1923	G. O. Nickalls
1923	G. D. Clapperton +
1924	Dick Eason ^
1924	G. D. Clapperton +
1927	P. Johnson
1928	M. C. Graham
1929	J. M. Macdonald
1929	J. A. Ingles

Year	Name
1933	C. Komarakul-Na-Nagara +
1936	J. D. Sturrock
1937	R. R. Stewart
1937	J. D. Sturrock
1938	J. L. Garton
1938	R. R. Stewart
1938	H. A. W. Forbes
1939	J. L. Garton
1939	R. R. Stewart
1939	R. D. Burnell
1939	H. A. W. Forbes
1946	J. R. W. Gleave
1946	R. Ebsworth Snow +
1947	D. G. Jamieson
1947	J. R. W. Gleave
1948	J. R. W. Gleave
1949	A. J. M. Cavenagh
1949	J. M. Clay
1950	H. J. Renton
1950	J. M. Clay
1950	A. J. M. Cavenagh
1951	H. J. Renton
1954	J. A. Gobbo
1955	J. A. Gobbo
1955	D. P. Wells
1959	A. T. Lindsay
1959	D. C. Rutherford
1960	A. T. Lindsay
1960	D. C. Rutherford
1962	P. C. D. Burnell
1966	R. A. D. Freeman
1972	M. A. Magerery
1973	M. R. Magarvey
1980	M. D. Andrews
1982	H. E. Clay
1983	W. J. Lang
1983	H. E. Clay
1984	W. J. Lang
1984	S. R. Lesser +
1985	W. J. Lang
1985	F. M. Reininger
1985	S. R. Lesser +
2003	Henry Morris
2019	Tobias Schröder
2021	Tobias Schröder
2023	Tom Sharrock
2025	Tom Sharrock
2025	Tobias Bernard +
2026	Tobias Bernard +

Women

Year	Name
2015	Maxie Scheske
2023	Freya Willis

Key

- + = Coxswain
- ^ = represented All Souls College

== See also ==
- University rowing (UK)
- Oxford University Boat Club
- Rowing on the River Thames
