= The Boat Race 1920 =

72nd Boat Race
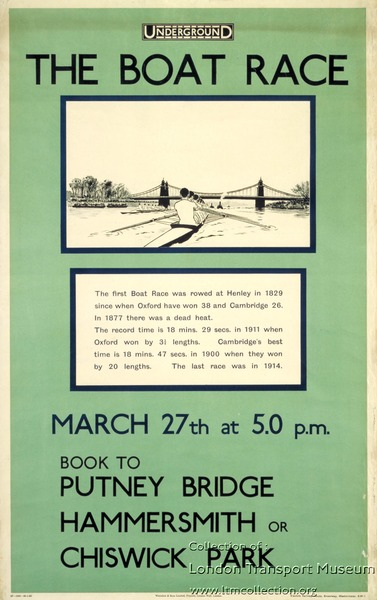
- London Underground poster advertising the 1920 Boat Race
- Date: 27 March 1920
- Winner: Cambridge
- Margin of victory: 4 lengths
- Winning time: 21 minutes 11 seconds
- Overall record (Cambridge–Oxford): 32–39
- Umpire: Frederick I. Pitman (Cambridge)

The 72nd Boat Race took place on 27 March 1920. Generally held annually, the Boat Race is a side-by-side rowing race between crews from the Universities of Oxford and Cambridge along the River Thames. As a result of the First World War, this was the first race for six years: Oxford went into the race as reigning champions, having won the previous race held in 1914. Both universities had participated in various Peace Regattas in 1919. In this year's race, umpired by former rower Frederick I. Pitman, Cambridge won by four lengths in a time of 21 minutes 11 seconds. The victory took the overall record to 39–32 in Oxford's favour.

== Background ==
The Boat Race is a side-by-side rowing competition between the University of Oxford (sometimes referred to as the "Dark Blues") and the University of Cambridge (sometimes referred to as the "Light Blues"). The race was first held in 1829, and since 1845 has taken place on the 4.2-mile (6.8 km) Championship Course on the River Thames in southwest London. The rivalry is a major point of honour between the two universities and followed throughout the United Kingdom and worldwide. Oxford went into the race as reigning champions, having won the 1914 race by four and a half lengths, and led overall with 39 victories to Cambridge's 31 (excluding the "dead heat" of 1877).

The First World War caused a six-year hiatus in the event: during the conflict, at least 42 Oxbridge Blues were killed, including four of the previous race's Cambridge crew and one from the Oxford boat. No race was arranged for 1919, but the crews participated in the Peace Regatta at the Henley Royal Regatta that year. Taking part in the King's Cup, Cambridge were defeated by the Australian Army crew in the semi-final, the latter going on to defeat Oxford in the final. The Light Blues also took part in the Inter Allied Peace Regatta in Paris the same year, victorious in the final against New Zealand and Australia crews.

Oxford were coached by R. W. Arbuthnot (who had rowed for Cambridge four times between 1909 and 1912), Harcourt Gilbey Gold (Dark Blue president for the 1900 race and four-time Blue) and E. D. Horsfall (who had rowed in the three races prior to the war). Cambridge's coaches were Steve Fairbairn (who had rowed in the 1882, 1883, 1886 and 1887 races) and Sidney Swann (who had rowed in the previous four races). For the twelfth year the umpire was Old Etonian Frederick I. Pitman who rowed for Cambridge in the 1884, 1885 and 1886 races. He was accompanied on his launch by Prince Albert and Prince Henry, Duke of Gloucester.

== Crews ==
The Cambridge crew weighed an average of 12 st 9 lb (80.1 kg), 1.25 pounds (0.6 kg) per rower more than their opponents. As a result of the six-year hiatus, none of the participants had rowed in the Boat Race prior to this year. Three of the participants in the race were registered as non-British: Oxford's Hugh Cairns and Neil Harcourt MacNeil, and Cambridge's John Alan Campbell were all Australian.

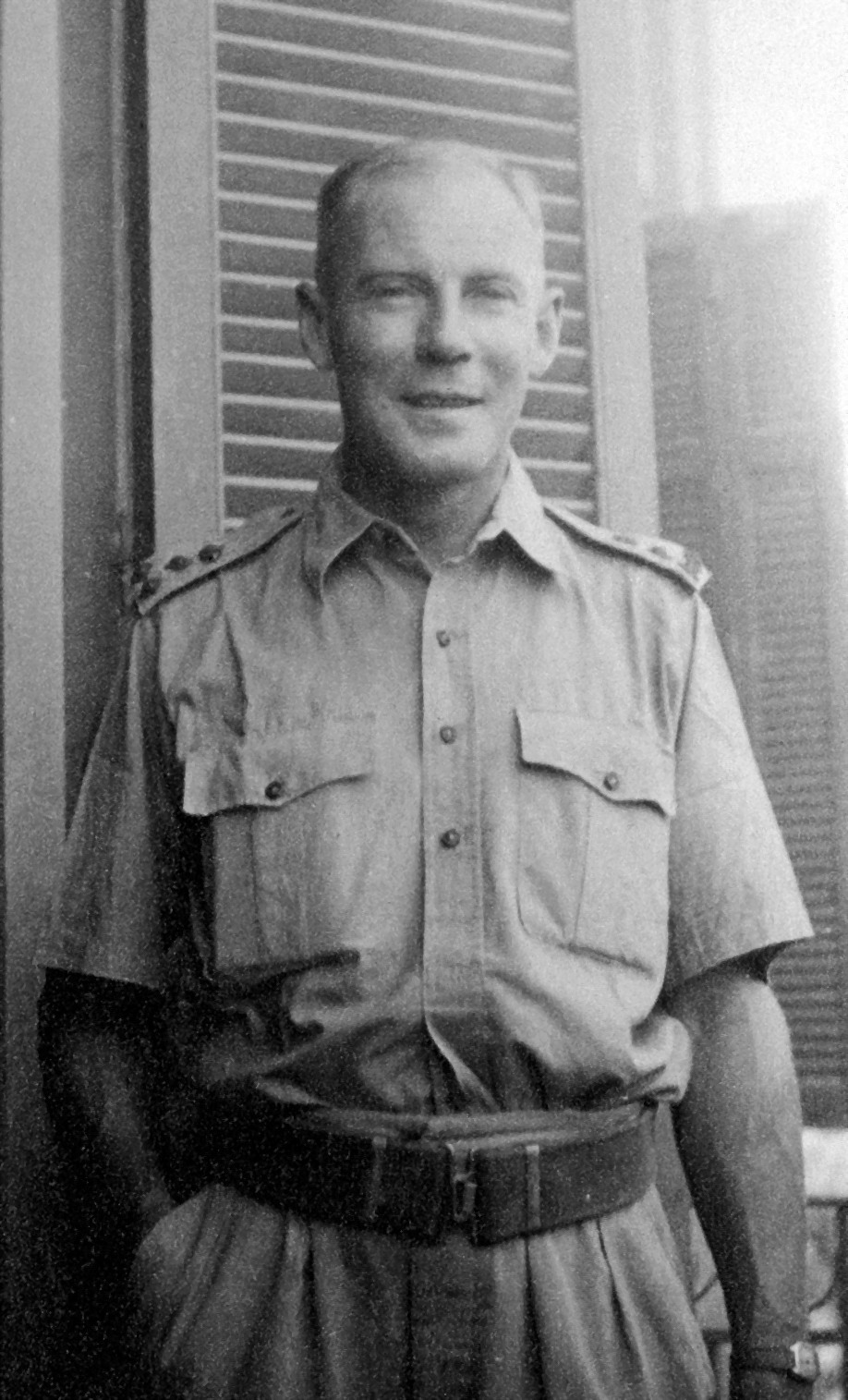
Hugh Cairns rowed at number seven for Oxford.

Seat	Oxford			Cambridge		
Seat	Name	College	Weight	Name	College	Weight
Bow	S. Earl	Magdalen	12 st 6.5 lb	H. O. C. Boret	3rd Trinity	12 st 1 lb
2	N. H. MacNeil	Balliol	12 st 0 lb	J. H. Simpson	Pembroke	13 st 0 lb
3	A. T. M Durand	Magdalen	13 st 0 lb	A. F. W Dixon	Christ's	12 st 11 lb
4	A. C. Hill	St John's	13 st 8.5 lb	R. L. L. McEwan	3rd Trinity	13 st 8 lb
5	D. T. Raikes	Merton	13 st 7 lb	H. B. Playford	Jesus	13 st 5 lb
6	W. E. C. James (P)	Magdalen	13 st 8.5 lb	J. A. Cambell	Jesus	13 st 5 lb
7	H. W. B. Cairns	Balliol	12 st 0 lb	A. Swann	Trinity Hall	12 st 0.5 lb
Stroke	M. H. Ellis	Keble	10 st 4.5 lb	P. H. G. H. -S. Hartley (P)	Lady Margaret Boat Club	10 st 10.25 lb
Cox	W. H. Porritt	Magdalen	8 st 9.5 lb	E. T. Johnstone	Christ's	8 st 11 lb
Source: (P) – boat club president

== Race ==
The Championship Course along which the Boat Race is contested

Cambridge won the toss and elected to start from the Surrey station, handing the Middlesex side of the river to Oxford. The race started at 5:40 p.m. with a fair tide in front of "immense crowds"; The Times reported that the attendance was the largest in the race's history despite a rainstorm an hour before the race start. Both crews rowed 38 strokes and were level for the first minute until Cambridge, slightly reducing their rating began to pull ahead, holding a canvas-length lead by the Mile Post.

As the crews passed below Hammersmith Bridge, the Light Blues held a three-quarter length lead and with the bend in the river in their favour, pulled further ahead to be a quarter of a length clear by The Doves pub. Facing a strong headwind, Oxford pulled in behind Cambridge and attempted a "bold bid for the inside of the Barnes corner". Cambridge spurted in response and passed below Barnes Bridge three lengths ahead, and extended their lead to four lengths by the time they passed the finishing post in a time of 22 minutes 11 seconds. According to author and former Oxford rower George Drinkwater, Cambridge "rowed and in nice easy fashion" while Oxford "were very uneven at times and the crew seemed to labour badly in the rough water." It was Cambridge's second consecutive victory, albeit over a six-year span, and took the overall record in the event to 39–32 in Oxford's favour.
