= Ruhlmann (surname) =

Ruhlmann, Ruhlman, Rühlmann, Ruehlmann is a surname. Notable people with the surname include:

- Émile Ruhlmann (rower) (1897–1975), French athlete
- Émile-Jacques Ruhlmann (1879–1933), French furniture designer and interior decorator
- Eugene P. Ruehlmann (1925–2013), American lawyer and politician
- François Ruhlmann (1868–1948), Belgian conductor
- Michael Ruhlman (born 1963), American author, home cook and entrepreneur
- Vanina Ruhlmann-Kleider (born 1961), French physicist
