= Rowing at the 1920 Summer Olympics – Men's eight =

Men's eight at the Games of the VII Olympiad
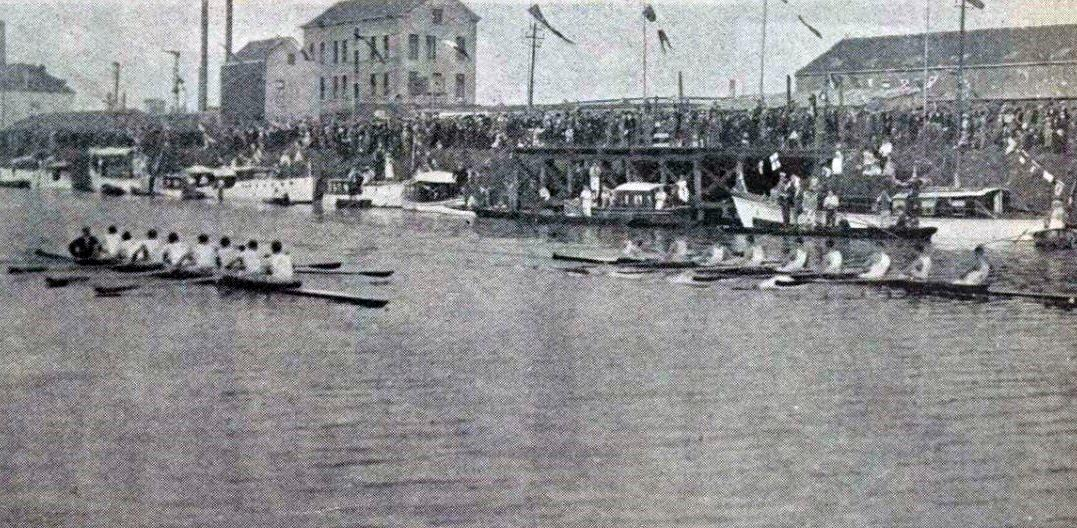
- A men's eight race at the 1920 Olympics
- Venue: Brussels–Scheldt Maritime Canal
- Dates: 28–29 August 1920
- Competitors: 72 from 8 nations
- Winning time: 6:05.0

Medalists
1st place, gold medalist(s)		United States: Sherm Clark (cox); Vince Gallagher; Edwin Graves; Virgil Jacomini; Donald Johnston; William Jordan; Clyde King; Edward Moore; Alden Sanborn
2nd place, silver medalist(s)		Great Britain: John Campbell; Sebastian Earl; Ewart Horsfall; Walter James; Robin Johnstone; Richard Lucas; Guy Oliver Nickalls; Ralph Shove; Sidney Swann
3rd place, bronze medalist(s)		Norway: Håkon Ellingsen; Thoralf Hagen; Thore Michelsen; Arne Mortensen; Karl Nag; Theodor Nag; Adolf Nilsen; Conrad Olsen; Tollef Tollefsen

The men's eight event was part of the rowing programme at the 1920 Summer Olympics. The competition was held on 28 and 29 August 1920. It was the fifth appearance of the event. Eight boats (72 competitors), each from a different nation, competed. It was the first time that nations were limited to a single boat. The event was won by the United States in a final against Great Britain; the two nations had taken all four previous gold medals (the United States winning in 1900 and 1904, when Great Britain did not compete; Great Britain winning in 1908 and 1912, when the United States did not compete). Bronze went to Norway, the nation's first medal in the men's eight. In addition to gold medals, the winners received a challenge prize that had been donated by Eugenio Brunetta d'Usseaux before his death in 1919.

== Background ==
This was the fifth appearance of the event. Rowing had been on the programme in 1896 but was cancelled due to bad weather. The men's eight has been held every time that rowing has been contested, beginning in 1900.

The two-time defending Olympic champion was the Leander Club of Great Britain. The United States had won the previous two Games, both times represented by the Vesper Boat Club; in 1920, the American squad came from the United States Naval Academy. The two teams were favoured at the 1920 Games. Another contender was Switzerland, the 1920 European Rowing Championships winners.

Czechoslovakia and Switzerland each made their debut in the event. Belgium, France, Great Britain, Norway, and the United States each made their third appearance, tying the absent Canada for most among nations to that point.

== Competition format ==
The "eight" event featured nine-person boats, with eight rowers and a coxswain. It was a sweep rowing event, with the rowers each having one oar (and thus each rowing on one side). The course used the 2000 metres distance that became the Olympic standard in 1912.

The 1920 tournament featured three rounds of one-on-one races; with 8 boats in the competition, the bracket was perfectly balanced. There were 4 quarterfinals, 2 semifinals, and a final.

== Schedule ==
Date	Time	Round
Friday, 27 August 1920	16:55	Quarterfinals
Saturday, 28 August 1920	17:20	Semifinals
Sunday, 29 August 1920	17:00	Final

== Results ==
=== Quarterfinals ===
==== Quarterfinal 1 ====
Rank	Rowers	Coxswain	Nation	Time	Notes
1	Theodor Nag; Conrad Olsen; Adolf Nilsen; Håkon Ellingsen; Thore Michelsen; Arne Mortensen; Karl Nag; Tollef Tollefsen	Thoralf Hagen	Norway	6:32.2	Q
2	Emil Ordnung; Ferdinand Brožek; Vladimír Širc; Bohdan Kallmünzer; Josef Širc; Jiří Kallmünzer; Otakar Votík; Ivan Schweizer	Karel Čížek	Czechoslovakia	6:43.0	

==== Quarterfinal 2 ====
Rank	Rowers	Coxswain	Nation	Time	Notes
1	Ewart Horsfall; Guy O. Nickalls; Richard Lucas; Walter James; John Campbell; Sebastian Earl; Ralph Shove; Sidney Swann	Robin Johnstone	Great Britain	6:19.0	Q
2	Hans Walter; Max Rudolf; Willy Brüderlin; Paul Rudolf; P. Baur; Franz Türler; Charles Freuler; Rudolf Bosshard	Paul Staub	Switzerland	6:21.4	

==== Quarterfinal 3 ====
Rank	Rowers	Coxswain	Nation	Time	Notes
1	Virgil Jacomini; Ed Graves; Bill Jordan; Ed Moore; Zeke Sanborn; Don Johnston; Vince Gallagher; Clyde King	Sherm Clark	United States	6:24.0	Q
2	Daniël Clarembaux; Jozef Hermans; Gustave De Mulder; René Smet; Félix Taymans; Charles Lalemand; Julien Crickx; Maurice Requillé	Joseph Crickx	Belgium	6:40.0	

==== Quarterfinal 4 ====
Rank	Rowers	Coxswain	Nation	Time	Notes
1	Albert Diebold; Charles Hahn; Frédéric Grossmann; Robert Fleig; Henri Barbenés; Frédéric Fleig; Charles Schlewer; Émile Ruhlmann	Ernest Barberolle	France	6:37.0	Q
2	Philip Jongeneel; Johannes van der Vegte; Bernard te Hennepe; Willem Hudig; Frederik Koopman; Huibert Boumeester; Johannes Haasnoot; Robbert Blaisse	Liong Siang Sie	Netherlands	6:38.2	

=== Semifinals ===
==== Semifinal 1 ====
Rank	Rowers	Coxswain	Nation	Time	Notes
1	Ewart Horsfall; Guy O. Nickalls; Richard Lucas; Walter James; John Campbell; Sebastian Earl; Ralph Shove; Sidney Swann	Robin Johnstone	Great Britain	6:26.4	Q
3rd place, bronze medalist(s)	Theodor Nag; Conrad Olsen; Adolf Nilsen; Håkon Ellingsen; Thore Michelsen; Arne Mortensen; Karl Nag; Tollef Tollefsen	Thoralf Hagen	Norway	6:36.0	

==== Semifinal 2 ====
Rank	Rowers	Coxswain	Nation	Time	Notes
1	Virgil Jacomini; Ed Graves; Bill Jordan; Ed Moore; Zeke Sanborn; Don Johnston; Vince Gallagher; Clyde King	Sherm Clark	United States	6:24.0	Q
2	Albert Diebold; Charles Hahn; Frédéric Grossmann; Robert Fleig; Henri Barbenés; Frédéric Fleig; Charles Schlewer; Émile Ruhlmann	Ernest Barberolle	France	6:42.6	

=== Final ===
Rank	Rowers	Coxswain	Nation	Time
1st place, gold medalist(s)	Virgil Jacomini; Ed Graves; Bill Jordan; Ed Moore; Zeke Sanborn; Don Johnston; Vince Gallagher; Clyde King	Sherm Clark	United States	6:05.0
2nd place, silver medalist(s)	Ewart Horsfall; Guy O. Nickalls; Richard Lucas; Walter James; John Campbell; Sebastian Earl; Ralph Shove; Sidney Swann	Robin Johnstone	Great Britain	6:05.8
