= The Boat Race 1913 =

70th Boat Race
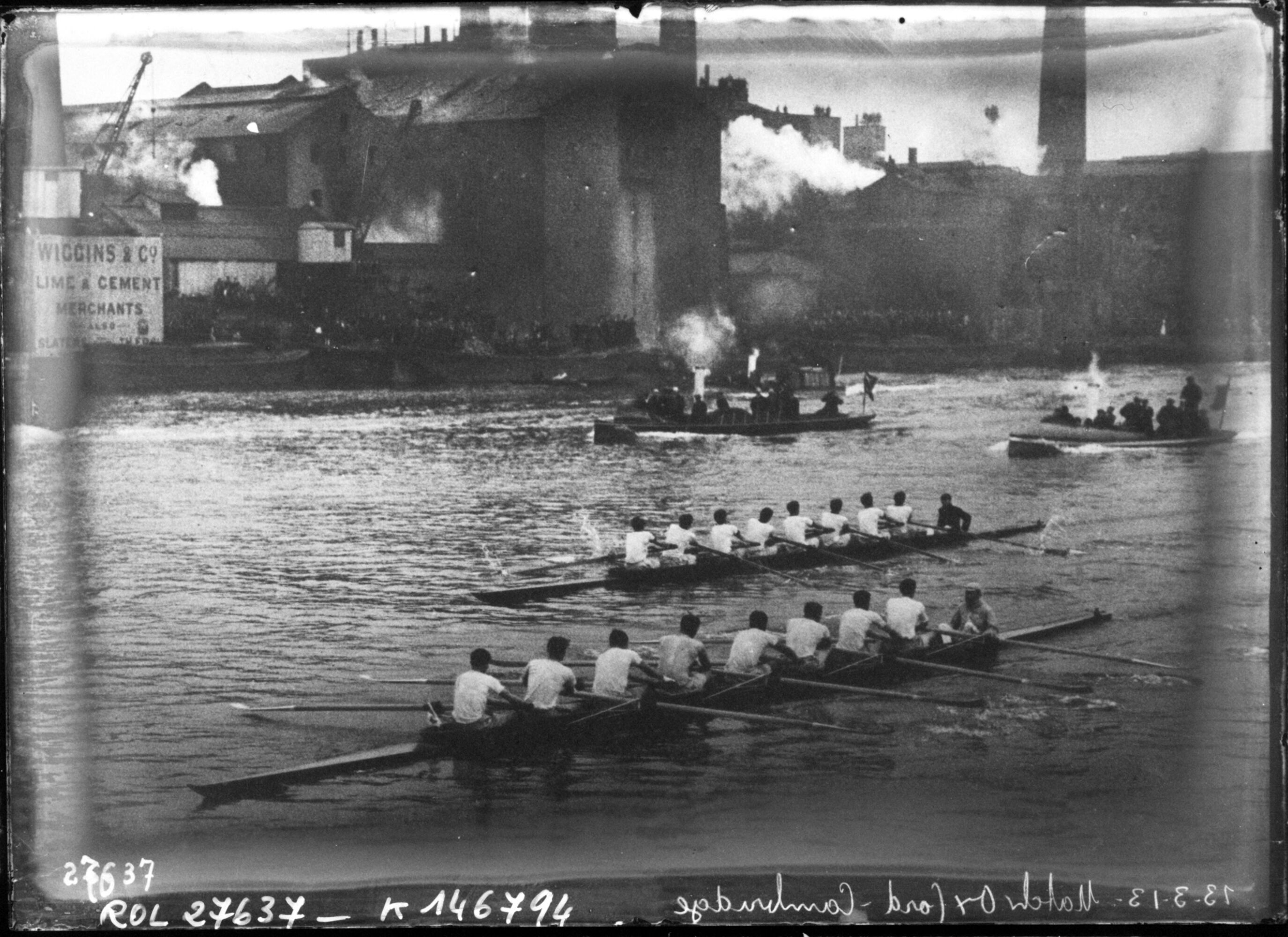
- Date: 13 March 1913
- Winner: Oxford
- Margin of victory: 3/4 length
- Winning time: 20 minutes 53 seconds
- Overall record (Cambridge–Oxford): 30–39
- Umpire: Frederick I. Pitman (Cambridge)

The 70th Boat Race took place on 13 March 1913. Held annually, the Boat Race is a side-by-side rowing race between crews from the Universities of Oxford and Cambridge along the River Thames. Oxford went into the race as reigning champions, having won the previous year's race. The two crews contained a total of five medallists from the 1912 Summer Olympics. Umpired by former Cambridge rower Frederick I. Pitman, Oxford won this year's race by three-quarters of a length in a time of 20 minutes 53 seconds. The victory took the overall record in the event to 39–30 in their favour.

== Background ==
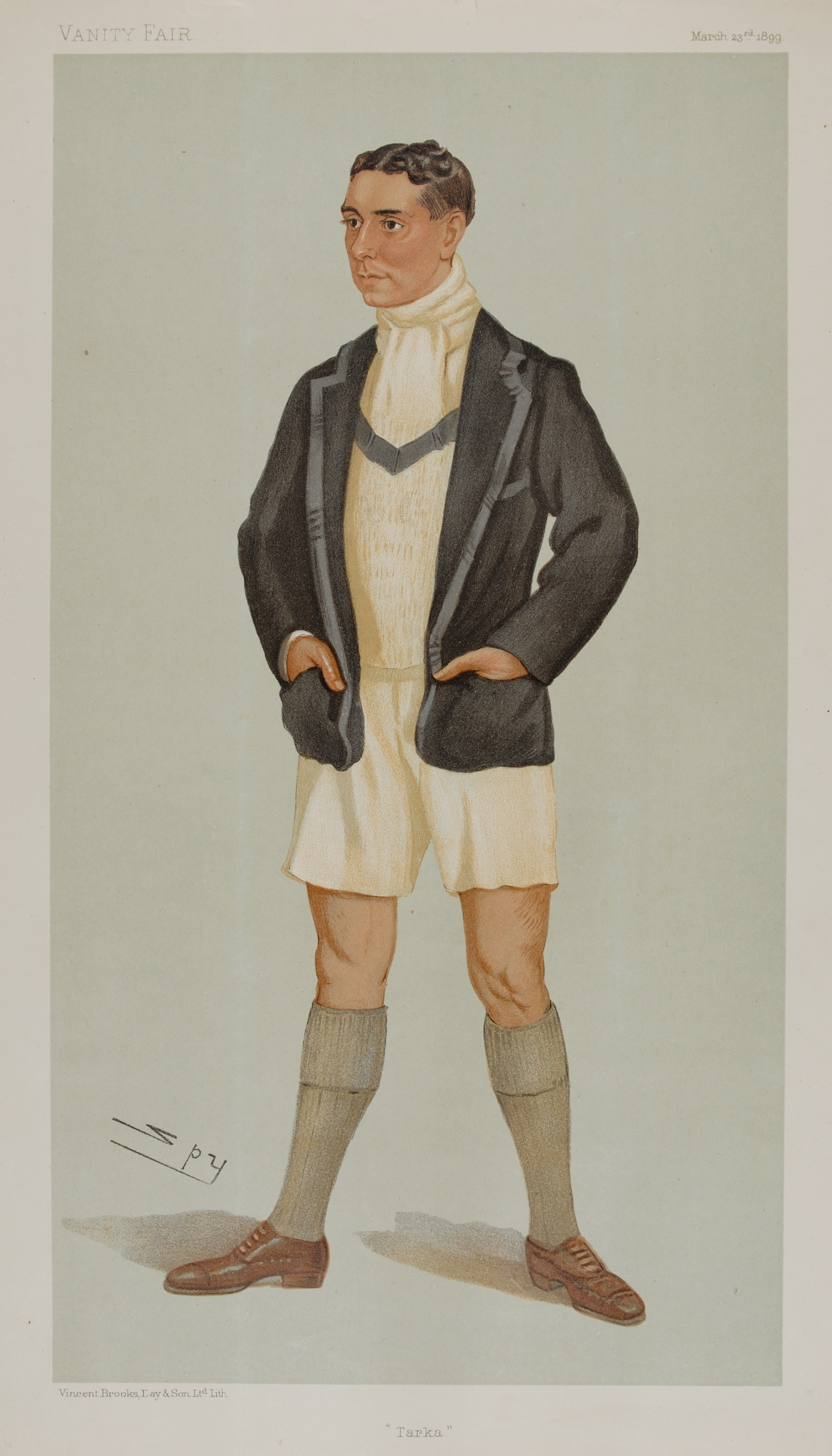
Harcourt Gilbey Gold, former Oxford University Boat Club president coached the Oxford crew.

The Boat Race is a side-by-side rowing competition between the University of Oxford (sometimes referred to as the "Dark Blues") and the University of Cambridge (sometimes referred to as the "Light Blues"). The race was first held in 1829, and since 1845 has taken place on the 4.2-mile (6.8 km) Championship Course on the River Thames in southwest London. The rivalry is a major point of honour between the two universities; it is followed throughout the United Kingdom and, as of 2014, broadcast worldwide. Oxford went into the race as reigning champions, having won the 1912 race by six lengths, and led overall with 38 victories to Cambridge's 30 (excluding the "dead heat" of 1877).

Oxford's coaches were H. R. Barker (who rowed for the Dark Blues in the 1908 and 1909 races), G. C. Bourne who had rowed for the university in the 1882 and 1883 races, Harcourt Gilbey Gold (Dark Blue president for the 1900 race and four-time Blue), and Alister Kirby (who rowed for Cambridge four times between 1906 and 1909). Cambridge were coached by John Houghton Gibbon who rowed for the Light Blues in the 1899 and 1900 races. For the tenth year the umpire was old Etonian Frederick I. Pitman who rowed for Cambridge in the 1884, 1885 and 1886 races.

To avoid Holy Week, the race was scheduled earlier than normal, on 13 March 1913. Two old Etonians, G. E. Tower and C. E. V. Buxton joined the Cambridge crew, along with W. M. Askwith. The Light Blues' practice was disrupted, first losing Askwith suffering from a boil, and then, late in the build-up the race, losing both E. L. Showell Rogers and L. A. Pattinson to injury and "indigestion" respectively nine days before the race. Askwith was fit enough to return and according to author and former Oxford rower George Drinkwater, "the crew were well together when they came to the post". Of the Oxford crew, Drinkwater noted that "the crew went easily and comfortably from the first day" yet "lacked essential balance".

== Crews ==
The Oxford crew weighed an average of 12 st 6.375 lb (78.9 kg), 1.875 pounds (0.9 kg) per rower more than their opponents. Cambridge's crew included two rowers with Boat Race experience in Sidney Swann and Ralph Shove, the former making his third appearance in the event. The Oxford crew saw five participants return, including Leslie Wormald and cox Henry Wells who were both taking part in their third race. Edgar Burgess, Swann, Wormald and Ewart Horsfall had all won gold medals in the men's eight at the 1912 Summer Olympics, rowing for Leander Club. They defeated New College in the final for whom Dark Blue Arthur Wiggins rowed.

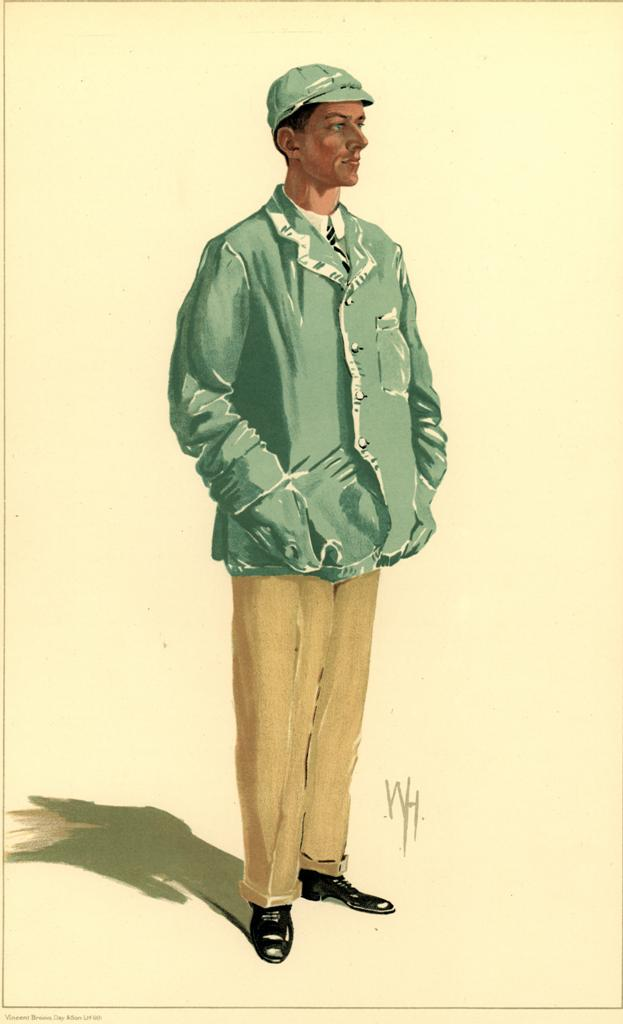
Sidney Swann rowed at number two for Cambridge.

| Seat | Oxford | | | Cambridge | | |
| Seat | Name | College | Weight | Name | College | Weight |
|---|---|---|---|---|---|---|
| Bow | E. R. Burgess | Magdalen | 11 st 6 lb | G. A. Fisher | Jesus | 11 st 2 lb |
| 2 | C. L. Bailieu | Magdalen | 12 st 4 lb | S. E. Swann | Trinity Hall | 11 st 9.5 lb |
| 3 | R. P. Hankinson | New College | 11 st 13 lb | H. Roper | Sidney Sussex | 12 st 10.5 lb |
| 4 | H. K. Ward | New College | 12 st 6 lb | W. M. Askwith | Corpus Christi | 13 st 10 lb |
| 5 | A. H. M. Wedderburn | Balliol | 13 st 10 lb | C. S. Clark | Pembroke | 12 st 13 lb |
| 6 | A. F. R. Wiggins | New College | 12 st 12 lb | R. S. Shove | 1st Trinity | 12 st 8lb |
| 7 | L. G. Wormald (P) | Magdalen | 12 st 8 lb | C. E. V. Buxton | 3rd Trinity | 12 st 0 lb |
| Stroke | E. D. Horsfall | Magdalen | 12 st 6 lb | G. E. Tower | 3rd Trinity | 11 st 11.25 lb |
| Cox | H. B. Wells | Magdalen | 8 st 8 lb | L. E. Ridley | Jesus | 8 st 6 lb |
Source: (P) – boat club president C. R. le Blanc Smith acted as Cambridge's non-rowing president.

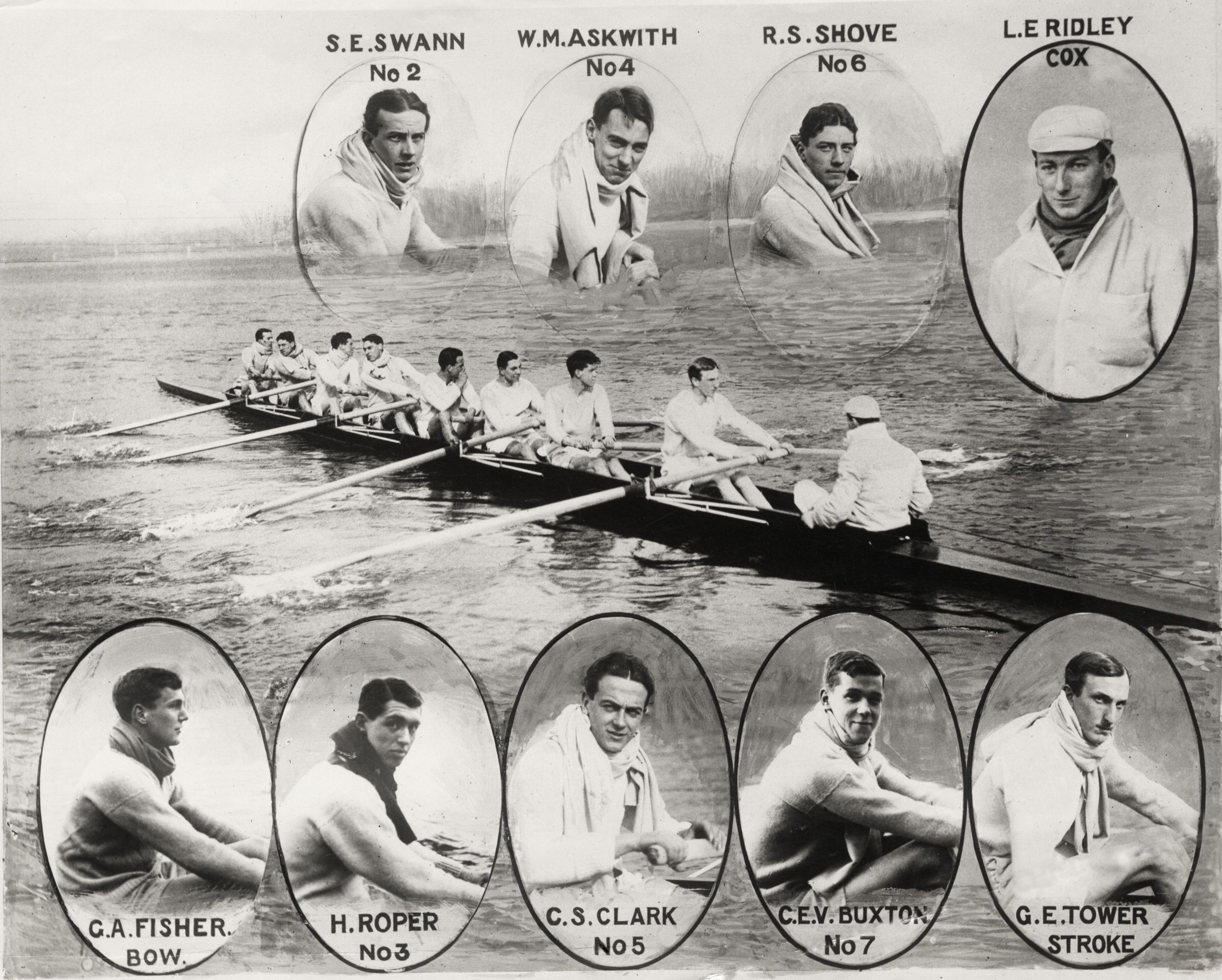
Cambridge crew

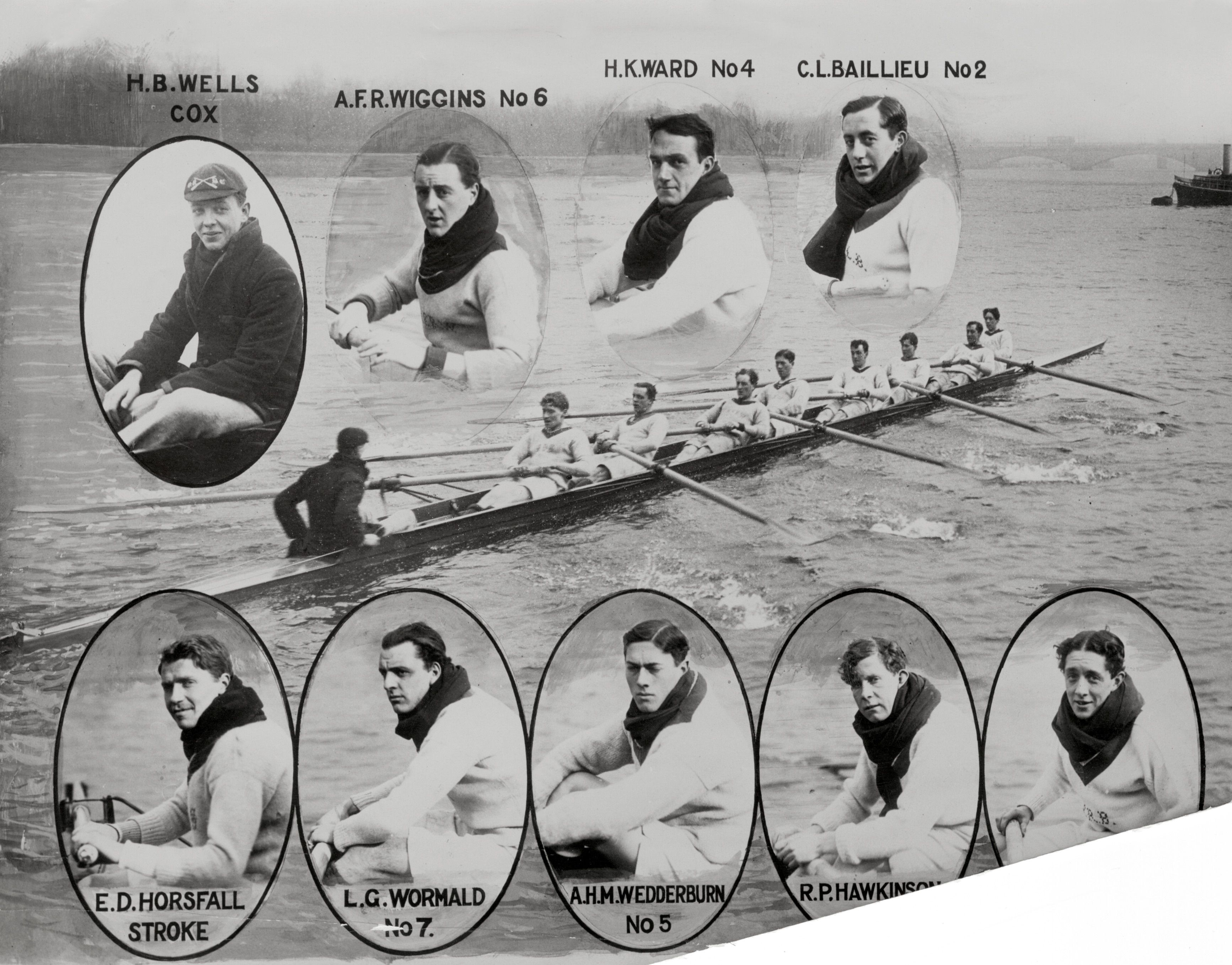
Oxford crew

== Race ==
The Championship Course along which the Boat Race is contested

Cambridge won the toss and elected to start from the Surrey station, handing the Middlesex side of the river to Oxford. Umpire Pitman started the race at 4:38 p.m. in conditions described by former author and former Oxford rower George Drinkwater as "almost perfect" but with a "modest" tide. Despite Oxford out-rating their opponents from the start, Cambridge took an early lead and were half a length ahead after the first minute. Although the bend in the river was against them, the Light Blues continued to slowly gain and were just clear by the Mile Post. A spurt from Oxford closed the gap and by Harrods Furniture Depository the lead was down to half a length. Taking advantage of the bend in the river, the Light Blues pulled away again and were nearly clear by the time the crews passed below Hammersmith Bridge. They extended the lead to be a quarter-length clear by The Doves pub, and then a half-length clear by Craven Steps.

Rowing into increasing wind, Cambridge began to tire and Oxford closed the gap. The Cambridge stroke G. E. Tower spurted again just before Barnes Bridge and led by a length and a quarter at the bridge. The crews began to steer closer to one another, eventually causing each cox to give way to avoid the foul. By the time the boats passed Mortlake Brewery they were level, and despite a final push from Cambridge, Oxford drove on, passing the finishing post rating 37 strokes per minute. They won by three-quarters of a length in a time of 20 minutes 53 seconds. It was the narrowest winning margin since the 1896 race, and Oxford's fifth consecutive victory, taking the overall record in the event to 39–30 in their favour.
