= Robin Johnston =

Robin Johnston(e) may refer to:

- Robin Knox-Johnston, English sailor
- Robin Johnstone, British rower
- Robin Johnstone (figure skater)

== See also ==
- Robin Johnson (disambiguation)
