= Linacre Boat Club =

British rowing club

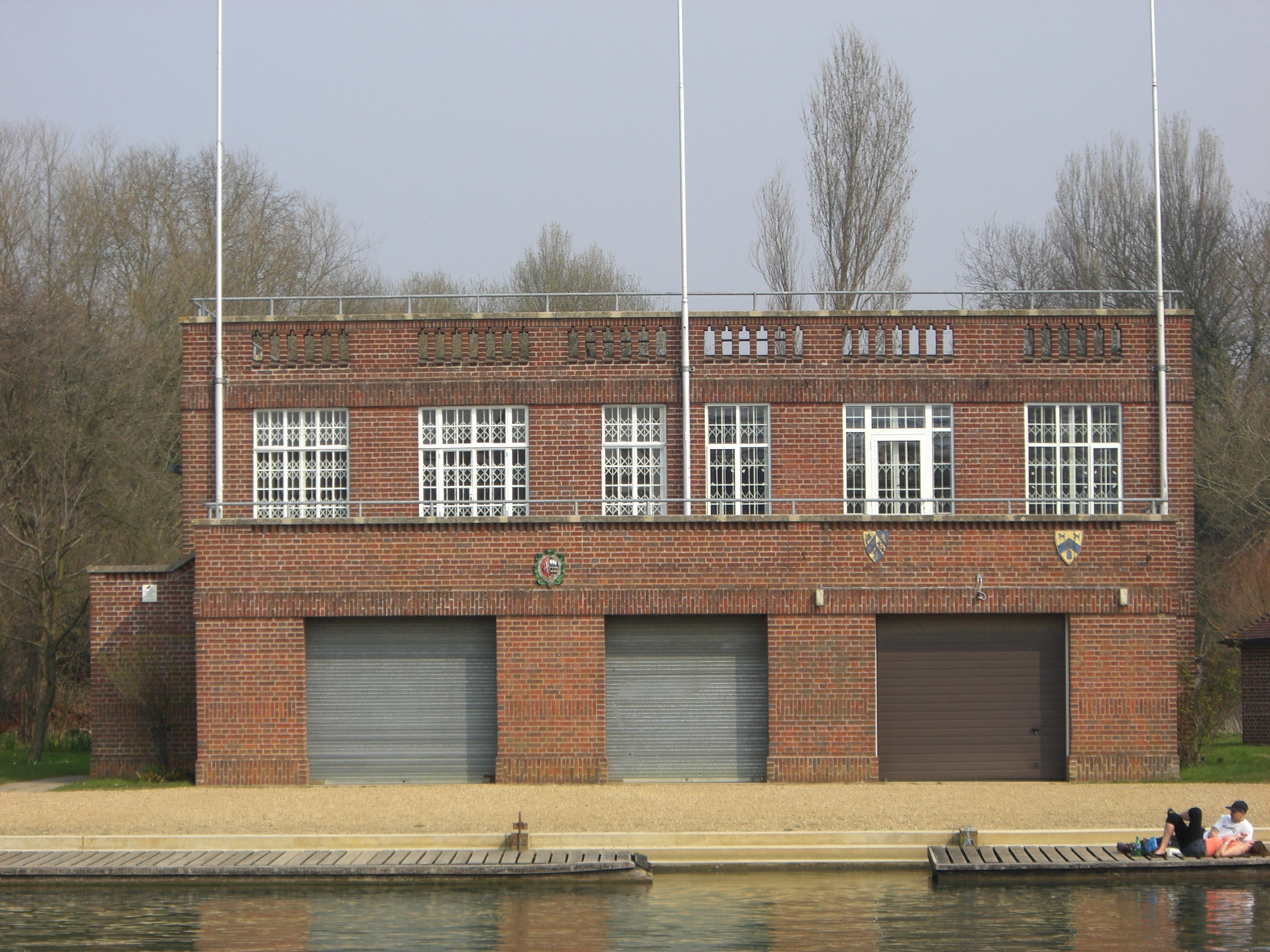

- Boathouse (building shared with Magdalen, LMH & Trinity)
- Location: Boathouse Island, Christ Church Meadow, Oxford, Oxford
- Coordinates: 51.742756°N 1.248819°W
- Home water: River Isis
- Founded: 1968
- University: University of Oxford
- Affiliations: British Rowing (boat code LIN)
- Website: linacreboat.club

Linacre Boat Club (LBC) is a rowing club for members of Linacre and Nuffield colleges in the University of Oxford. Founded in 1968, the club rows on the River Isis and shares a boathouse with the college boat clubs of Magdalen, Lady Margaret Hall and Trinity.

Linacre Boat Club is affiliated to British Rowing and, since 2022, has organised the Tamesis Regatta, a series of side-by-side races held over four days for novice crews.

== History ==
The club was founded in 1968 and, as both Linacre and Nuffield are graduate colleges, is one of the few rowing clubs on the Isis that caters solely to postgraduate students.

Linacre competes in a wide variety of races, both on the Isis (including the Torpids and Summer Eights) and elsewhere, including the Head of the River Race on the Thames at London.

From time-to-time the club uses the scallop shells of Linacre college, which are themselves taken from the arms of the prominent Linacre family of northern Derbyshire and southern Yorkshire, and represent the completion of the Camino pilgrimage to Santiago. The colours of the blades likely originate in the golden (or) crowns of the old (pre-1988) arms of Linacre college and its black (sable) shield.

Between the college's foundation and the creation of its boat club in 2023, members of Reuben College also rowed with LBC. They have since incorporated to form Reuben Boat Club.

In 1994 Snorre Lorgen of Nuffield College was the club's first representative in the men's Boat Race.

In 2019 Lizzie Polgreen was the club's first representative in the women's Boat Race.

== Honours ==
=== Boat Race representatives ===
The following rowers were part of the rowing club at the time of their participation in The Boat Race.

Men's boat race

Year	Name
1994	Snorre Lorgen ^
2000	Eirik B. Lilledahl ^
2001	Eirik B. Lilledahl ^
2001	Brian T. Palm
2006	Jake Wetzel
2017	Vassilis Ragoussis
2018	Vassilis Ragoussis

Women's boat race

Year	Name
2019	Lizzie Polgreen
2019	Eleanor Shearer + ^
2026	Sarah Marshall ^

Key

- + = Coxswain
- ^ = Represented Nuffield College

== See also ==
- University rowing (UK)
- Oxford University Boat Club
- Rowing on the River Thames
