= Jiří Kallmünzer =

Czechoslovak rower

Personal information
- Nationality: Czech
- Born: 4 December 1896

Sport
- Sport: Rowing

Jiří Kallmünzer (born 4 December 1896, date of death unknown) was a Czechoslovak rower. He competed in the men's eight event at the 1920 Summer Olympics.
