= Albert Diebold =

French rower (1895–1955)

Personal information
- Nationality: French
- Born: 7 December 1895 Strasbourg, France
- Died: 7 November 1955 (aged 59) Strasbourg, France

Sport
- Sport: Rowing

Albert Diebold (7 December 1895 – 7 November 1955) was a French rower. He competed in the men's eight event at the 1920 Summer Olympics.
