= Frédéric Fleig =

French rower

Personal information
- Nationality: French
- Born: 25 December 1890
- Died: 20 September 1973 (aged 82)
- Relatives: Robert Fleig (brother)

Sport
- Sport: Rowing

Frédéric Fleig (25 December 1890 – 20 September 1973) was a French rower. He competed in the men's eight event at the 1920 Summer Olympics.
