= Josef Širc =

Czechoslovak rower

Personal information
- Nationality: Czech
- Born: 15 July 1896
- Died: 4 November 1970 (aged 74)

Sport
- Sport: Rowing

Josef Širc (15 July 1896 – 4 November 1970) was a Czechoslovak rower. He competed in the men's eight event at the 1920 Summer Olympics.
