= Bohdan Kallmünzer =

Czechoslovak rower

Personal information
- Nationality: Czech

Sport
- Sport: Rowing

Bohdan Kallmünzer was a Czechoslovak rower. He competed in the men's eight event at the 1920 Summer Olympics.
