= Vladimír Širc =

Czechoslovak rower

Personal information
- Nationality: Czech
- Born: 26 May 1901 Mělník
- Died: 1951 (aged 49–50)

Sport
- Sport: Rowing

Vladimír Širc (26 May 1901 – 1951) was a Czechoslovak rower. He competed in the men's eight event at the 1920 Summer Olympics.
