= Robin Johnson (disambiguation) =

Robin Johnson is an actress.

Robin or Robyn Johnson may also refer to:

- Robin Johnson (singer)
- Robin Johnson (1929–1989) of the Johnson Baronets
- Robyn Johnson (field hockey), South African field hockey player
- Robyn Johnson (Miss Wyoming USA), beauty queen

== See also ==
- Robin Johnston (disambiguation)
