= The Boat Race 1912 =

69th Boat Race
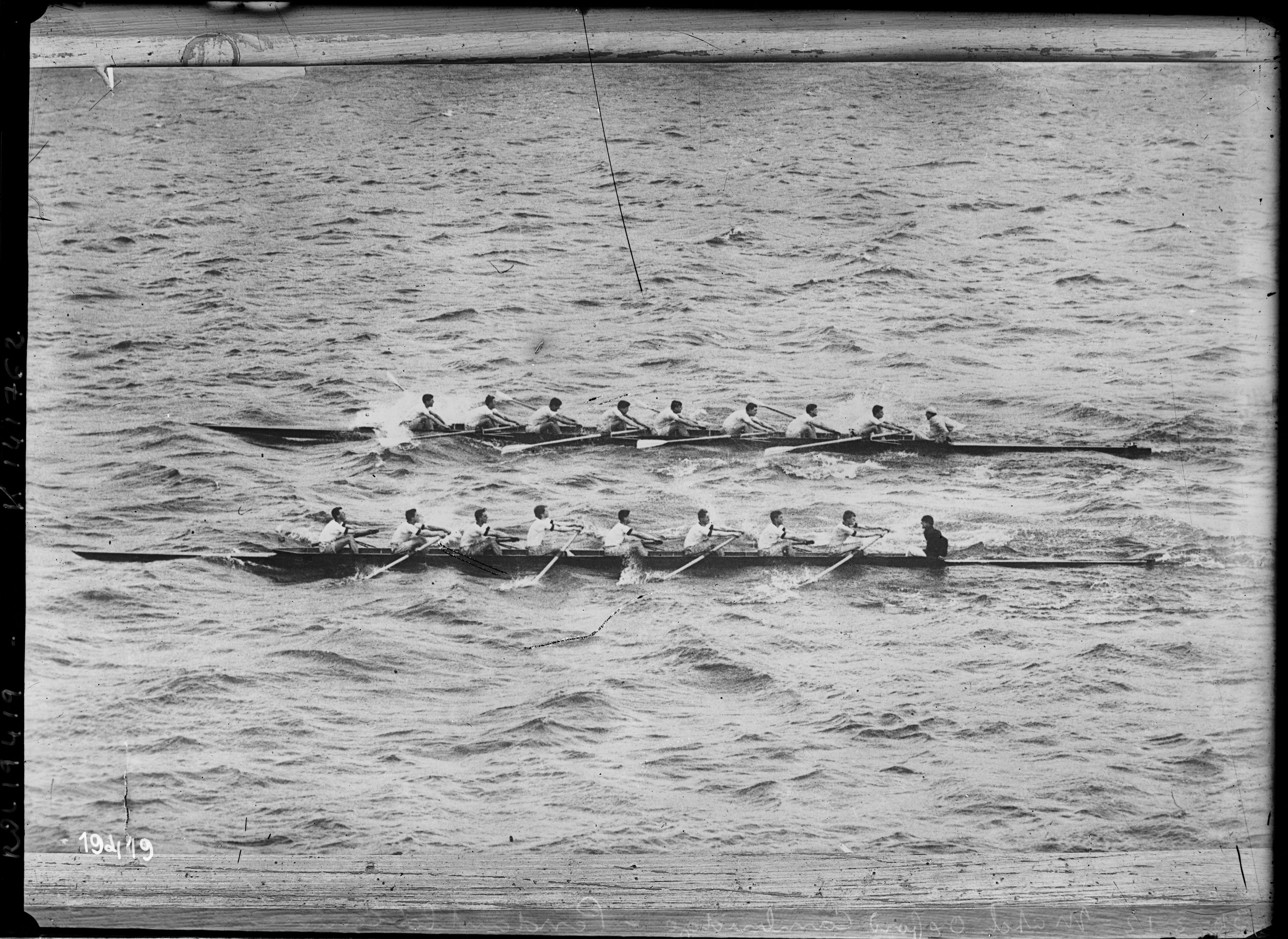
- Date: 30 March 1912 & 1 April 1912
- Winner: Oxford
- Margin of victory: 6 lengths
- Winning time: 22 minutes 5 seconds
- Overall record (Cambridge–Oxford): 30–38
- Umpire: Frederick I. Pitman (Cambridge)

The 69th Boat Race was a side-by-side rowing race between crews from the Universities of Oxford and Cambridge along the River Thames which took place on 30 March 1912, with a re-row on 1 April 1912. The event is held annually between the universities. Oxford went into the race as reigning champions, having won The Boat Race 1911. Umpired by former Cambridge rower Frederick I. Pitman, the first running of the race ended with Cambridge sinking and Oxford waterlogged. Pitman declared the result as "No Race", and in the subsequent re-row the following Monday, the race was won by Oxford by six lengths. Oxford's fourth consecutive victory made the overall record in the event 38–30 in their favour (the 34th edition, The Boat Race 1877, had ended in a dead heat and so was not counted towards either team's total).

== Background ==
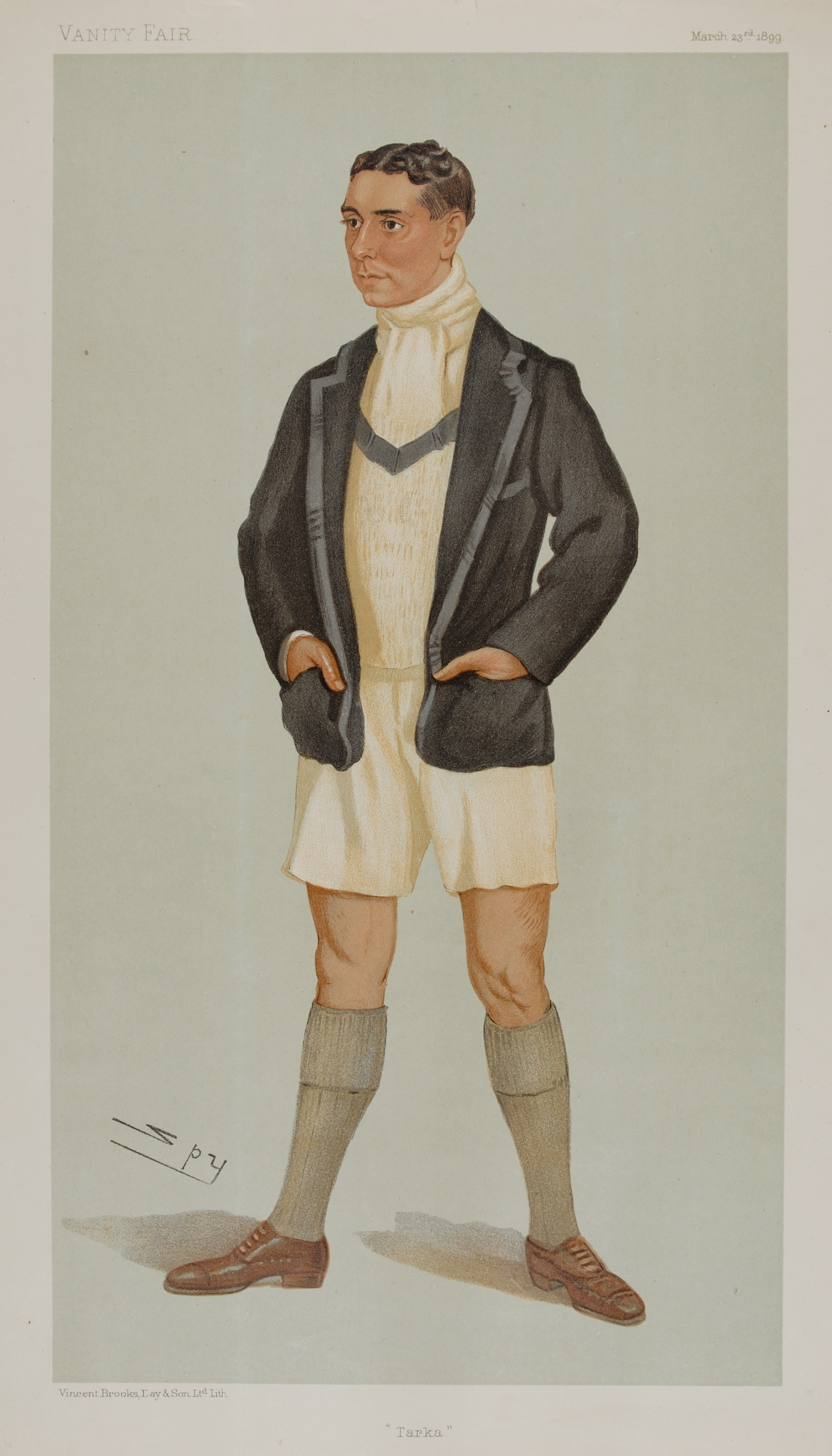
Harcourt Gilbey Gold, former Oxford University Boat Club president coached the Oxford crew.

The Boat Race is a side-by-side rowing competition between the University of Oxford (sometimes referred to as the "Dark Blues") and the University of Cambridge (sometimes referred to as the "Light Blues"). The race was first held in 1829, and since 1845 has taken place on the 4.2-mile (6.8 km) Championship Course on the River Thames in southwest London. The rivalry is a major point of honour between the two universities; it is followed throughout the United Kingdom and, as of 2014, broadcast worldwide. Oxford went into the race as reigning champions, having won the previous year's race by 3 3/4 lengths. Oxford, however, held the overall lead with 37 victories to Cambridge's 30 (excluding the "dead heat" of 1877).

Oxford's coaches were G. C. Bourne who had rowed for the university in the 1882 and 1883 races, Harcourt Gilbey Gold (Dark Blue president for the 1900 race and four-time Blue), and W. F. C. Holland who had rowed for Oxford four times between 1887 and 1890. Cambridge were coached by John Houghton Gibbon who rowed for the Light Blues in the 1899 and 1900 races. For the ninth year the umpire was old Etonian Frederick I. Pitman who rowed for Cambridge in the 1884, 1885 and 1886 races.

Author and former Oxford rower George Drinkwater noted that the Dark Blue crew was "by no means so quick in the water, but they possessed greater ease of movement". Despite being struck by influenza, the training was never really hampered. Conversely, Cambridge suffered "misfortune after misfortune". They persisted with D. C. Collins at stroke "in spite of his inexperience" but he was replaced by Sidney Swann. F. E. Hellyer was selected to row at number seven yet was forced to depart, suffering from influenza; his replacement in L. S. Lloyd was considered "far too light". C. F. Burnand was also forced to leave the crew through illness. Despite this, upon arrival at Putney, the Light Blues "made astonishing improvement", and it was "only on account of their weight" that Oxford went into the race as favourites.

== Crews ==
The Oxford crew weighed an average of 12 st 5.875 lb (78.7 kg), 7.625 pounds (3.5 kg) per rower more than their opponents. Cambridge saw five competitors return to the boat, including R. W. M. Arbuthnot at stroke, rowing in his fourth consecutive race. Oxford's crew also contained five participants with Boat Race experience, including Robert Bourne who was making his fourth appearance in the event. Seven of the Oxford crew were educated at Eton College. Three participants in the race were registered as non-British: Oxford's Charles Littlejohn was Australian while Cambridge's cox C. A. Skinner hailed from South Africa and their number two D. C. Collins came from New Zealand.

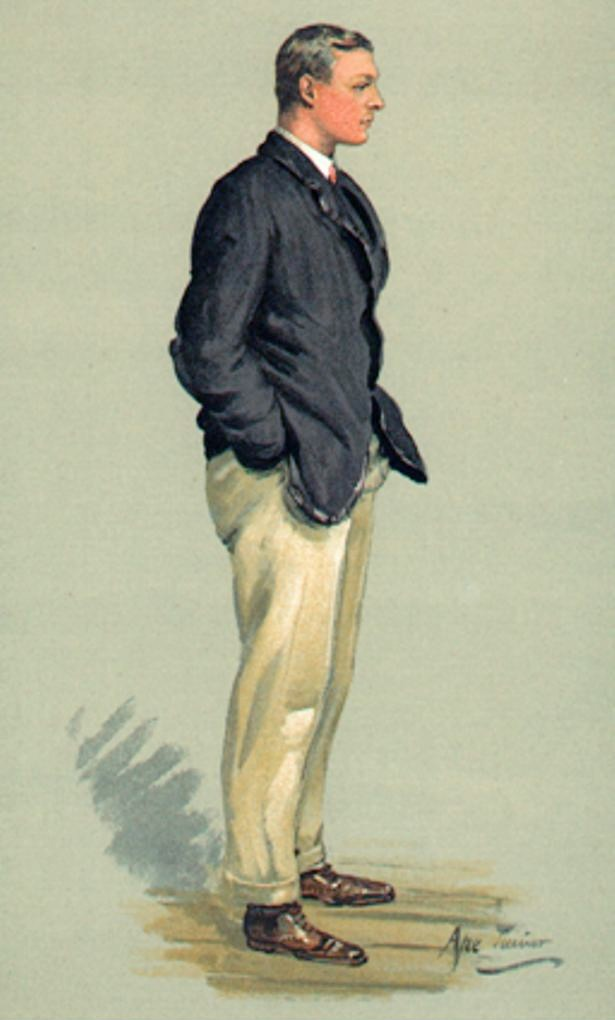
Robert Bourne was the Oxford University Boat Club president and stroke in 1912.

Seat	Oxford			Cambridge		
Seat	Name	College	Weight	Name	College	Weight
Bow	F. A. H. Pitman	New College	11 st 11.5 lb	R. W. M. Arbuthnot (P)	3rd Trinity	10 st 9 lb
2	C. E. Tinné	University	12 st 4 lb	D. C. Collins	1st Trinity	11 st 7.75 lb
3	L. G. Wormald	Magdalen	12 st 9 lb	H. M. Heyland	Pembroke	12 st 4.25 lb
4	E. D. Horsfall	Magdalen	12 st 6 lb	R. S. Shove	1st Trinity	12 st 6.5 lb
5	A. H. M. Wedderburn	Balliol	13 st 11 lb	J. H. Goldsmith	Jesus	12 st 13.5 lb
6	A. F. R. Wiggins	New College	12 st 11 lb	C. R. le Blanc Smith	3rd Trinity	13 st 3 lb
7	C. W. B. Littlejohn	New College	12 st 8 lb	L. S. Lloyd	3rd Trinity	10 st 5.5 lb
Stroke	R. C. Bourne (P)	New College	11 st 0.5 lb	S. E. Swann	Trinity Hall	11 st 6 lb
Cox	H. Bensley Wells	Magdalen	8 st 7 lb	C. A. Skinner	Jesus	8 st 3 lb
Source: (P) – boat club president

== Race ==
The Championship Course along which the Boat Race is contested

Oxford won the toss and elected to start from the Surrey station, handing the Middlesex side of the river to Cambridge. In very rough conditions, Pitman started the race at 11:43 a.m., with both coxes initially steering their crews away from each other. The Light Blues started better before Oxford passed them to lead after the first minute, their cox Henry Bensley Wells opposite the Cambridge stroke Swann. By the end of Fulham wall, the Dark Blues were clear of Cambridge but both crews had taken on board a large volume of water. Bensley-Wells steered his boat close to the shore for shelter, moving out only to pass below the centre arch of Hammersmith Bridge before heading back towards the shore once again. Following discussion with his stroke Robert Bourne, Bensley-Wells steered into the shore whereupon the crew disembarked to empty their vessel of the river water. After getting back onto the river, the Oxford boat was approached by the umpire's launch and informed by Pitman that Cambridge had sunk off Harrods Furniture Depository and that he was declaring "No Race". Despite this, Oxford finished the course and paddled to Mortlake. Prior to this year's event, there had been one sinking in the history of the race: Cambridge sank in the 1859 race. Author Gordon Ross described the aborted race as "a fiasco of some magnitude", while Drinkwater called it "the greatest fiasco in the history of the race." With the agreement of the Port of London Authority, it was agreed to hold a re-row the following Monday.

According to Bensley-Wells "the weather on the Monday was again bad ... the wind was even stronger but ... had changed direction slightly." Oxford again won the toss and elected to start from the Middlesex station, handing the Surrey side of the river to Cambridge. Pitman got the race under way at 12:40 p.m. The Dark Blues made a better start and took advantage of the shelter once again provided by the Middlesex side of the river. Although out-rating the Dark Blues by up to six strokes per second, Cambridge could not overhaul the deficit and when Oxford passed the Crab Tree pub, Bensley-Wells made for "the shortest way home" and steered over towards the Surrey station in water that "looked to be fairly good." Oxford passed the finishing post with a lead of six lengths in a time of 22 minutes 5 seconds. It was the largest winning margin since the 1903 race and the slowest winning time since the 1901 race. The victory took the overall record in the event to 38–30 in Oxford's favour.
