= Charles Schlewer =

French rower (1901–1986)

Personal information
- Born: Karl Schlewer; 15 March 1901 Strasbourg, France
- Died: 27 November 1986 (aged 85) Strasbourg, France

Sport
- Sport: Rowing
- Club: Cercle de l'Aviron de Strasbourg
Medal record
Men's rowing
Representing France
European Rowing Championships
Gold medal – first place	1922 Barcelona	Coxed four

Karl Schlewer (15 March 1901 – 27 November 1986), known as Charles Schlewer, was a French rower. He competed at the 1920 Summer Olympics in Antwerp with the men's eight where they were eliminated in the semi-finals.
