= Karel Čížek =

Czechoslovak rowing coxswain

Personal information
- Nationality: Czech
- Born: 3 February 1892; Roudnice nad Labem
- Died: 31 August 1948 (aged 56); Ústí nad Labem

Sport
- Sport: Rowing

Karel Čížek (3 February 1892 – 31 August 1948) was a Czechoslovak rowing coxswain. He competed in the men's eight event at the 1920 Summer Olympics.
