= Frédéric Grossmann =

French rower

Personal information
- Nationality: French
- Born: 20 September 1895 Strasbourg, France
- Died: 19 December 1979 (aged 84) Dortmund, Germany

Sport
- Sport: Rowing

Frédéric Grossmann (20 September 1895 – 19 December 1979) was a French rower. He competed in the men's eight event at the 1920 Summer Olympics.
