= Robert Fleig =

French rower (1893–1944)

Personal information
- Full name: Adolf Wilhelm Robert Fleig
- Nationality: French
- Born: 28 June 1893; Strasbourg, Bas-Rhin, France
- Died: 23 November 1944 (aged 51); Strasbourg, Bas-Rhin, France
- Relatives: Frédéric Fleig (brother)

Sport
- Sport: Rowing

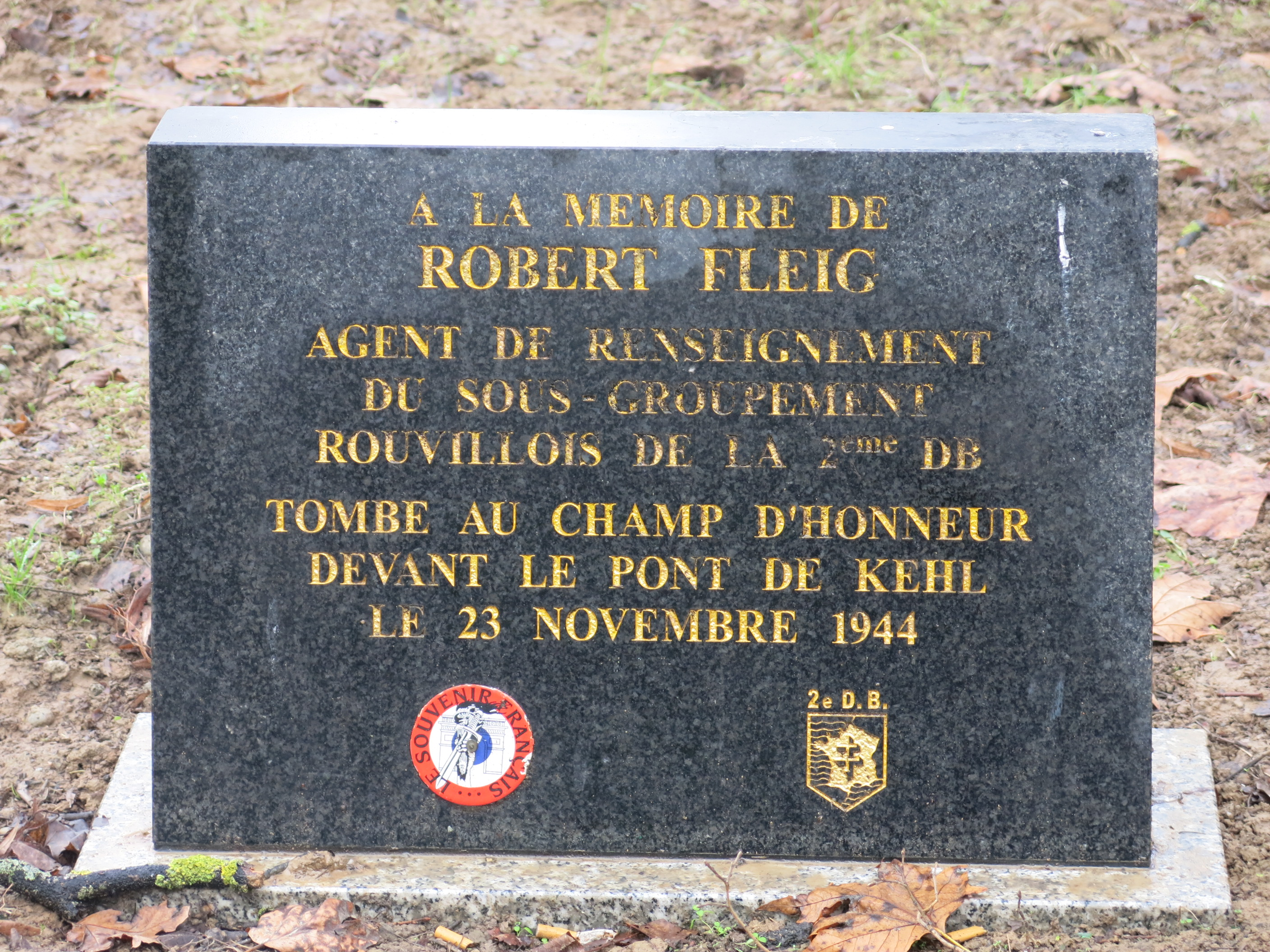
Plaque in memory to Robert Fleig near the Sherman tank Cherbourg in the district of the port du Rhin in Strasbourg

Adolf Wilhelm Robert Fleig (28 June 1893 – 23 November 1944) was a French rower. He competed in the men's eight event at the 1920 Summer Olympics. He was killed in action during World War II.
