= Adolf Nilsen =

Norwegian-American rower (1895–1983)

Olympic medal record

Men's rowing
Bronze medal – third place	1920 Antwerp	Eight

Adolf Nilsen (3 March 1895 – October 1983) was a Norwegian-American rower who competed in the 1920 Summer Olympics.

Adolf Gustinius Nilsen was born in Stavanger, Norway. He was affiliated with the Stavanger Roklub, in Stavanger. In 1920 he won the bronze medal as crew member of the Norwegian boat in the eight competition. Nilsen was a rower on that Norwegian boat, which won the bronze medal behind the US and the UK.

He died in 1983 in Westminster, Colorado.
