= Piet Plantinga =

Dutch water polo player (1896–1944)

Personal information
- Full name: Piet Hein Plantinga
- Nationality: Netherlands
- Born: 29 June 1896 Amsterdam, the Netherlands
- Died: 7 October 1944 (aged 48) Amsterdam, the Netherlands

Sport
- Sport: Water polo

Senior clubs
- Years: Team
- –: DJK-ZAR, Amsterdam
National team
- Years: Team
- ?-?: Netherlands

Piet Hein Plantinga (29 June 1896 – 7 October 1944) was a Dutch male water polo player. He was a member of the Netherlands men's national water polo team. He competed with the team at the 1920 Summer Olympics.
