= Richard Lucas (rower) =

British rower

Olympic medal record

Men's rowing
Silver medal – second place	1920 Antwerp	Eight

Richard Saville Clement Lucas (27 July 1896 – 29 May 1968) was a British rower who competed in the 1920 Summer Olympics.

== Biography ==
Lucas was born at St. Marylebone, London, and served in the Royal Artillery during World War I, being a 2nd lieutenant in 1915. After the war, he went to Oxford University and was a proficient rower. He was a member of the Leander eight which won the silver medal for Great Britain rowing at the 1920 Summer Olympics, coming within half a length of winning.

In 1921, he was a member of the Oxford crew in the Boat Race. He was also five times a member of the winning crew in the Grand Challenge Cup at Henley Royal Regatta.

Lucas and his wife, Rene, spent their later years rescuing abandoned boats. In 1947, they rescued the yacht Lulworth which they mud-berthed and used it as a houseboat. Lucas died of a heart attack while sailing his dinghy.

== See also ==
- List of Oxford University Boat Race crews
