= Piet van der Velden =

Dutch water polo player (1899–1975)

Personal information
- Full name: Pieter van der Velden
- Nationality: Netherlands
- Born: 5 September 1899 Amsterdam, the Netherlands
- Died: 2 April 1975 (aged 75) Amsterdam, the Netherlands

Sport
- Sport: Water polo

Senior clubs
- Years: Team
- –: De Dolfijn, Amsterdam
National team
- Years: Team
- ?-?: Netherlands

Pieter "Piet" van der Velden (5 September 1899 – 2 April 1975) was a Dutch male water polo player. He was a member of the Netherlands men's national water polo team. He was a part of the team at the 1920 Summer Olympics.
