= Willem Hudig =

Dutch rower

Personal information
- Full name: Willem Hugo Hudig
- Nationality: Dutch
- Born: 30 May 1894; Rotterdam, Netherlands
- Died: 1 July 1970 (aged 76); Rotterdam, Netherlands

Sport
- Sport: Rowing

Willem Hugo Hudig (30 May 1894 – 1 July 1970) was a Dutch rower. He competed in the men's eight event at the 1920 Summer Olympics.
