= Rie Beisenherz =

Dutch swimmer

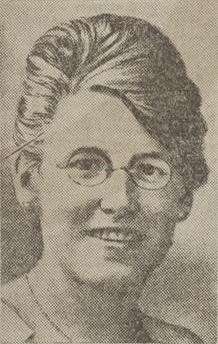
- Beisenherz in 1920

Personal information
- Born: 8 September 1901 Amsterdam, Netherlands
- Died: 12 April 1992 (aged 90) Bussum, Netherlands

Sport
- Sport: Swimming

Rie Beisenherz (8 September 1901 – 12 April 1992) was a Dutch swimmer. She competed in the women's 100 metre freestyle event at the 1920 Summer Olympics, reaching the semifinals. She was the first woman to represent the Netherlands at the Olympics.
