= Johannes van der Vegte =

Dutch rower

Personal information
- Born: Johannes Albertinus van der Vegte; 16 December 1892 Gendringen, Netherlands
- Died: 15 March 1945 (aged 52) Medan, Dutch East Indies

Sport
- Sport: Rowing
- Club: Laga, Delft
Medal record
Men's rowing
Representing the Netherlands
European Rowing Championships
Bronze medal – third place	1921 Amsterdam	Coxed pair
Silver medal – second place	1925 Prague	Coxless pair

Johannes Albertinus van der Vegte (16 December 1892 – 15 March 1945) was a Dutch rower. He competed at the 1920 Summer Olympics in Antwerp with the men's eight where they were eliminated in round one. During WWII, he was a prisoner of war and died in the Japanese camp Soengei Sengkol in Medan, Indonesia on 15 March 1945.
