= Johannes Haasnoot =

Dutch rower

Personal information
- Nationality: Dutch
- Born: 25 January 1897; Maassluis, Netherlands
- Died: 5 August 1987 (aged 90); Rotterdam, Netherlands

Sport
- Sport: Rowing

Johannes Haasnoot (25 January 1897 – 5 August 1987) was a Dutch rower. He competed in the men's eight event at the 1920 Summer Olympics.
