= Émile Ruhlmann (rower) =

French rower

Personal information
- Full name: Émile Daniel Ruhlmann
- Nationality: French
- Born: 24 January 1897; Strasbourg, France
- Died: 28 January 1975 (aged 78); Brumath, France

Sport
- Sport: Rowing

Émile Daniel Ruhlmann (24 January 1897 – 28 January 1975) was a French rower. He competed in the men's eight event at the 1920 Summer Olympics.
