= Arne Mortensen =

Norwegian rower

Olympic medal record

Men's rowing
Bronze medal – third place	1920 Antwerp	Eight

Arne Mortensen (14 October 1900 – 28 February 1942) was a Norwegian rower who competed in the 1920 Summer Olympics.

In 1920 he won the bronze medal as crew member of the Norwegian boat in the men's eight competition.
