= Thoralf Hagen =

Norwegian coxswain

Olympic medal record

Men's rowing
Bronze medal – third place	1920 Antwerp	Coxed four
Bronze medal – third place	1920 Antwerp	Eight

Thoralf Hagen (22 September 1887 – 7 January 1979) was a Norwegian rowing coxswain who competed in the 1920 Summer Olympics.

In 1920 he won the bronze medal as coxswain of the Norwegian boat in the coxed four competition as well as in the eight.
