= Robbert Blaisse =

Dutch rower

Personal information
- Full name: Robbert Stephan Blaisse
- Nationality: Dutch
- Born: 12 July 1900; Amsterdam, Netherlands
- Died: 21 March 1959 (aged 58); Maarn, Netherlands

Sport
- Sport: Rowing

Robbert Stephan Blaisse (12 July 1900 – 21 March 1959) was a Dutch rower. He competed in the men's eight event at the 1920 Summer Olympics.
