= Tollef Tollefsen =

Norwegian rower

Olympic medal record

Men's rowing
Bronze medal – third place	1920 Antwerp	Eight

Tollef Tollefsen (2 June 1885 – 28 March 1963) was a Norwegian rower who competed in the 1920 Summer Olympics.

In 1920 he won the bronze medal as crew member of the Norwegian boat in the men's eight competition.
