= Alden Sanborn =

American rower

Alden "Zeke" Sanborn
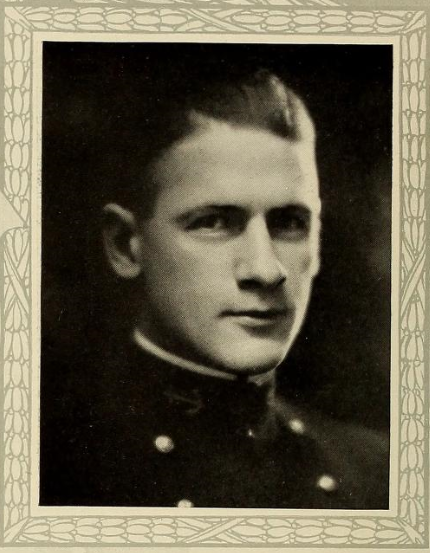
- Sanborn as a midshipman, ca. 1922

Personal information
- Full name: Alden Ream Sanborn
- Born: May 22, 1899 Jefferson, Wisconsin, U.S.
- Died: December 1, 1991 (aged 92) Charlotte Hall, Maryland, U.S.
Medal record
Men's rowing
Representing the United States
Olympic Games
Gold medal – first place	1920 Antwerp	Eight

Alden Ream "Zeke" Sanborn (May 22, 1899 – December 1, 1991) was an American rower who competed in the 1920 Summer Olympics in Antwerp. He won a gold medal in men's eight. He also served as a United States Naval Aviator.

== Biography ==
Sanborn was born in Jefferson, Wisconsin, on May 22, 1899, to Edwin J. Sanborn (1865–1941) and Augusta Irene Ream Sanborn (1873–1933). After attending Beloit College, he then entered the United States Naval Academy, where he graduated in 1922 with special honors. At the 1920 Summer Olympics, he was part of the American boat from the academy, which won the gold medal in the eights. At the academy, he received a Marine Engineering degree. He then earned a Masters in Aeronautical Engineering from the Massachusetts Institute of Technology.

After receiving his aviator wings at the Pensacola naval air facility, he supported the development of torpedo planes and dive bombers for the United States Navy. He continued in support of aircraft and aircraft carrier maintenance during and after World War II, until 1951 when he retired from the United States Navy as a captain. After retirement, Sanborn worked for Chance Vought in Dallas and Curtiss-Wright in New Jersey until he retired again in 1963.

On March 23, 1940, Sanborn married Marjorie Stewart (1911–1987). Together they had two sons, Alden Ream Sanborn Jr. and Donald Stewart Sanborn.

Sanborn died on December 1, 1991, in Charlotte Hall, Maryland and was buried alongside his wife in Arlington National Cemetery.
