= Karl Nag =

Norwegian rower (1893–1975)

Olympic medal record

Men's rowing
Bronze medal – third place	1920 Antwerp	Eight

Karl Henriksen Nag (10 November 1893 – 9 August 1975) was a Norwegian rower who competed in the 1920 Summer Olympics.

In 1920 he won a bronze medal in the men's eight competition as a crew member of the Norwegian boat.
