= Håkon Ellingsen =

Norwegian rower (1894–1971)

Olympic medal record

Men's rowing
Bronze medal – third place	1920 Antwerp	Eight

Håkon Jarl Brand Ellingsen (25 November 1894 – 22 October 1971) was a Norwegian rower who competed in the 1920 Summer Olympics.

In 1920 he won the bronze medal as crew member of the Norwegian boat in the men's eight competition.
