= Liong Siang Sie =

Dutch rowing coxswain

Personal information
- Nationality: Dutch
- Born: 9 October 1892; Makassar, Dutch East Indies
- Died: 29 May 1953 (aged 60); The Hague, Netherlands

Sport
- Sport: Rowing

Liong Siang Sie (9 October 1892 – 29 May 1953) was a Dutch rowing coxswain. He competed in the men's eight event at the 1920 Summer Olympics.
