= Bernard te Hennepe =

Dutch rower (1884–1955)

Personal information
- Full name: Bernard Johan Christiaan te Hennepe
- Nationality: Dutch
- Born: 4 October 1884; Winterswijk, Netherlands
- Died: 30 July 1955 (aged 70); The Hague, Netherlands

Sport
- Sport: Rowing

Bernard Johan Christiaan te Hennepe (4 October 1884 – 30 July 1955) was a Dutch rower. He competed in the men's eight event at the 1920 Summer Olympics.
