= Richard Edward Eason =

British rower (1902–1978)

- Eason in the 1920 Abingdon School rowing team

Personal information
- Nationality: British (English)
- Born: April 20, 1902 Long Wittenham
- Died: 25 September 1978 (aged 76)

Sport
- Sport: Rowing
- Club: Oxford University Boat Club; Trinity College Boat Club

Richard Edward Eason also known as Dick Eason and Jo Eason (1902-1978) was a British rower.

== Early life and education ==
Eason was educated at Abingdon School from 1913 until 1920. He was captain and gained full colours for the Abingdon School Boat Club, in addition to gaining colours and playing for the first XI football and cricket teams. His brother Alan Eason died of appendicitis in 1916, whilst serving with the Royal Berkshire Regiment during World War I.

== University and rowing blue ==
After leaving Abingdon in 1920, he gained a Bible Scholarship to All Souls College, Oxford. He initially rowed stroke seat for the University second eight before being promoted to the first eight. He won the Silver Goblets Challenge Cup and the Ladies' Challenge Plate at the Henley Royal Regatta in 1923, rowing for Trinity College Boat Club.

In 1924, he took seat 4 in the world-renowned Boat Race, where Oxford lost to Cambridge by 4 1/2 lengths.

== Career ==
He became a teacher at Radley College and coached the Radley rowing VIII, which won the Ladies Plate at Henley Royal Regatta. He was a sub-warden at Radley and remained in close contact with Abingdon School becoming the President of the Old Abingdonian Club in 1962.

== See also ==
- List of Old Abingdonians
