= Vince Gallagher =

American rower (1899–1983)

Olympic medal record

Men's rowing

Representing the United States
Gold medal – first place	1920 Antwerp	Men's eight

Vincent Joseph Gallagher Jr. (April 30, 1899 – June 27, 1983) was an American rower, born in Brooklyn, who competed in the 1920 Summer Olympics.

In 1920, he was part of the American boat from the United States Naval Academy (USNA), which won the gold medal in the men's eight. He graduated from USNA in 1922.
