= Theodor Nag =

Norwegian rower

Olympic medal record

Men's rowing
Bronze medal – third place	1920 Antwerp	Eight

Theodor Henriksen Nag (1 October 1890 – 2 September 1959) was a Norwegian rower who competed in the 1920 Summer Olympics.

In 1920 he won the bronze medal as crew member of the Norwegian boat in the men's eight competition.
