= Philip Jongeneel =

Dutch rower

Personal information
- Full name: Philip Hendrik Jan Jongeneel
- Nationality: Dutch
- Born: 1 July 1893; Rotterdam, Netherlands
- Died: 5 April 1985 (aged 91); The Hague, Netherlands

Sport
- Sport: Rowing

Philip Hendrik Jan Jongeneel (1 July 1893 – 5 April 1985) was a Dutch rower. He competed in the men's eight event at the 1920 Summer Olympics.
