= Clyde King (rower) =

American rear admiral and rower

Personal information
- Born: Clyde Whitlock King; September 6, 1898 Montezuma, Iowa, U.S.
- Died: August 20, 1982 (aged 83) Mill Valley, California, U.S.
- Resting place: Golden Gate National Cemetery
Medal record
Men's rowing
Representing the United States
Olympic Games
Gold medal – first place	1920 Antwerp	Men's eight

Clyde Whitlock King (September 6, 1898 – August 20, 1982) was an American rower who competed in the 1920 Summer Olympics.

King was born in Montezuma, Iowa. In 1920, he was part of the American boat from the United States Naval Academy (USNA), which won the gold medal in the men's eight.

He graduated from USNA in 1922, served during World War II and Korea, and rose to the rank of rear admiral. King died in Mill Valley, California, and is buried with his wife Marjorie in Golden Gate National Cemetery.
