= Thore Michelsen =

Norwegian rower (1888–1980)

Olympic medal record

Men's rowing
Bronze medal – third place	1920 Antwerp	Eight

Thore Michelsen (10 May 1888 – 17 May 1980) was a Norwegian rower who competed in the 1920 Summer Olympics.

In 1920 he won the bronze medal as crew member of the Norwegian boat in the men's eight competition.
