= Donald Johnston (rower) =

American rower (1899–1984)

Medal record

Men's rowing

Representing the United States

Olympic Games
Gold medal – first place	1920 Antwerp	Men's eight

Donald Henrie Johnston (September 30, 1899 – August 4, 1984) was an American rower who competed in the 1920 Summer Olympics. He died in Arlington, Virginia.

In 1920, he was part of the American boat from the United States Naval Academy (USNA), which won the gold medal in the men's eight. He graduated from USNA in 1922.
