= Frederik Koopman =

Dutch rower

Personal information
- Full name: Frederik Ernst Koopman
- Nationality: Dutch
- Born: 22 October 1887; Dordrecht, Netherlands
- Died: 13 June 1980 (aged 92); Dordrecht, Netherlands

Sport
- Sport: Rowing

Frederik Ernst Koopman (22 October 1887 – 13 June 1980) was a Dutch rower. He competed in the men's eight event at the 1920 Summer Olympics.
