= Huibert Boumeester =

Dutch rower

Huibert Gerard Boumeester (18 October 1900 in Batavia, Dutch East Indies [now Jakarta] – 6 December 1959 in Utrecht) was a Dutch rower.

In 1920, he competed at the Summer Olympic Games in Antwerp, as a member of the Dutch Men's Eight With Coxswain (8+) rowing team. He was the youngest member of the Dutch team. The rowing competitions took place at the Willebroek canal, near Brussels. The course started near the Three Fountains inn in Vilvoorde, and ran to the Marly coking plant in Neder-Over-Heembeek. The Dutch team was eliminated in the first round by the French.

He was a member of the DSRV Laga rowing club in Delft. By profession, he was an electronics engineer.
