= Robin Johnstone =

British rowing cox (1901–1976)

Olympic medal record

Men's rowing
| Silver medal – second place | 1920 Antwerp | Eight |

Robin Talbot Johnstone (6 August 1901 – 20 February 1976) was a British rowing cox who competed in the 1920 Summer Olympics.

Johnstone was born at Ipswich, Suffolk and educated at Eton and Christ's College, Cambridge. He coxed Cambridge in The Boat Race in 1920. He also coxed the British boat that won the silver medal in the men's eight at the 1920 Summer Olympics at Antwerp.

Johnstone was later a flyer with Hanworth Club.

== See also ==
- List of Cambridge University Boat Race crews
