= Sebastian Earl =

British rower (1900–1983)

Olympic medal record

Men's rowing
Silver medal – second place	1920 Antwerp	Eight

Sebastian Earl (2 January 1900 – 10 April 1983) was a British rower who competed in the 1920 Summer Olympics.

Earl was born at Tonbridge Kent, the son of Alfred Earl and was educated at Eton and Magdalen College Oxford. He was an accomplished rower and in 1920 he was a member of the Oxford crew rowing four times in the Boat Race. Earl was also a member of the Leander eight which won the silver medal for Great Britain rowing at the 1920 Summer Olympics in Antwerp, coming within half a length of winning. He rowed for Oxford again in the Boat Race in 1921 and 1922. He joined the John Lewis Partnership and later worked at Selfridges. He married Honor Earl, Daughter of Frederick Maugham in 1925 and had two children, Julian Romer Earl born 1927 and Quentin Stephen Earl born 1931.

== See also ==
- List of Oxford University Boat Race crews
