= Ralph Shove =

British rower

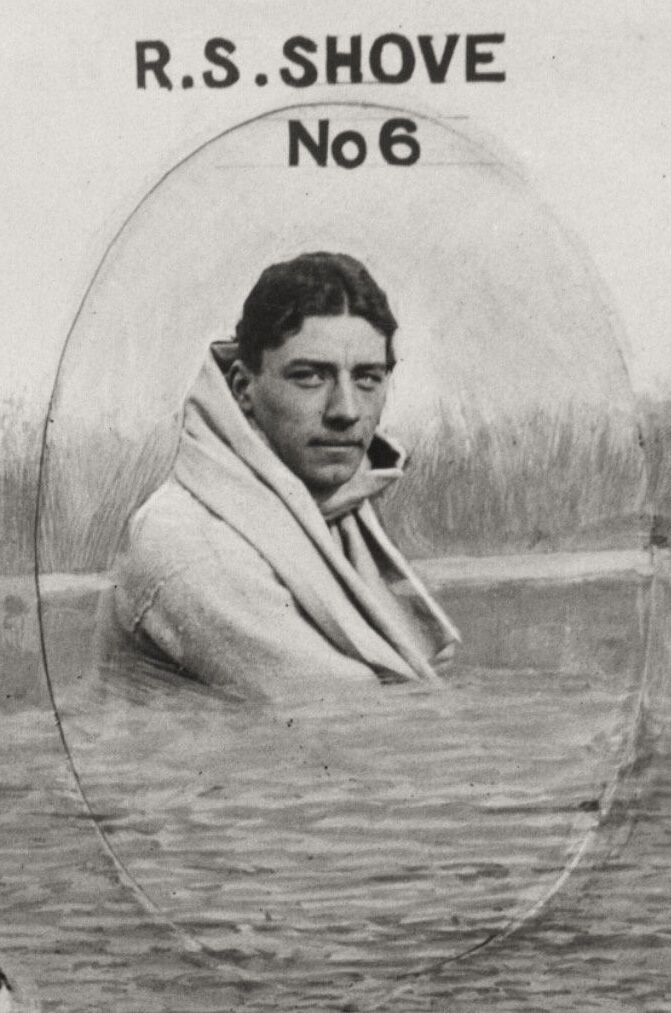

Medal record

Men's rowing
Silver medal – second place	1920 Antwerp	Eight

Ralph Samuel Shove (31 May 1889 – 2 February 1966) was a British County Court judge and a rower who competed in the 1920 Summer Olympics.

== Biography ==
Shove was born at Faversham, Kent, the son of Herbert Samuel Shove and his wife Bertha Millen. He was educated at Uppingham School, where he was a first team rugby player, and at Trinity College, Cambridge. At Cambridge he rowed in the Cambridge boat in the Boat races in 1912 and 1913.

Shove was called to the bar at Inner Temple. During World War I he served in the Royal Field Artillery, and went to France in November 1914. He was a captain, and was once wounded.

Shove was captain of the Leander eight which won the silver medal for Great Britain rowing at the 1920 Summer Olympics, coming within half a length of winning.

Shove was appointed as a County Court Judge and J. P. in 1945, and became vice-chairman of the Lindsey Quarter Sessions. He was chairman of the Kesteven and Holland Quarter Sessions from 1946.

Shove lived at The Old Hall, Washingboro, Lincoln, and died at North Kesteven, Lincolnshire at the age of 76. His elder brother was the Cambridge economist Gerald Shove.

Shove married Evelyn Forster at South Kensington on 31 July 1928

== See also ==
- List of Cambridge University Boat Race crews
