= John Campbell (rower) =

British rower (1899–1939)

Olympic medal record

Men's rowing
Silver medal – second place	1920 Antwerp	Eight

John Alan Campbell (13 April 1899 – 20 February 1939) was a British rower who competed in the 1920 Summer Olympics.

Campbell was educated at Melbourne Grammar School and Jesus College, Cambridge. He rowed for Cambridge in the Boat Race in 1920. In 1920 he was a crew member of the British boat, which won the silver medal in the eights at the Summer Olympics. In 1921 he rowed in the Boat Race again and won Silver Goblets at Henley Royal Regatta partnering Humphrey Playford.

== See also ==
- List of Cambridge University Boat Race crews
