= Sidney Swann =

British clergyman and rower

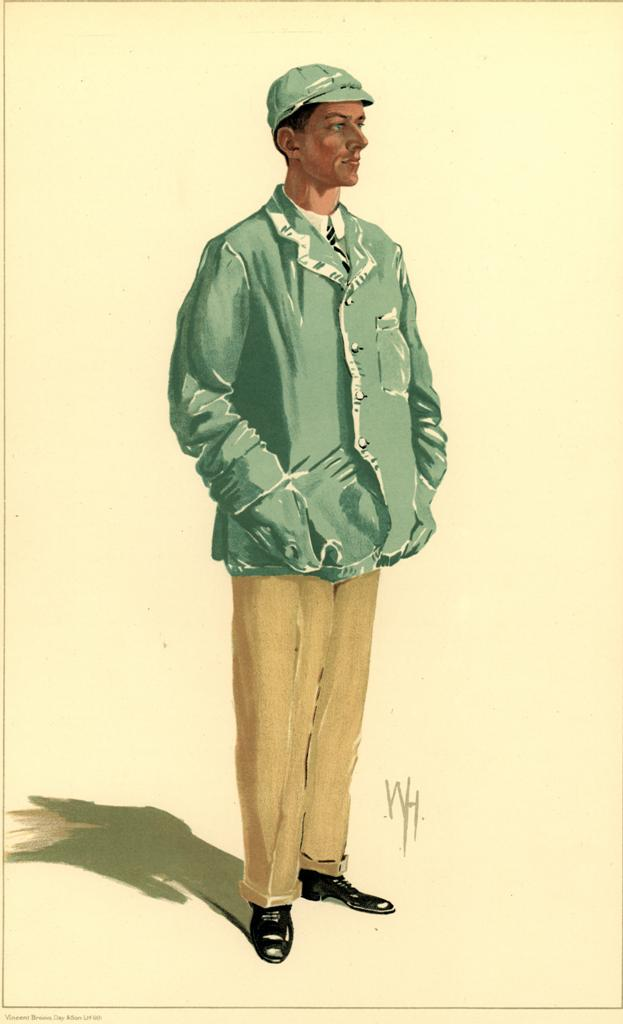
- Vanity Fair caricature, 1912

Medal record

Men's rowing

Representing Great Britain

Olympic Games
Gold medal – first place	1912 Stockholm	Eight
Silver medal – second place	1920 Antwerp	Eight

Sidney Ernest Swann (24 June 1890 – 19 September 1976) was a Manx-English clergyman and a rower who competed for Great Britain in the 1912 Summer Olympics and in the 1920 Summer Olympics.

== Biography ==
Swann was born at Sulby, Lezayre, Isle of Man, the son of Sydney Swann, a rower and clergyman who took his family to Japan, where he was a missionary. He was educated at Rugby School, where he had no rowing experience, and Trinity Hall, Cambridge. At Cambridge, he won the Colquhoun Sculls in 1910 (as a freshman, having sculled only twenty-nine times before the event) and was in the winning crew in the Visitors' Challenge Cup and Wyfolds Henley Royal Regatta, also in 1910. Swann won the Lowe Double Sculls at Cambridge in 1911 and was a member of the Cambridge crew in the Boat Race in 1911 and 1912. 12 September 1911, Swann set the record for rowing across the English Channel in a single row of 3 hours and 50 minutes. Swann was a member of Leander Club and was the sole Cambridge man in the Leander eight, which won the gold medal for Great Britain rowing at the 1912 Summer Olympics. He was the first Manx person to have won an Olympic Gold, and it would not be until 2012 until another Manx person won a Gold. Swann won the University Pairs in 1913 and the Grand Challenge Cup at Heley in 1913. He won Silver Goblets at Henley in 1913 and 1914 partnering his brother Alfred. In 1914 he was C.U.B.C. President in the winning crew in the 1914 Boat Race.

Swann became a clergyman and was a chaplain to the forces during the First World War. He returned to Trinity Hall as Chaplain, where he helped with Cambridge rowing in the early 1920s. He rowed in the Leander boat, which won the Silver Medal for Great Britain rowing at the 1920 Summer Olympics.

Swann moved to Nairobi as Archdeacon from 1926 to 1927, to Egypt in the same position in 1928, and returned to England in 1933, where he became vicar of Leighton Buzzard. In 1937 he became vicar of St Mary Redcliffe, Bristol and in 1941 was appointed Chaplain to King George VI. In 1943, he became the first principal of the RAF Chaplains' School based at Magdalene College, Cambridge: it taught a Moral Leadership Course (i.e. Christian ethics) for officers and airmen of the RAF, and a Chaplains' Course as a refresher for veteran chaplains. He was chosen, in part, because of the sporting background was prized among military chaplains. In 1944, he was succeeded as principal by John Bateman-Champain, a former first-class cricketer. He retired as Canon Emeritus of Bristol Cathedral.

On his father’s death in 1942, Swann became president of the National Amateur Rowing Association (NARA) and held the post until 1956, when the Amateur Rowing Association (ARA) removed manual labour as a disqualification for amateur status, and the two organisations merged.

Swann died at Minehead, Somerset at the age of 86.

== Sources ==
- The Rowers of Vanity Fair
