= Christiania RK =

Rowing club in Oslo, Norway

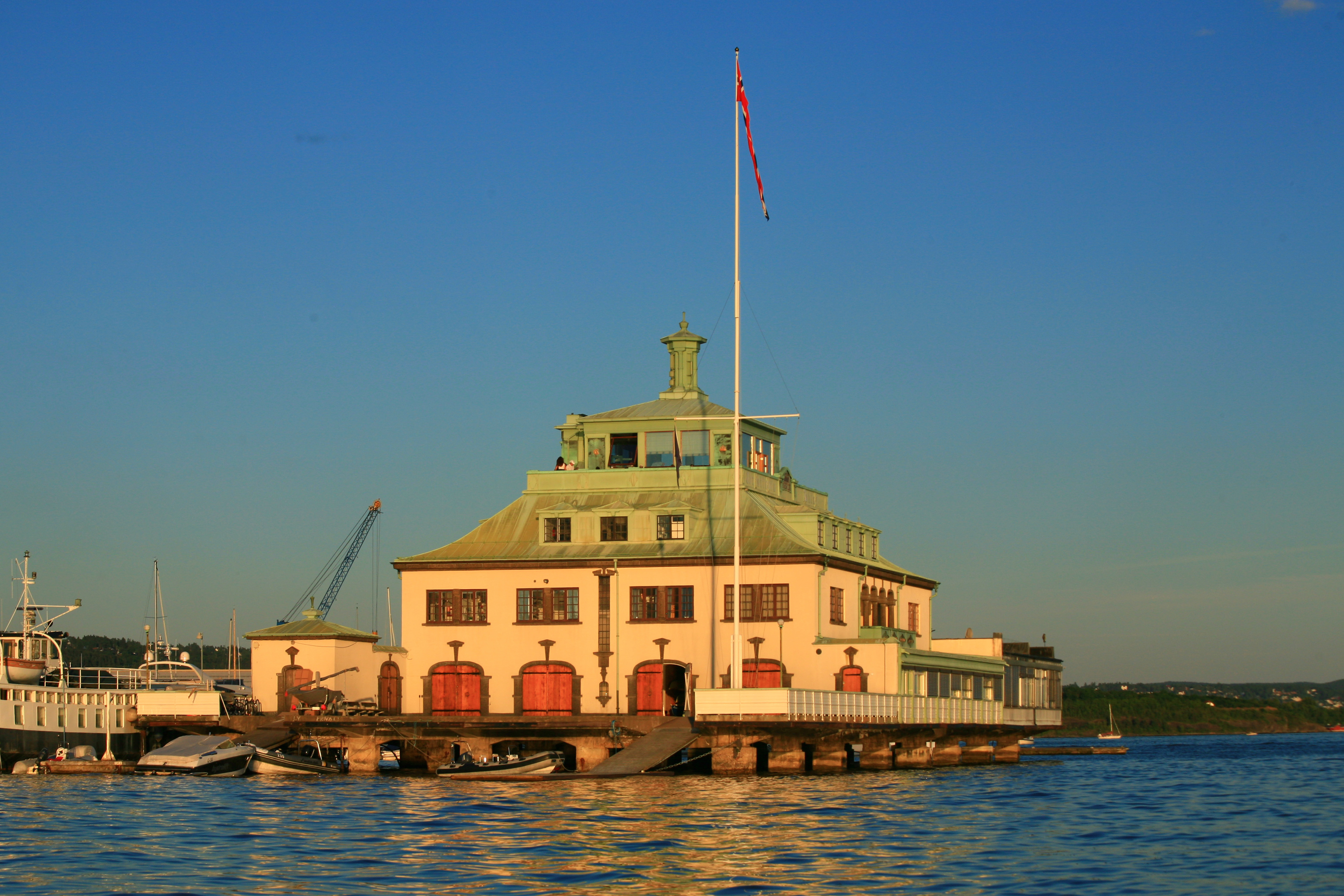
View of Christiania Roklub

Christiania Roklub is a rowing club from Oslo, Norway.

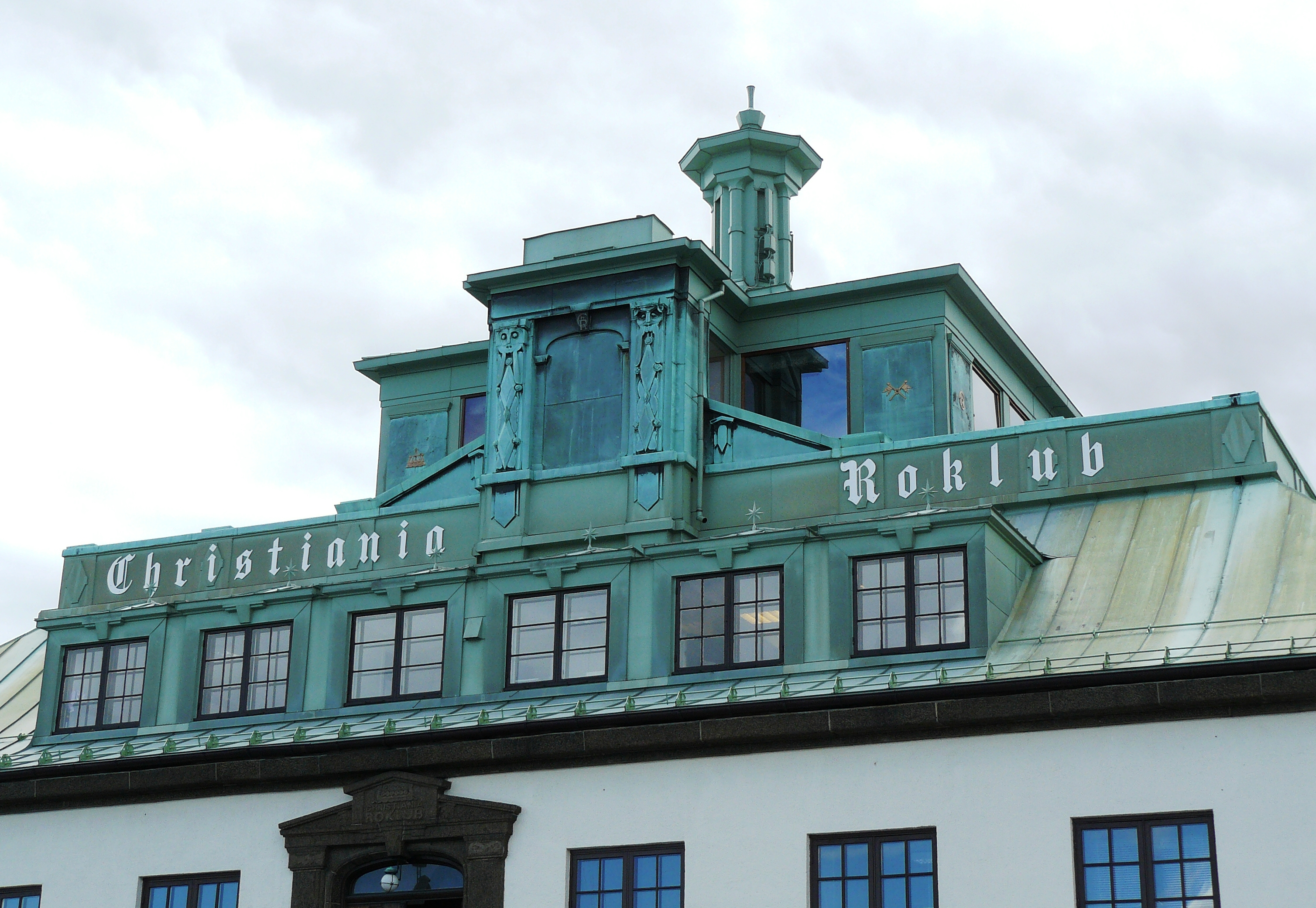
"Kongen"

Established in 1878, it is based in Frognerkilen in the Oslofjord, not far from Skarpsno. Its characteristic club house is called "Kongen" ('The King'), and was erected in 1925.

Well-known members of the club include the 1912 Olympic competitors in the coxed fours event—Henry Larsen, Mathias Torstensen, Theodor Klem, Håkon Tønsager and Ejnar Tønsager—and the 1920 Olympic bronze medallists in the same event—Birger Var, Theodor Klem, Henry Larsen, Per Gulbrandsen and Thoralf Hagen—as well as later competitors, like Pål Børnick.

== Honours ==
=== Henley Royal Regatta ===
| Year | Races won |
|---|---|
| 1921 | Thames Challenge Cup |
