= Lager (disambiguation) =

Lager is a type of beer.

Lager may also refer to:

- Nazi concentration camps, or Konzentrationslager, abbreviated Lager
- Låger, a dialect of the Ladin language

== People ==
- Bengt Lager (born 1951), Swedish modern pentathlete
- Brad Lager (born 1975), American politician from Missouri
- Fritjof Lager (1905–1973), Swedish communist politician
- Gunnar Lager (1888–1960), Swedish rower
- Hans Lager (born 1952), Swedish modern pentathlete
- Kris Lager, American blues rock musician
- John Lager (1887–1961), Swedish rower

== See also ==
- Saint-Lager, French commune
- Lagger, surname
