= Gunnar Öhman =

Swedish politician (1904–1970)

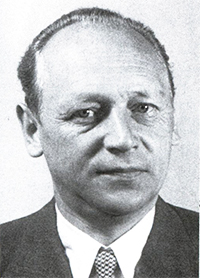
A Swedish politician, Gunnar Öhman

Lars Gunnar Öhman (20 October 1904 – 7 October 1970) was a Swedish politician, belonging to the Communist Party of Sweden.

Öhman was the son of Erik Öhman (farmer and shoemaker) and Anna Svedlund. His older brother, Oscar Öhman, was a member of parliament from 1929 to 1932. Gunnar Öhman worked as sawmills in Medelpad between 1918 and 1924. He worked at the Sundsvall newspaper Norrlands-Kuriren 1924 to 1928. During these four years he was the secretary of the Young Communist League district unit in Medelpad.

When the Communist Party suffered a major split in 1929, Gunnar Öhman remained loyal to the party. His brother, Oscar, on the other hand sided with the Karl Kilbom faction.

Rising in the party ranks following the split, Öhman was one of the 'men of 1929' grouping (with Hilding Hagberg, Fritjof Lager, Gunnar Johansson) that would dominate the party affairs for several decades to come. In 1932 he moved to Norrbotten, working at Norrskensflamman and as organizer of the Communist Party district unit. In 1933 he became a Central Committee member of the party (a post he would hold until 1963). In 1934 he became secretary of the Stockholm-Mälardalen district of the party. In 1936 he was included in the politburo of the party.

Öhman sat in the Stockholm City Council between 1942 and 1954. He also served as chairman of the Stockholm Communist Labour Commune. He was replaced by Fritjof Lager in this post in 1952. Between 1943 and 1948 he served as national party secretary. In 1953 he was appointed editor-in-chief of Ny Dag. In 1957 he became the editor of Vår Tid. According to a 1961 article in Der Spiegel, Öhman was the ideologue of the party at the time.

Öhman represented Stockholm in the First Chamber 1946–1953. He was later elected from Gothenburg, representing the constituency in the First Chamber 1955–1962. He led the communist parliamentary faction in the First Chamber 1955–1962.
