= Max Rudolf =

Max Rudolf may refer to:

- Max Rudolf (conductor) (1902–1995), German conductor
- Max Rudolf (rower) (born 1891), Swiss rower
