= Östergren =

Östergren is a Swedish surname. Notable people with the surname include:

- Klas Östergren (born 1955), Swedish writer
- Maria Östergren (born 1978), Swedish cyclist
- Mary Ostergren (born 1960), American biathlete
- Nestor Östergren (1890 – 1970), Swedish Olympic rower
- Petra Östergren (born 1965), Swedish feminist writer
