= Regal Lager, Inc. =

Regal Lager Incorporated
- Type: Private
- Industry: Wholesale Consumer Goods
- Founded: Marietta, Georgia (1991)
- Headquarters: Kennesaw, Georgia, USA
- Key people: Bengt Lager, President; Luanne Whiting-Lager, Vice-President
- Products: Dekor Diaper Pails, Terra Eco Baby Products, Lascal, Qdos and Matchstick Monkey
- Number of employees: 24 (August 2023)
- Website: www.regallager.com

Regal Lager, Inc. is a distributor of baby and children's products to both the United States and Canada, and is located in Kennesaw, Georgia. Regal Lager, Inc. works with companies outside the United States, and is known in the baby industry as a push-distributor as they not only provide distribution for their products, but marketing and advertising as well. They are best known for establishing the Baby Björn baby carrier brand in the United States throughout the 1990s. The company won The Swedish Trade Council's annual achievement award for Superb Consumer Market Adaptability in North America in 2001. Today Regal Lager, Inc. is currently responsible for the distribution of the Love To Dream, Dekor, Lascal, Qdos and Nomi brands.

== History ==
Regal Lager began as a small, family owned business started by husband and wife team of Bengt Lager and Luanne Whiting-Lager in the basement of their Georgia home in 1991.

The idea of starting a business in the juvenile products industry began when the Lagers had their first child in Sweden. Based on the positive feedback they received from friends and family members in the United States, they decided to bring their well-designed baby products from Sweden to the United States.

Upon the birth of their second daughter three years later, they moved forward by researching business trends in the United States and as a result, they decided to start a mail order catalog business in the United States to sell Swedish products. However, after much consideration and advice from industry leaders, the two decided to take on the role as distributor. One of Regal Lager’s first manufacturers was the Swedish brand: Baby Björn; which they worked to build it to the popularity it enjoys in the United States.

The small family business grew to a large family business now with an 80,000-square-foot (7,400 m^{2}) warehouse in Kennesaw, GA, 16 full-time employees, and six international brands.

== Awards and recognition ==
- Safe Kids Cobb County Corporate Partner 2010
- Bambino Mio Distributor of the Year, Best Marketing Initiative 2009/2010
- Bambino Mio Distributor of the Year, Best Marketing Initiative 2008/2009
- 2008 Honoree at First Candle's Annual Benefit Event, The Windflower Ball
- Owner Bengt Lager served as President for the Juvenile Products Manufacturers Association (JPMA) from 2004—2005
- Regal Lager, Inc. wins the 2003 JPMA Innovation Award for the Baby Bjorn Active Carrier
- The Swedish Trade Council’s annual achievement award for Superb Consumer Market Adaptability in North America, 2000
