= Türler =

Türler or Turler is a surname. Notable people with the surname include:

- Franz Türler, Swiss rower
- Michel Turler (1944–2010), Swiss ice hockey player
