= Paul Rudolph =

Paul Rudolph or Rudolf may refer to:

- Paul Rudolph (architect) (1918–1997), American architect
- Paul Rudolph (musician) (born 1947), Canadian guitarist
- Paul Rudolph (physicist) (1858–1935), German optical mathematician who designed lenses for the Zeiss company
- Paul Rudolf (rower) (1892–1956), Swiss rower who competed in the 1920 Summer Olympics
- Paul Rudolph (American football), former head coach of Minot State Beavers football team
- Paul Rudolph, character in the 1988 film The Accused
