= Sundholm =

Sundholm may refer to:

- Steve Sundholm (born June 5, 1974), American record producer
- Karl Sundholm (1885–1955), Swedish rower
