= Lagger =

Lagger is a surname. Notable people with the surname include:

- Ed Lagger (1912–1981), American baseball player
- Goffredo Lagger (1901–?), Italian biathlete
- Peter Lagger (1930–1979), Swiss bass singer

== See also ==
- Lag (disambiguation)
- Lager (disambiguation)
- Laggers Point
