= Dahll =

Dahll is a Norwegian surname. Notable people with the surname include:

- Kygo (born Kyrre Gørvell-Dahll in 1991), Norwegian musician, DJ, songwriter and record producer
- Lars Christian Dahll (1823–1908), Norwegian military officer and politician
- Olaf Dahll (1889–1968), Norwegian competitive rower
- Tellef Dahll (1825–1893), Norwegian mineralogist and geologist
- Tellef Dahll Schweigaard (1806–1886), Norwegian politician

== See also ==
- Dahl (surname)
