= Pierre Alibert =

French rower

Personal information
- Nationality: French
- Born: 26 June 1892; Saint-Magne-de-Castillon, France

Sport
- Sport: Rowing

Pierre Alibert (born 26 June 1892, date of death unknown) was a French rower. He competed in the men's coxed four event at the 1912 Summer Olympics.
