= Bastiaan Veth =

Dutch rower

Personal information
- Nationality: Dutch
- Born: 24 October 1891; Dordrecht, Netherlands
- Died: 3 August 1947 (aged 55); Rotterdam, Netherlands

Sport
- Sport: Rowing

Bastiaan Veth (24 October 1891 – 3 August 1947) was a Dutch rower. He competed in the men's double sculls event at the 1920 Summer Olympics.
