= Guilherme Lorena =

Brazilian rower

Personal information
- Nationality: Brazilian
- Born: 7 November 1884
- Died: 14 June 1949 (aged 54)

Sport
- Sport: Rowing

Guilherme Lorena (7 November 1884 – 14 June 1949) was a Brazilian rower. He competed in the men's coxed four event at the 1920 Summer Olympics.
