= Geoffrey Carr =

British coxswain

Olympic medal record

Men's rowing
Silver medal – second place	1912 Stockholm	Coxed four

Geoffrey Carr (22 January 1886 – 13 July 1969) was a British rowing coxswain who competed in the 1912 Summer Olympics.

Carr was born in Putney and became a member of Thames Rowing Club. He was the coxswain of the Thames Rowing Club coxed four which won the silver medal for Great Britain rowing at the 1912 Summer Olympics.
