= Strathy Hay =

Canadian rower

Personal information
- Born: 10 May 1897; Toronto, Ontario, Canada
- Died: 5 April 1973 (aged 75); Toronto, Ontario, Canada

Sport
- Sport: Rowing

Strathy Hay (10 May 1897 – 5 April 1973) was a Canadian rower. He competed in the men's coxed four event at the 1920 Summer Olympics.
