= Carl Klose =

American rower (1891–1988)

Olympic medal record

Men's rowing
Silver medal – second place	1920 Antwerp	Coxed four

Carl Otto Klose (December 5, 1891 – January 15, 1988) was an American rower who competed in the 1920 Summer Olympics. In 1920 he was part of the American boat, which won the silver medal in the coxed fours event.
