= Léonard Nuytens =

Belgian coxswain

Personal information
- Born: 7 September 1892 Ghent, Belgium
- Died: 6 December 1962 (aged 70)

Sport
- Sport: Rowing
- Club: KRSG, Gent
Medal record
Men's rowing
Representing Belgium
European Rowing Championships
Silver medal – second place	1912 Geneva	Coxed four

Léonard Nuytens (7 September 1892 – 6 December 1962) was a Belgian coxswain. He competed at the 1912 Summer Olympics in Stockholm with the men's coxed four where they were eliminated in the quarter finals.
