= Axel Eriksson (rower) =

Swedish rower

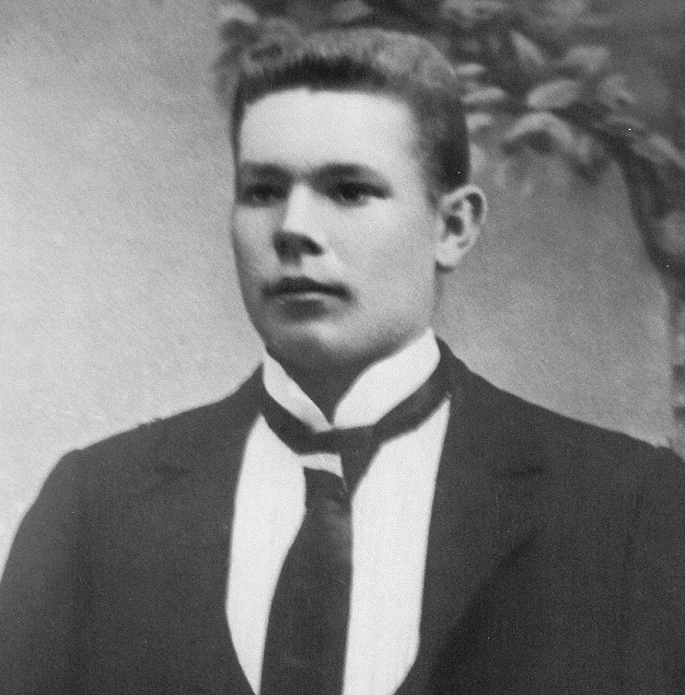

Personal information
- Born: 10 March 1884 Vaxholm, Sweden
- Died: 20 December 1975 (aged 91) Vaxholm, Sweden
- Relatives: Gösta Eriksson (brother)

Sport
- Sport: Rowing
- Club: Vaxholms RF

Axel Emanuel Eriksson (10 March 1884 – 20 December 1975) was a Swedish rower who competed in the 1912 and 1920 Summer Olympics. In 1912 he was a member of the Swedish boat Vaxholm that was eliminated in the first round of the coxed four competition. Eight years later, he rowed with his younger brother Gösta as a coxswain, and they were again eliminated in the first round.
