= Pietro Annoni =

Italian rower (1886–1960)

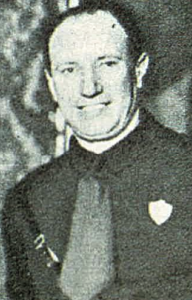

Personal information
- Born: 14 December 1886 Milan, Italy
- Died: 19 April 1960 (aged 73) Milan, Italy

Sport
- Sport: Rowing
- Club: Canottieri Milano, Milan
Medal record
Men's rowing
Representing Italy
Olympic Games
Silver medal – second place	1920 Antwerp	Double sculls
European Rowing Championships
Gold medal – first place	1912 Geneva	Double sculls

Pietro Annoni (14 December 1886, in Milan – 19 April 1960) was an Italian rower who competed in the 1920 Summer Olympics.

In 1920 he won the silver medal with his partner Erminio Dones in the double sculls event.
