= Jan Bauch (rowing) =

Czechoslovak rowing cox

Personal information
- Nationality: Czech
- Born: 16 November 1898 Prague, Austria-Hungary

Sport
- Sport: Rowing

Jan Bauch (born 16 November 1898) was a Czechoslovak rowing coxswain. He competed in the men's coxed four event at the 1920 Summer Olympics.
