= Edmond Vanwaes =

Belgian rower

Personal information
- Born: 7 March 1892 Ledeberg
- Died: 31 May 1944 (aged 52) Natzweiler-Struthof concentration camp

Sport
- Sport: Rowing
- Club: KRSG, Gent
Medal record
Men's rowing
Representing Belgium
European Rowing Championships
Gold medal – first place	1910 Ostend	Eight
Silver medal – second place	1912 Geneva	Coxed four

Edmond Vanwaes, also Van Waes, (born 8 March 1892, dead 31 May 1944) was a Belgian rower. He competed at the 1912 Summer Olympics in Stockholm with the men's coxed four where they were eliminated in the quarter finals.
