= Léon Vleurinck =

Belgian rower

Personal information
- Born: Léon Jean Alfred Vleurinck; 11 July 1899 Ghent, Belgium
- Died: 25 November 1982 (aged 83) Ghent, Belgium

Sport
- Sport: Rowing
- Club: Royal Club Nautique de Gand
Medal record
Men's rowing
Representing Belgium
European Rowing Championships
Bronze medal – third place	1921 Amsterdam	Eight

Léon Jean Alfred Vleurinck (11 July 1899 – 25 November 1982) was a Belgian rower. He competed at the 1920 Summer Olympics in Antwerp with the men's coxed four where they were eliminated in round one.
