= Gaston Giran =

French rower (1892–1944)

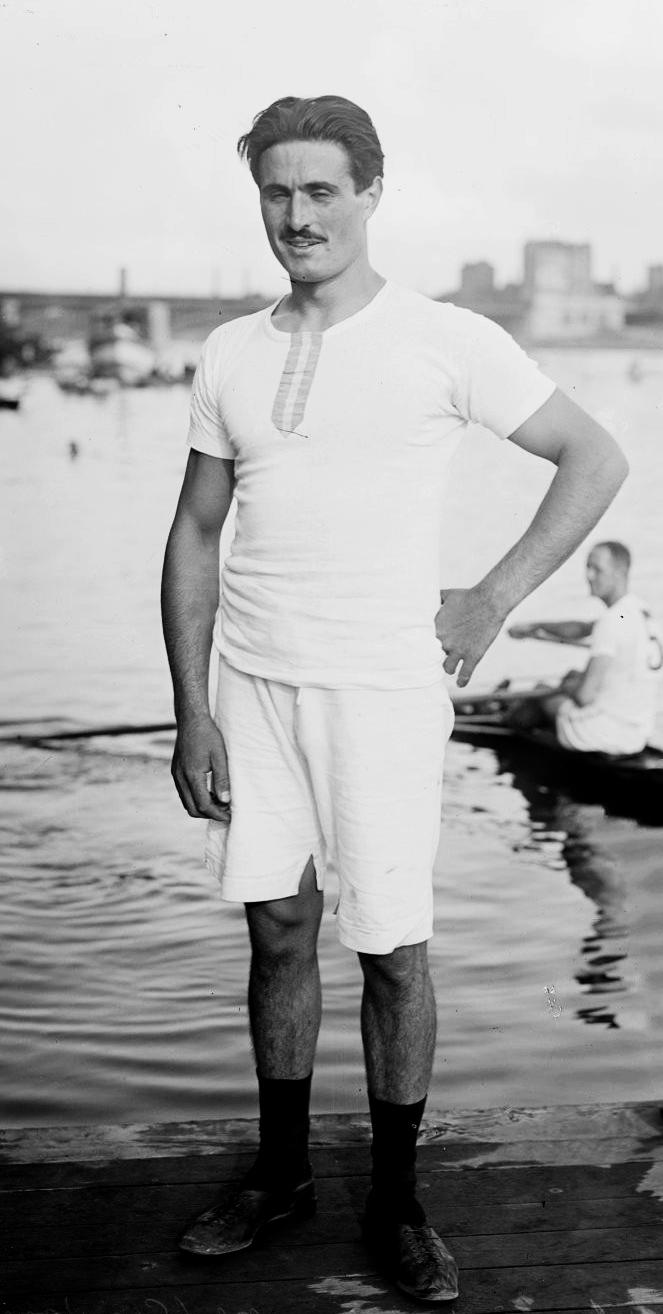
- Gaston Giran in 1919

Personal information
- Born: 12 February 1892 Paris, France
- Died: 26 April 1944 (aged 52)

Sport
- Sport: Rowing
- Club: Société Nautique de la Marne, Joinville-le-Pont
Medal record
Men's rowing
Representing France
Olympic Games
Bronze medal – third place	1920 Antwerp	Double sculls
European Rowing Championships
Gold medal – first place	1920 Mâcon	Double sculls

Roger Gaston Giran (12 February 1892 – 26 April 1944) was a French rower who had his best results in the double sculls, together with Alfred Plé. In 1920 they won the European title and a bronze Olympic medal.
