= Alfred Plé =

French rower (1888–1980)

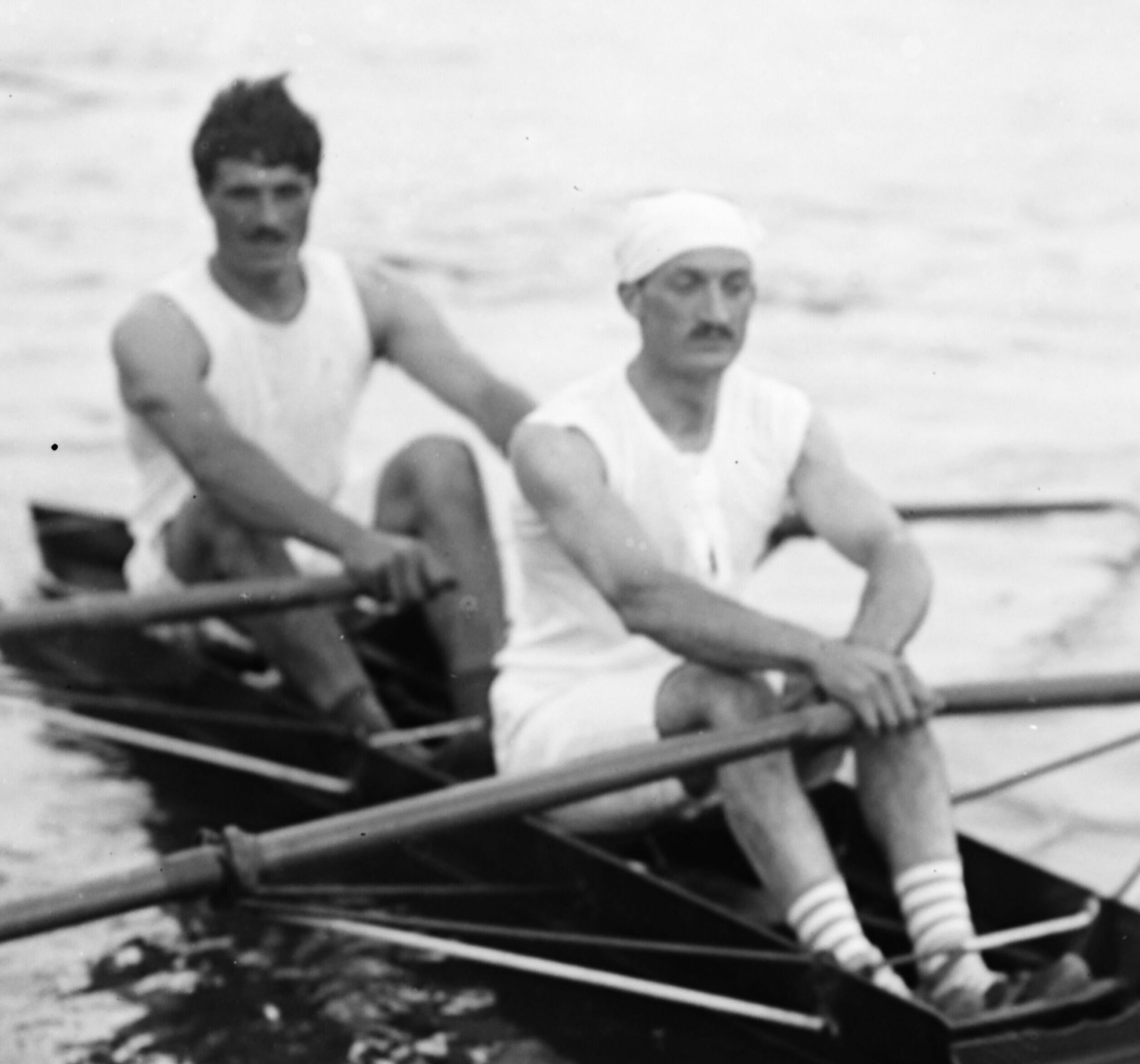
- Giran and Plé (right) at the 1920 European Championships

Personal information
- Born: 9 January 1888 Paris, France
- Died: 4 March 1980 (aged 92) Limeil-Brévannes, France

Sport
- Sport: Rowing
- Club: Société Nautique de la Marne, Joinville-le-Pont
Medal record
Men's rowing
Representing France
Olympic Games
Bronze medal – third place	1920 Antwerp	Double sculls
European Championships
Gold medal – first place	1920 Mâcon	Double sculls

Alfred Plé (9 January 1888 – 4 March 1980) was a French rower who had his best results in the double sculls, together with Gaston Giran. In 1920 they won the European title and a bronze Olympic medal.
