= Bjarne Eriksen (businessman) =

Norwegian businessman (1886–1976)

Personal information
- Born: 31 July 1886 Trondheim, Norway
- Died: 13 November 1976 (aged 90) Oslo, Norway

Sport
- Sport: Fencing

Bjarne Gotfred Eriksen (31 July 1886 – 13 November 1976) was a Norwegian businessperson and fencer.

He was born in Trondheim. He competed in the individual foil and épée events at the 1912 Summer Olympics. His brother Einar competed at the same Olympics in rowing.

He was hired as a Supreme Court barrister in 1917 but started a career in Norsk Hydro in 1926. He was originally head of the judicial and financial department but was promoted to Director-General (CEO) in 1941.

After the German occupation of Norway, the Germans wanted to further increase the output of heavy water; the situation escalated until Hydro's top management protested, and in early 1943, Bjarne Eriksen, the company's managing director, was arrested and sent to a concentration camp in Germany.

After the War, Erikson returned to his position, where he remained until 1956; after this, he was chairman of the board from 1957 to 1960.

Business positions
| Preceded by Axel Aubert | Director General of Norsk Hydro; 1941–1956 | Succeeded by Rolf Østbye |
