= Koos de Haas =

Dutch rower

Personal information
- Nationality: Dutch
- Born: 10 September 1889; Amsterdam, Netherlands
- Died: 30 September 1966 (aged 77); The Hague, Netherlands

Sport
- Sport: Rowing

Koos de Haas (10 September 1889 – 30 September 1966) was a Dutch rower. He competed in the men's double sculls event at the 1920 Summer Olympics.
