= Willy Brüderlin =

Swiss rower

Personal information
- Born: Wilhelm Brüderlin; 20 October 1894
- Died: unknown

Sport
- Sport: Rowing
- Club: Grasshopper Club Zürich
Medal record
Men's rowing
Representing Switzerland
Olympic Games
Gold medal – first place	1920 Antwerp	Coxed four
European Rowing Championships
Gold medal – first place	1920 Mâcon	Coxed four
Gold medal – first place	1920 Mâcon	Eight
Gold medal – first place	1921 Amsterdam	Coxed four
Gold medal – first place	1921 Amsterdam	Eight

Wilhelm Brüderlin (born 20 October 1894, date of death unknown) was a Swiss rower who competed in the 1920 Summer Olympics.

In 1920 he was part of the Swiss boat, which won the gold medal in the coxed four event. He was also a member of the Swiss eights which was eliminated in the first round of the eight competition.
