= Georges Willems =

Belgian rower

Personal information
- Born: 5 September 1888
- Died: unknown

Sport
- Sport: Rowing
- Club: KRSG, Gent
Medal record
Men's rowing
Representing Belgium
European Rowing Championships
Gold medal – first place	1910 Ostend	Eight
Silver medal – second place	1912 Geneva	Coxed four

Georges Willems (born 5 September 1888, date of death unknown) was a Belgian rower. He competed at the 1912 Summer Olympics in Stockholm with the men's coxed four where they were eliminated in the quarter-finals.
