= Robert Hay (rower) =

Canadian rower

Personal information
- Born: 10 May 1897; Toronto, Ontario, Canada
- Died: 11 August 1968 (aged 71); Toronto, Ontario, Canada

Sport
- Sport: Rowing

Robert Hay (10 May 1897 – 11 August 1968) was a Canadian rower. He competed in the men's coxed four event at the 1920 Summer Olympics.
