= Rowing at the 1920 Summer Olympics – Men's double sculls =

Men's double sculls at the Games of the VII Olympiad
- Venue: Brussels–Scheldt Maritime Canal
- Dates: 27–29 August 1920
- Competitors: 10 from 5 nations

Medalists
1st place, gold medalist(s)		Paul Costello, John B. Kelly Sr. United States
2nd place, silver medalist(s)		Pietro Annoni, Erminio Dones; Italy
3rd place, bronze medalist(s)		Gaston Giran, Alfred Plé; France

The men's double sculls event was part of the rowing programme at the 1920 Summer Olympics. The competition was held from 27 to 29 August 1920. It was the second appearance of the event, which had previously been held only at the rowing competitions in 1904. Ten rowers, in five pairs from five different nations, competed.

== Results ==
=== Semifinals ===
Semifinal 1
Place	Rowers	Time	Qual.
1	Erminio Dones and Pietro Annoni (ITA)	7:25.4	Q
2	Ernest Sadzawka and Georges Léonet (BEL)	7:34.8	
Semifinal 2
Place	Rower	Time	Qual.
1	Alfred Plé and Gaston Giran (FRA)	7:26.0	Q
Semifinal 3
Place	Rowers	Time	Qual.
1	John B. Kelly Sr. and Paul Costello (USA)	7:16.8	Q
2	Bastiaan Veth and Koos de Haas (NED)	7:24.8	

=== Final ===
Final
Place	Rower	Time
Gold	John B. Kelly Sr. and Paul Costello (USA)	7:09.0
Silver	Erminio Dones and Pietro Annoni (ITA)	7:19.0
Bronze	Alfred Plé and Gaston Giran (FRA)	7:21.0

== Sources ==
- Belgium Olympic Committee (1957). Olympic Games Antwerp 1920: Official Report (in French).
- Wudarski, Pawel (1999). "Wyniki Igrzysk Olimpijskich" (in Polish).
