= Valdemar Henriksson =

Finnish coxswain

Personal information
- Nationality: Finnish
- Born: 18 July 1884; Saint Petersburg, Russia
- Died: 17 February 1929 (aged 44); Helsinki, Finland

Sport
- Sport: Rowing

Valdemar Henriksson (18 July 1884 – 17 February 1929) was a Finnish rowing coxswain. He competed in the men's coxed four event at the 1912 Summer Olympics.
