= Art Everett =

Canadian rower

Personal information
- Full name: Arthur James Everett
- Born: 2 February 1891; Toronto, Ontario, Canada
- Died: 1983 (aged 91–92)

Sport
- Sport: Rowing

Arthur James Everett (2 February 1891 – 1983) was a Canadian rowing coxswain. He competed in the men's coxed four event at the 1920 Summer Olympics.
