= Rudolf Fickeisen =

German rower

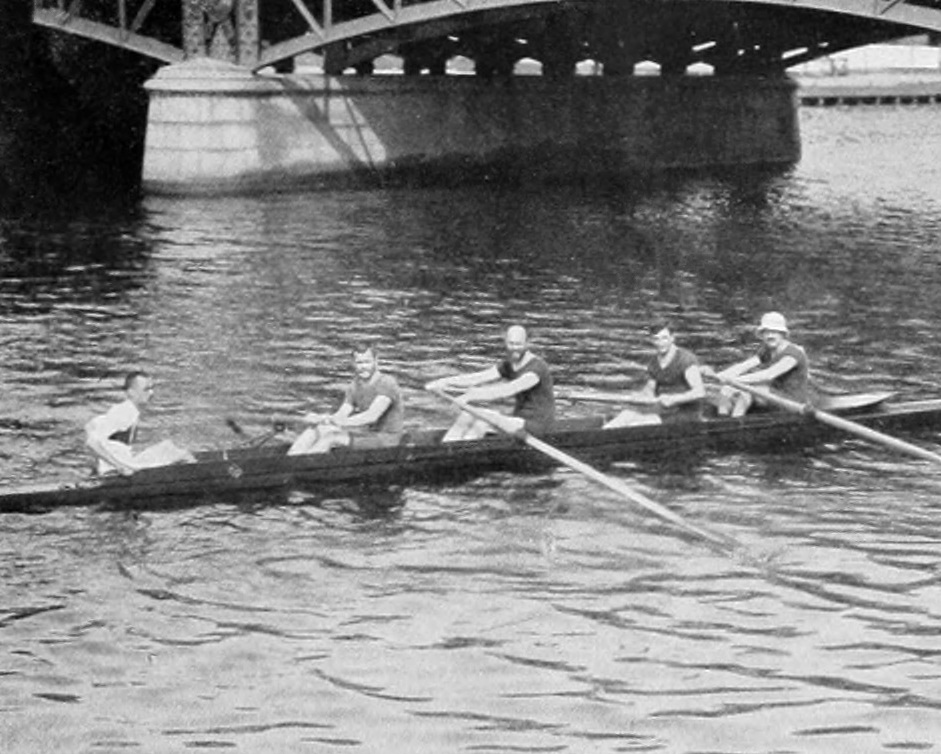
- Fickeisen at the 1912 Olympics

Personal information
- Born: 15 May 1885 Trippstadt, German Empire
- Died: 22 July 1944 (aged 59) Ludwigshafen, Germany
Medal record
Men's rowing at the Olympics
Representing Germany
Gold medal – first place	1912 Stockholm	Men's coxed four

Rudolf Fickeisen (15 May 1885 – 22 July 1944) was a German rower who competed in the 1912 Summer Olympics. He was a member of the German boat, which won the gold medal in the coxed fours.
