= Rowing at the 1912 Summer Olympics – Men's coxed four =

Men's coxed four at the Games of the V Olympiad
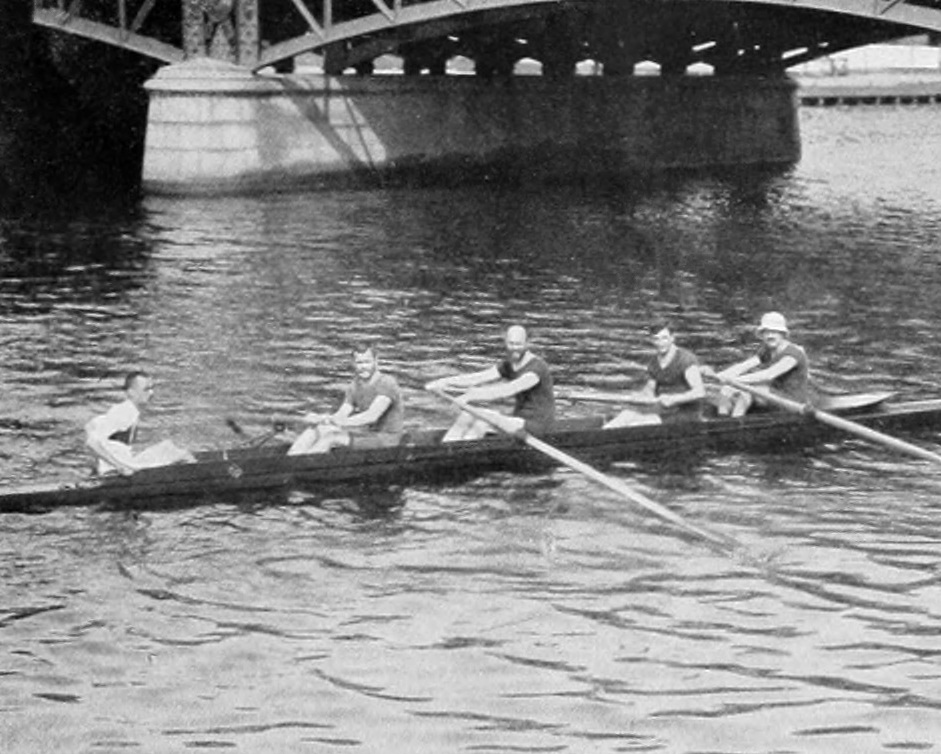
- The gold medal winning team of Germany
- Venue: Djurgårdsbrunnsviken
- Dates: 17 July 1912 (heats); 18 July 1912 (quarterfinals); 19 July 1912 (semifinals, final)
- Competitors: 56 from 9 nations
- Winning time: 6:59.4

Medalists
1st place, gold medalist(s)		Ludwigshafener Ruderverein; Germany
2nd place, silver medalist(s)		Thames Rowing Club; Great Britain
3rd place, bronze medalist(s)		Polyteknisk Roklub; Denmark
3rd place, bronze medalist(s)		Christiania RK; Norway

The men's coxed four was a rowing event held as part of the Rowing at the 1912 Summer Olympics programme. It was the second appearance of the event, which had been held at the 1900 Summer Olympics but had been replaced by coxless four at the 1904 and 1908 Games. The standard coxed four event allowed for outriggers, while another event was held in 1912 for boats with inriggers. The competition was held from 17 to 19 July 1912.

Fifty six rowers (11 boats) from nine nations competed. Germany replaced their coxswain, maybe the Danish Polyteknisk replaced a rower, but this possible change is not counted.

== Starting list ==
The following boats and/or rowing clubs participated:

- Austria Ruderverein Germania, Leibnitz (other sources report Leitmeritz)
- Belgium Royal Sport Nautique de Gand
- Denmark København Roklubb
- Denmark Polyteknisk Roklub
- Finland Helsingfors R. K.
- France Société Nautique de Bayonne
- Germany Ludwigshafener Ruderverein
- Great Britain Thames Rowing Club
- Norway Christiania RK
- Norway Studenternes Roklub
- Sweden Vaxholm Roddklubb

== Background ==
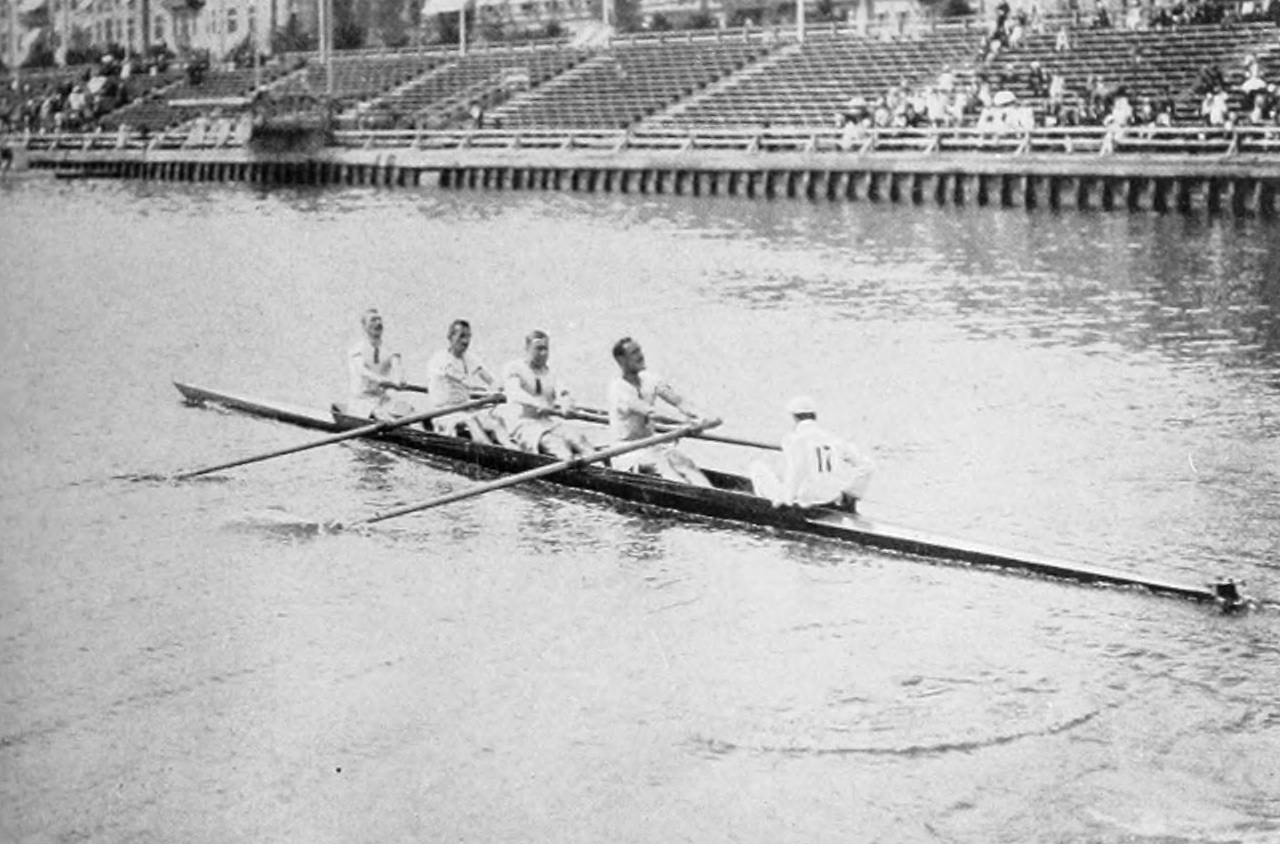
The silver medal winning team of Great Britain

This was the second appearance of the event. Rowing had been on the programme in 1896 but was cancelled due to bad weather. The coxed four was one of the four initial events introduced in 1900. It was not held in 1904 or 1908, but was held at every Games from 1912 to 1992 when it (along with the men's coxed pair) was replaced with the men's lightweight double sculls and men's lightweight coxless four.

At these Games, club teams competed rather than representative national sides. Ludwigshafener Ruderverein, a German club that earned bronze in 1900, was the only team to return (with an entirely new crew) from the Paris Games. Italian (1909 and 1910) and Swiss (1911 and 1912) crews had won the last four European championships, but did not compete in Stockholm. The favourites among the competing teams were Ludwigshafener and the British Thames Rowing Club, winners at Henley in 1909 and 1911.

Austria, Belgium, Denmark, Finland, Great Britain, Norway, and Sweden each made their debut in the event. France and Germany competed for the second time, having appeared at the only previous edition in 1900.

== Competition format ==
The coxed four event featured five-person boats, with four rowers and a coxswain. It was a sweep rowing event, with the rowers each having one oar (and thus each rowing on one side). It was the first Games to use the 2000 metres distance, which has been used ever since except at the 1948 Games.

The tournament featured four rounds of competition, with no repechages. Each race was head-to-head, with the winner advancing and the loser eliminated. There were 13 boats entered, so 7 heats were scheduled in the first round (including one bye); 2 boats withdrew, so 3 of the 7 heats ended up being walkovers. The quarterfinals featured 4 heats, again including one bye. There were 2 semifinals and 1 final.

== Schedule ==
Date	Time	Round
Wednesday, 17 July 1912	18:20	First round
Thursday, 18 July 1912	12:20	Quarterfinals
Friday, 19 July 1912	13:30; 17:30	Semifinals; Final

== Results ==
=== First round ===
All heats were held on Wednesday, 17 July.

==== Heat 1 ====
6.20 p.m. The Danish boat raced without opponent.

Rank	Boat	Nation	Bow	Rower No.2	Rower No.3	Stroke	Cox	Time	Notes
1	Polyteknisk	Denmark	Erik Bisgaard	Rasmus Frandsen	Mikael Simonsen	Poul Thymann	Ejgil Clemmensen	7:20.0	Q

==== Heat 2 ====
6.40 p.m.

For a long time the two boats kept side by side, both crews rowing in good style, the Frenchman at 38–32, the Finns at 40–32. During the last 500 metres, however, the last named crew went away from its opponents, which seemed unable to make any effective spurt.

— Official Report, p. 668

Rank	Boat	Nation	Bow	Rower No.2	Rower No.3	Stroke	Cox	Time	Notes
1	Helsinsfors R. K.	Finland	Johan Nyholm	Oskar Forsman	Karl Lönnberg	Emil Nylund	Valdemar Henriksson	7:18.2	Q
2	Société Nautique de Bayonne	France	André Mirambeau	Louis Thomaturgé	René Saintongey	Pierre Alibert	François Elichagaray	Unknown	

==== Heat 3 ====
7 p.m.

The Norwegian crew took the lead with much resolution, rowing in excellent style with a well-pronounced swing and a good grip of the water. The Austrians, too, rowed in good style but used the slide too early in the stroke, while their grip of the water was not quite so good as that of their opponents. The Norwegians went right away from their rivals and were the only ones to finish, Austria giving up the fight at the bridge.

— Official Report, p. 668

Rank	Boat	Nation	Bow	Rower No.2	Rower No.3	Stroke	Cox	Time	Notes
1	Christiania RK	Norway	Henry Larsen	Mathias Torstensen	Theodor Klem	Håkon Tønsager	Ejnar Tønsager	7:15.0	Q
2	Leibnitz	Austria	Richard Mayer	Hugo Cužna	Georg Kröder	Fritz Krombholz	Emil Jand	DNF	

==== Heat 4 ====
7.20 p.m.

The Norwegians undergraduates rowed over the course in good style.

— Official Report, p. 668

Rank	Boat	Nation	Bow	Rower No.2	Rower No.3	Stroke	Cox	Time	Notes
1	Studenternes	Norway	Øyvin Davidsen	Leif Rode	Theodor Schjøth	Olaf Dahll	Einar Eriksen	7:27.4	Q
—	Donau	Austria	—N/a					DNS	

==== Heat 5 ====
7.40 p.m.

Both boats started well, and kept together at an even speed until the 1,000 metres mark was reached. At this point the Danes delayed their response to the spurt made by the Belgians, and all the endeavours made during the remainder of the race to make up the two clear lengths lost at this point were in vain, the Belgians winning pretty easily.

— Official Report, pp. 668–69

Rank	Boat	Nation	Bow	Rower No.2	Rower No.3	Stroke	Cox	Time	Notes
1	Royal Sport Nautique de Gand	Belgium	Guillaume Visser	Georges Van Den Bossche	Edmond Vanwaes	Georges Willems	Léonard Nuytens	7:15.0	Q
2	Købnhavn	Denmark	Hans Jørgensen	Knud Gøtke	Johan Praem	Theodor Eyrich	Silva Smedberg	Unknown	

==== Heat 6 ====
8 p.m.

Both crews began with a quick stroke and lay side by side for some distance, but after the 1,000 metres mark, the Germans, without any exertion, led by about half a length, the same distance separating the boats when the boathouse was passed. In the finish, the Germans put themselves two lengths in front of their rivals, and won with the greatest ease.

— Official Report, p. 669

Rank	Boat	Nation	Bow	Rower No.2	Rower No.3	Stroke	Cox	Time	Notes
1	Ludwigshafener Ruderverein	Germany	Albert Arnheiter	Hermann Wilker	Rudolf Fickeisen	Otto Fickeisen	Otto Maier	7:06.6	Q
2	Vaxholm	Sweden	John Lager	Axel Eriksson	Ernst Wetterstrand	Gunnar Lager	Karl Sundholm	Unknown	

==== Heat 7 ====
8.20 p.m.

The British boat rowed over the course in a resolute but far from beautiful style.

— Official Report, p. 669

Rank	Boat	Nation	Bow	Rower No.2	Rower No.3	Stroke	Cox	Time	Notes
1	Thames Rowing Club	Great Britain	Julius Beresford	Karl Vernon	Charles Rought	Bruce Logan	Geoffrey Carr	7:27.0	Q
—	Mainz	Germany	—N/a					DNS	

=== Quarterfinals ===
All quarterfinals were held on Thursday, 18 July.

==== Quarterfinal 1 ====
12.20 p.m.

Half the course was covered with the boats side by side, the Finnish crew rowing 40 to the 32–34 of the Danes. The rapid stroke of the Finns was gained, however, at the expense of length, while the Danes rowed in beautiful style with a pronounced swing of the body and long, powerful strokes. At the bath-house the Danes, who had spurted after the half-distance, had a lead of about one and a half length, which was increased at the finish to nearly three lengths.

— Official Report, p. 669

Rank	Boat	Nation	Bow	Rower No.2	Rower No.3	Stroke	Cox	Time	Notes
1	Polyteknisk	Denmark	Erik Bisgaard	Rasmus Frandsen	Mikael Simonsen	Poul Thymann	Ejgil Clemmensen	7:09.0	Q
2	Helsinsfors R. K.	Finland	Johan Nyholm	Oskar Forsman	Karl Lönnberg	Emil Nylund	Valdemar Henriksson	7:12.5	

==== Quarterfinal 2 ====
12.40 p.m.

After rowing 600 metres, the British crew had a lead of about halt a length which, during the remainder of the race, was gradfully increased to some two and a half lengths.

— Official Report, p. 669

Rank	Boat	Nation	Bow	Rower No.2	Rower No.3	Stroke	Cox	Time	Notes
1	Thames R.C.	Great Britain	Julius Beresford	Karl Vernon	Charles Rought	Bruce Logan	Geoffrey Carr	7:14.5	Q
2	Studenternes	Norway	Øyvin Davidsen	Leif Rode	Theodor Schjøth	Olaf Dahll	Einar Eriksen	Unknown	

==== Quarterfinal 3 ====
1 p.m.

This was one of the most exciting heats in this round. Both crews rowed well from the start at 40 and 44 respectively, this speed afterwards falling to 32–36. The boats moved along rapidly side by side, but, in spite of the calls made by the strokes, neither crew showed any unevenness. Belgium led by about half a length at the boathouse, but the Norwegians had a lot in reserve and, after a brilliant finish, where the four rowed like one man, the last-named crew passed the post a clear length in front.

— Official Report, p. 670

Rank	Boat	Nation	Bow	Rower No.2	Rower No.3	Stroke	Cox	Time	Notes
1	Christiania RK	Norway	Henry Larsen	Mathias Torstensen	Theodor Klem	Håkon Tønsager	Ejnar Tønsager	7:05.5	Q
2	Royal Sport Nautique de Gand	Belgium	Guillaume Visser	Georges Van Den Bossche	Edmond Vanwaes	Georges Willems	Léonard Nuytens	Unknown	

==== Quarterfinal 4 ====
1.20 p.m. The German team had no opponent.

Rank	Boat	Nation	Bow	Rower No.2	Rower No.3	Stroke	Cox	Time	Notes
1	Ludwigshafener	Germany	Albert Arnheiter	Hermann Wilker	Rudolf Fickeisen	Otto Fickeisen	Otto Maier	7:14.4	Q

=== Semifinals ===
Both semifinals were held on Friday, 19 July.

==== Semifinal 1 ====
1.30 p.m.

The Danes rowed very energetically from the start and led by about half a length at the 500 metres mark. Here, however, the Germans came on with a short, powerful spurt, which gave them a lead that was afterwards retained, apparently without any great effort, and was gradually increased to about two and a half lengths, the distance separating the boats at the finish. The Germans crew possessed great physical power and was of a comparatively mature average age, features also characteristic of the English four representing the Thames R. C.. Ludwigshafen rowed, it is true, a pretty short stroke forwards, but, backwards, it was of a good length, with a quiet, finished recovery, and a powerful pull through the water. No. 3, with his billowing Germanic beard, reminded one of a Viking, and his appearance contrasted strangely with that of the other oarsmen, most of whom were clean shaven or had only small moustaches.

— Official Report, p. 670

Rank	Boat	Nation	Bow	Rower No.2	Rower No.3	Stroke	Cox	Time	Notes
1	Ludwigshafener	Germany	Albert Arnheiter	Hermann Wilker	Rudolf Fickeisen	Otto Fickeisen	Otto Maier	7:41.0	Q
3rd place, bronze medalist(s)	Polyteknisk	Denmark	Erik Bisgaard	Rasmus Frandsen	Mikael Simonsen	Poul Thymann	Ejgil Clemmensen	Unknown	

==== Semifinal 2 ====
2 p.m.

With an energetic spurt, Thames R. C. took the lead from the very start, and 500 metres later the Norwegian boat was nearly a length behind. Thames R. C. kept its same rapid stroke even when the 1,000 metres mark was passed, rowing in good style from 34–36 to the Norwegians' 32–34. The last-named crew, however, pulled itself together for a spurt when close to the bath-house, so that at the bridge there was only a length between the boats. In the finish, the Norwegians showed such energy, and rowed in such fine style, that their effort will be remembered as one of the most noteworthy episodes of the regatta. Inch by inch they crept up the leaders, so that, in spite of the energetic, really desperate strokes of the Thames R. C. crew, the two boats passed the post almost simultaneously. The Norwegians, however, were about three metres behind their opponents.

— Official Report, p. 670

Rank	Boat	Nation	Bow	Rower No.2	Rower No.3	Stroke	Cox	Time	Notes
1	Thames R. C.	Great Britain	Julius Beresford	Karl Vernon	Charles Rought	Bruce Logan	Geoffrey Carr	7:04.8	Q
3rd place, bronze medalist(s)	Christiania RK	Norway	Henry Larsen	Mathias Torstensen	Theodor Klem	Håkon Tønsager	Ejnar Tønsager	7:05.0	

=== Final ===
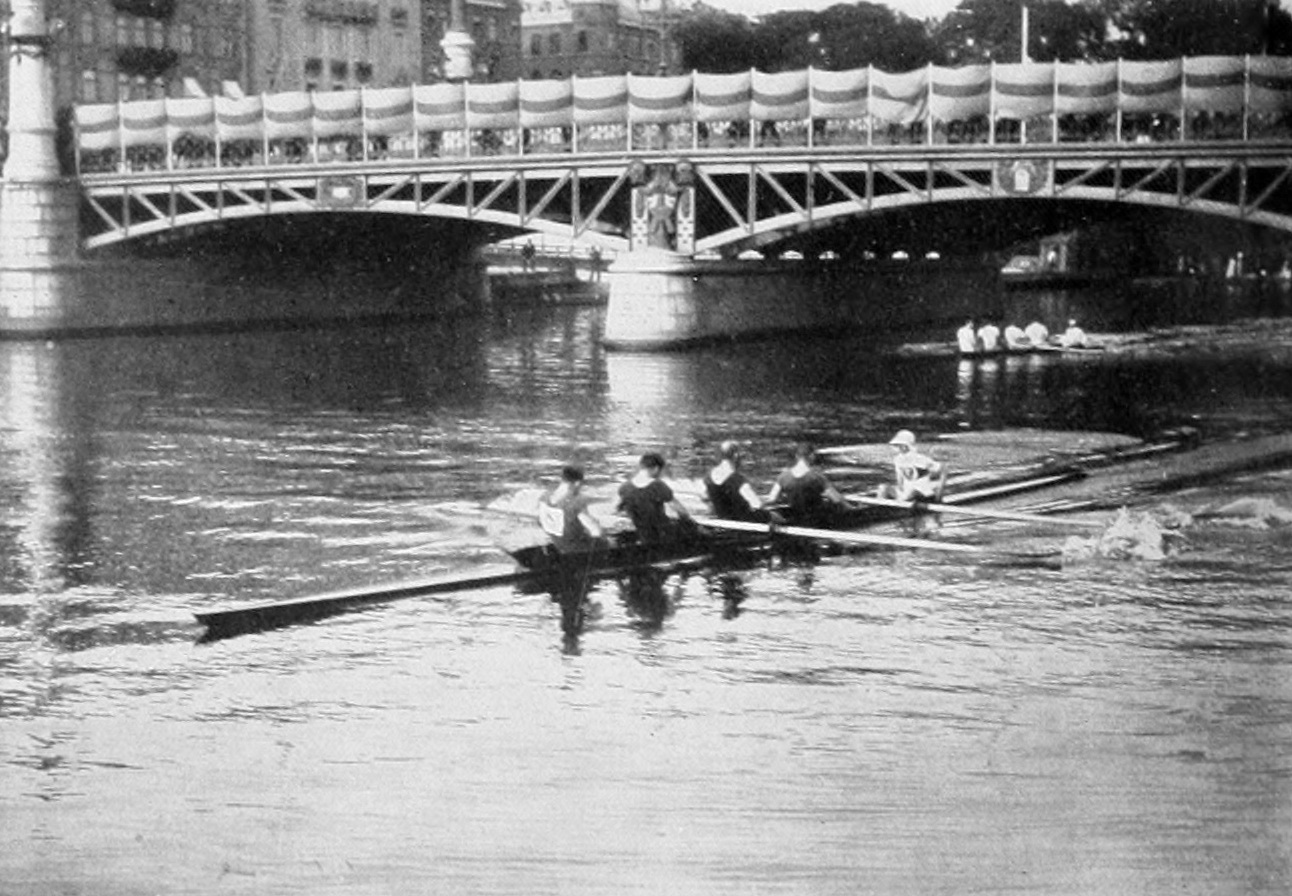
The German Ludwigshafen beating the British Thames R. C. (under the bridge) in the final

The final was held on Friday, 19 July at 5.30 p.m.

After a very energetic race up to the 500 metres mark, where the two boats still lay side by side, the Germans began to take the lead and, at the kilometre mark, Ludwigshafen were about one length ahead. Thames R. C. fought pluckily, however, and stroke Bruce Logan deserves every credit for the courageous way in which he challenged the leader. But at the Englishmen's last spurt between the bath-nouse and the bridge, it was clear that the crew was done for, while the Germans, on the other hand, rowed with still greater energy than before. Ludwigshafen won brilliantly by a good two lengths, and passed the post in excellent condition.

— Official Report, p. 671

Rank	Boat	Nation	Bow	Rower No.2	Rower No.3	Stroke	Cox	Time
1st place, gold medalist(s)	Ludwigshafener	Germany	Albert Arnheiter	Hermann Wilker	Rudolf Fickeisen	Otto Fickeisen	Otto Maier	6:59.4
2nd place, silver medalist(s)	Thames R. C.	Great Britain	Julius Beresford	Karl Vernon	Charles Rought	Bruce Logan	Geoffrey Carr	Unknown

== Sources ==
- Bergvall, Erik, ed. (1913). The Official Report of the Olympic Games of Stockholm 1912. Translated by Adams-Ray, Edward. Stockholm: Wahlström & Widstrand.
- Wudarski, Pawel (1999). "Wyniki Igrzysk Olimpijskich" (in Polish).
