= Johan Nyholm =

Finnish rower

Personal information
- Nationality: Finnish
- Born: 3 February 1881; Pirkkala, Finland
- Died: 8 April 1935 (aged 54); Helsinki, Finland

Sport
- Sport: Rowing

Johan Nyholm (3 February 1881 – 8 April 1935) was a Finnish rower. He competed in the men's coxed four event at the 1912 Summer Olympics.
