= Georges Léonet =

Belgian rower

Personal information
- Nationality: Belgian
- Born: 1892
- Died: Unknown

Sport
- Sport: Rowing

Georges Léonet (born 1892, date of death unknown) was a Belgian rower. He competed in the men's double sculls event at the 1920 Summer Olympics.
