= Larry Landrian =

Canadian rower (1894–1966)

Personal information
- Born: 30 December 1894 L'Orignal, Ontario, Canada
- Died: 19 March 1966 (aged 71) Toronto, Ontario, Canada

Sport
- Sport: Rowing

Lawrence Alfred Landrian, later Landriau (30 December 1894 – 19 March 1966), was a Canadian rower. He competed in the men's coxed four event at the 1920 Summer Olympics.
