= Theodor Schjøth =

Norwegian rower

Thomas Hammer Schlytter Schjøth, known as Theodor Schjøth (16 April 1890 – 7 November 1932), was a Norwegian competitive rower. He was born in Zhenjiang, in the Chinese province Jiangsu. He participated in coxed four at the 1912 Summer Olympics in Stockholm.
