= 1920 European Rowing Championships =

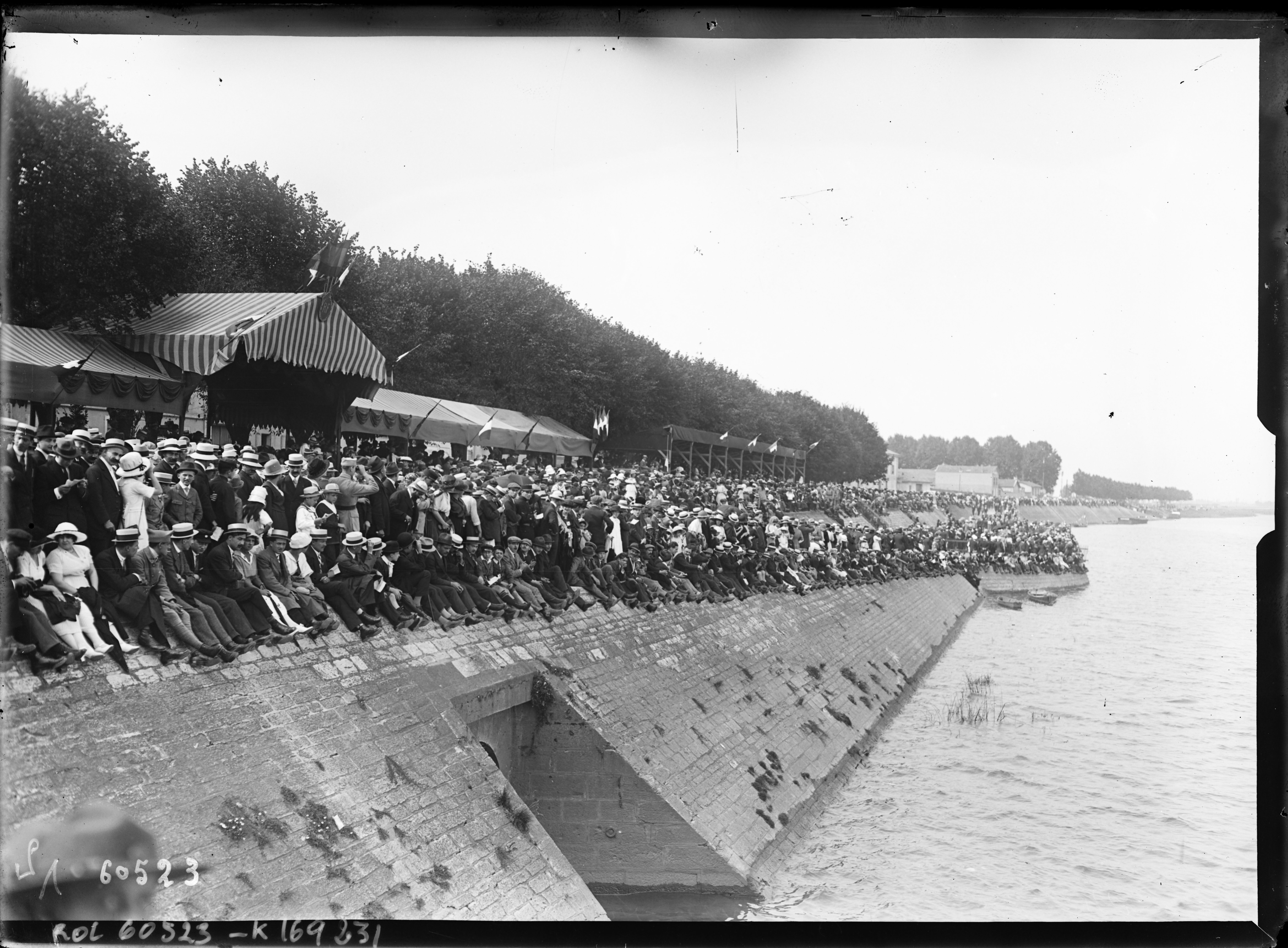
- Spectators line the shore of the Saône
- Venue: Saône
- Location: Mâcon, France
- Dates: 15 August 1920

The 1920 European Rowing Championships were rowing championships held on 15 August on the Saône in the French city Mâcon. The competition was for men only and they competed in five boat classes (M1x, M2x, M2+, M4+, M8+), the same ones as used at the 1920 Summer Olympics in Antwerp later in the same month. These were the first European Rowing Championships held after WWI; the previous championships had been held in 1913 in Ghent.

== Medal summary ==
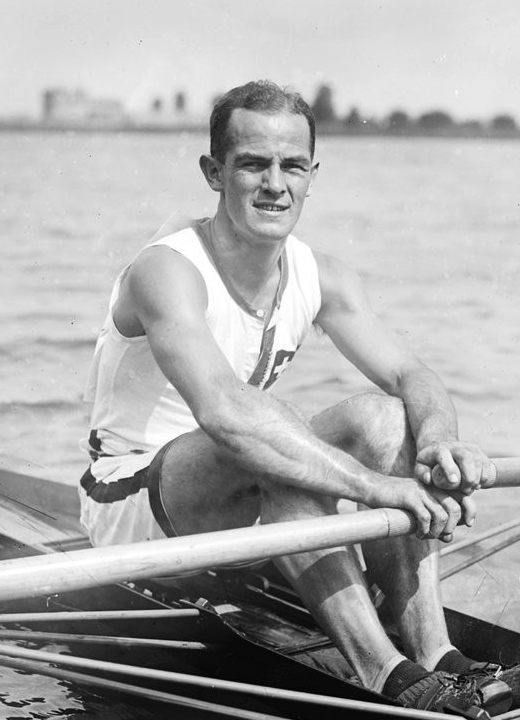
Max Schmid won the single scull

Event	Gold		Silver		Bronze	
Event	Country & rowers	Time	Country & rowers	Time	Country & rowers	Time
M1x	Switzerland; Max Schmid		Italy; Giovanni di Vaio		Belgium; Jacques Haller	
M2x	France; Alfred Plé; Gaston Giran		Switzerland; Wilhelm Walter; Karl Schöchlin		Belgium; Émile Denis; Paul Wilbrant	
M2+	France; Gabriel Poix; Maurice Monney-Bouton; Ernest Barberolle (cox)		Switzerland; Édouard Candeveau; Alfred Felber; Paul Piaget (cox)		Belgium; Georges Van Den Bossche; Oscar Van Den Bossche	
M4+	Switzerland; Hans Walter; Max Rudolf; Willy Brüderlin; Paul Rudolf; Paul Staub (cox)		Belgium; Oscar Bekaert; Adrien D'Hondt; Robert Demulder; Jean van Silfhout; Jules Van Wambeke (cox)		France	
M8+	Switzerland; Hans Walter; Max Rudolf; Willy Brüderlin; Paul Rudolf; Franz Türler; Charles Freuler; Fran Roesli; Rudolf Bosshard; Paul Staub (cox)		Belgium; Daniël Clarembaux; Jozef Hermans; Charles Lalemand; Gustave De Mulder; Félix Taymans; René Smet; Julien Crickx; Maurice Requillé		Italy; Giuseppe de Col; Michelangelo Bernasconi; Carlo Cosmati; Edoardo Natella; Paolino Porta; Ambrogio Pessina; Enzo Malinverno; Angelo Maiocchi; Plinio Urio (cox)	

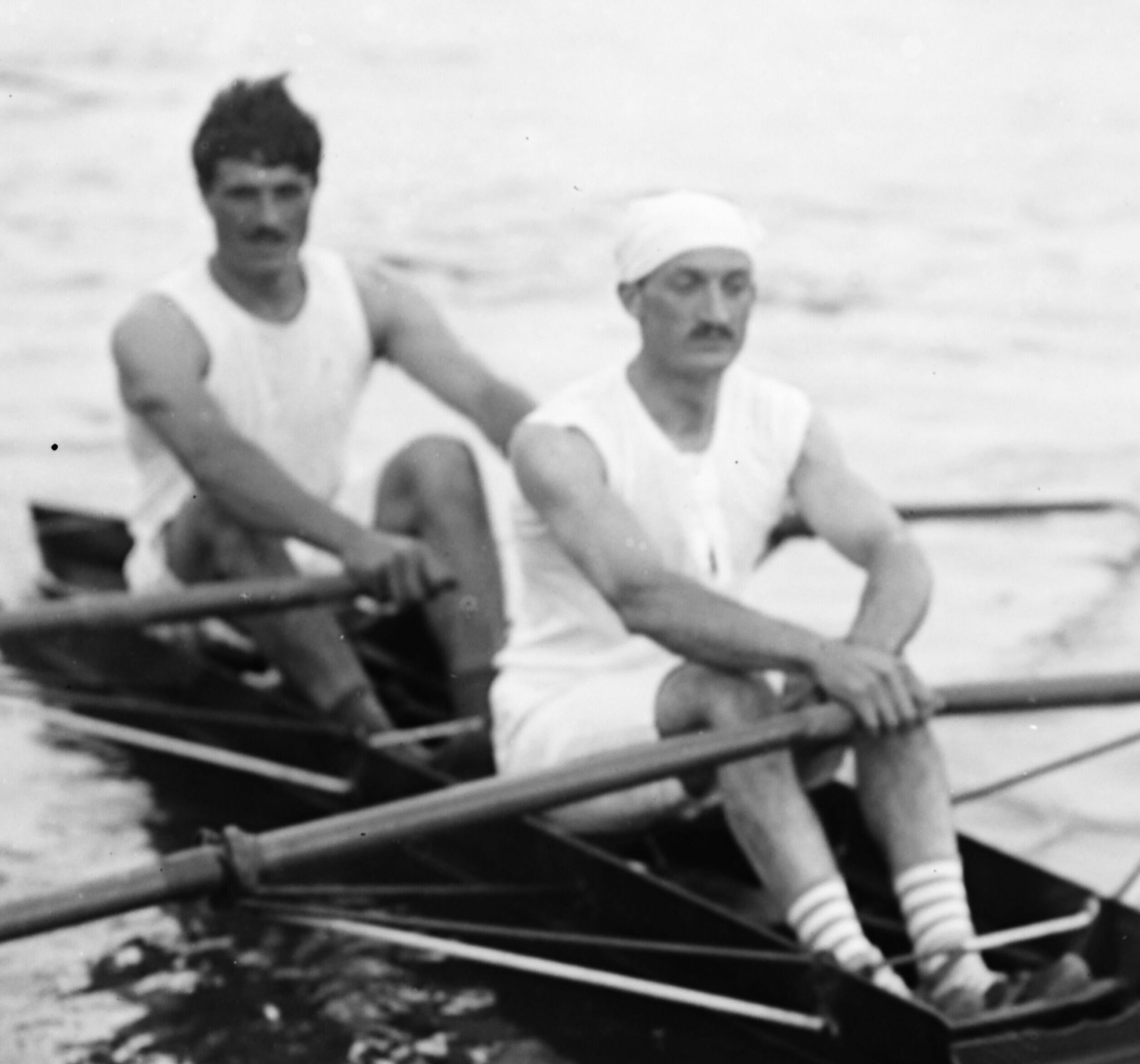
Plé and Giran won gold in the double scull

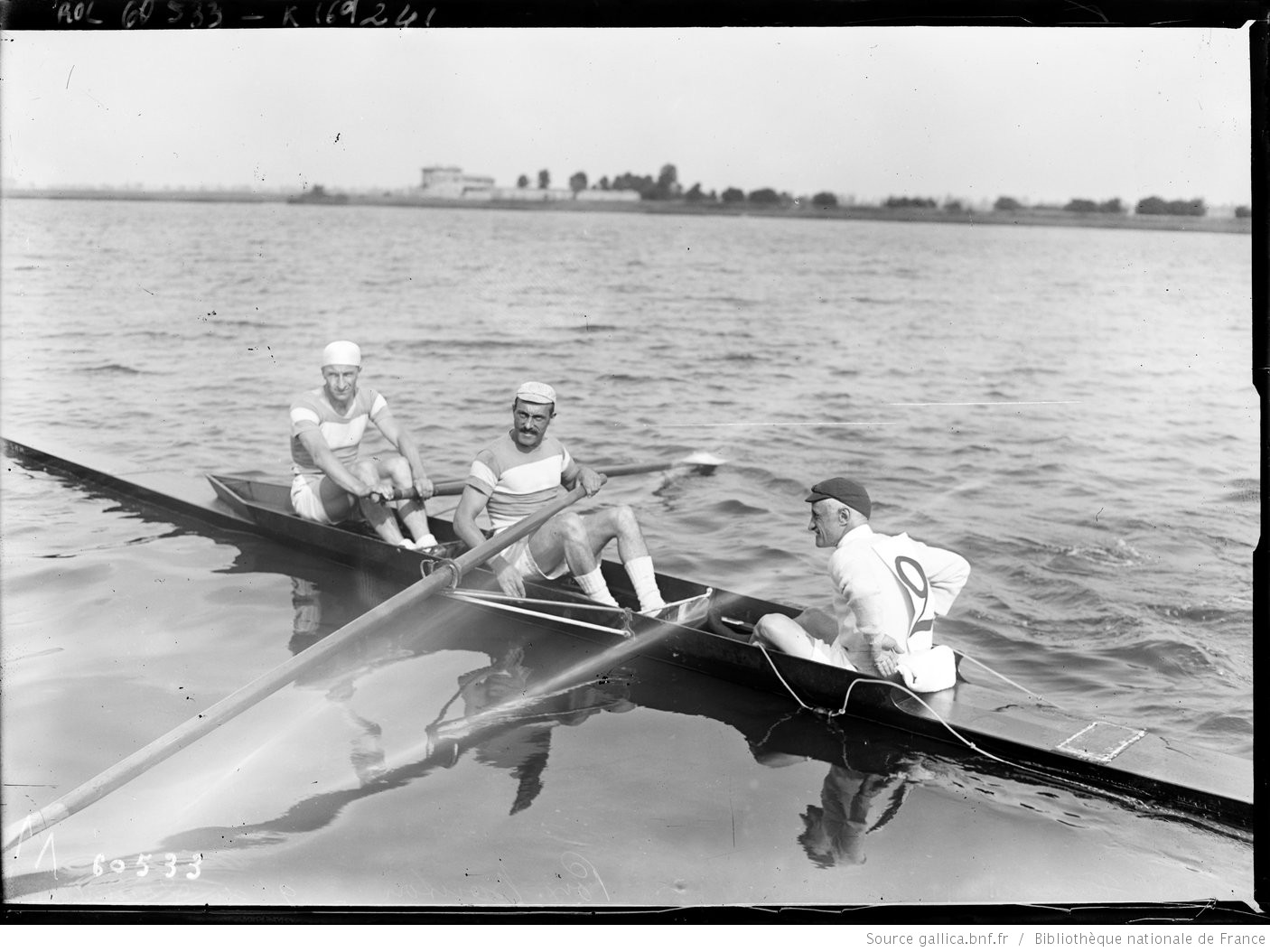
Poix, Monney-Bouton and cox Barberolle won the coxed pair

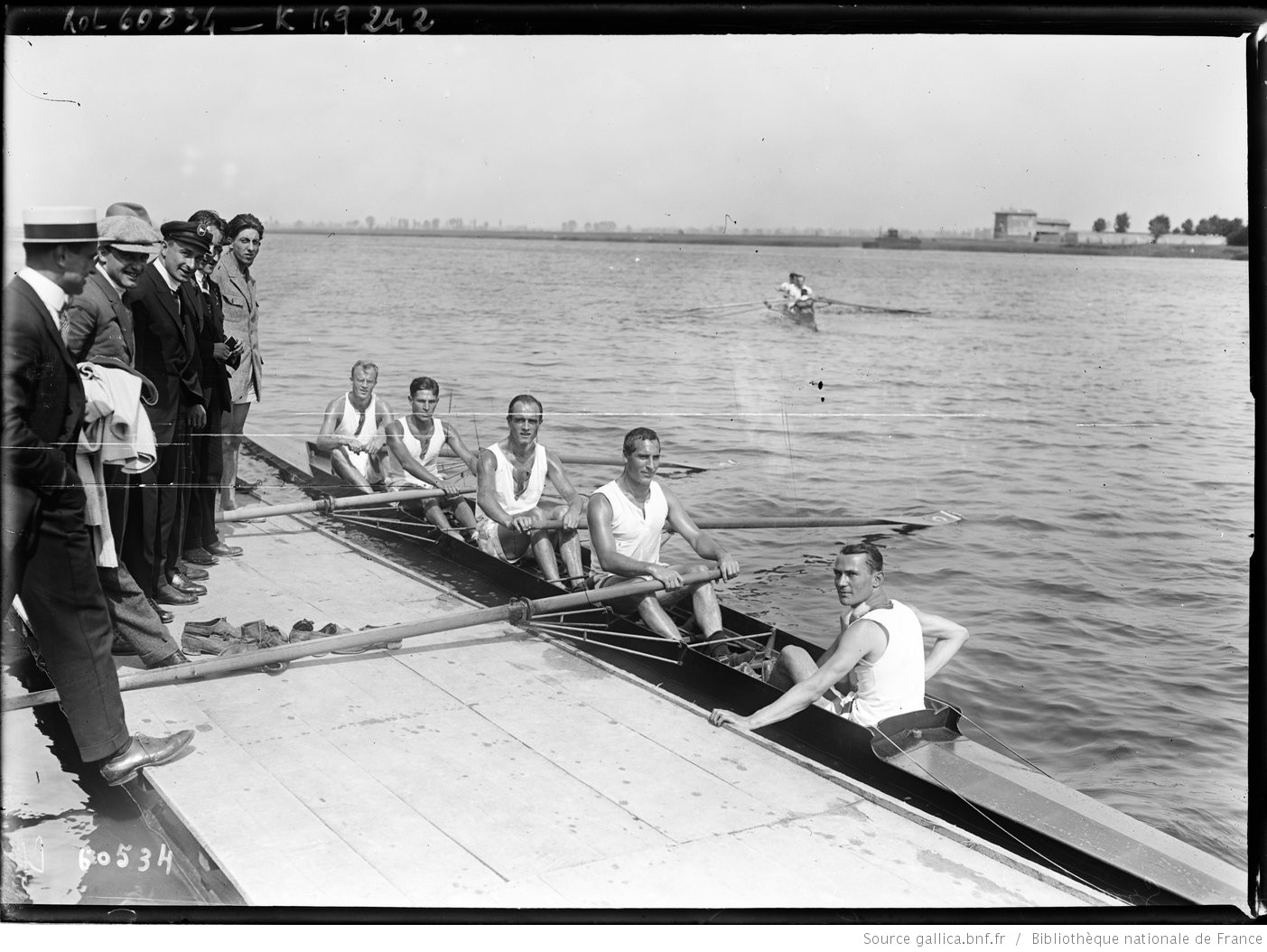
The Grasshopper Club Zürich team won the coxed four

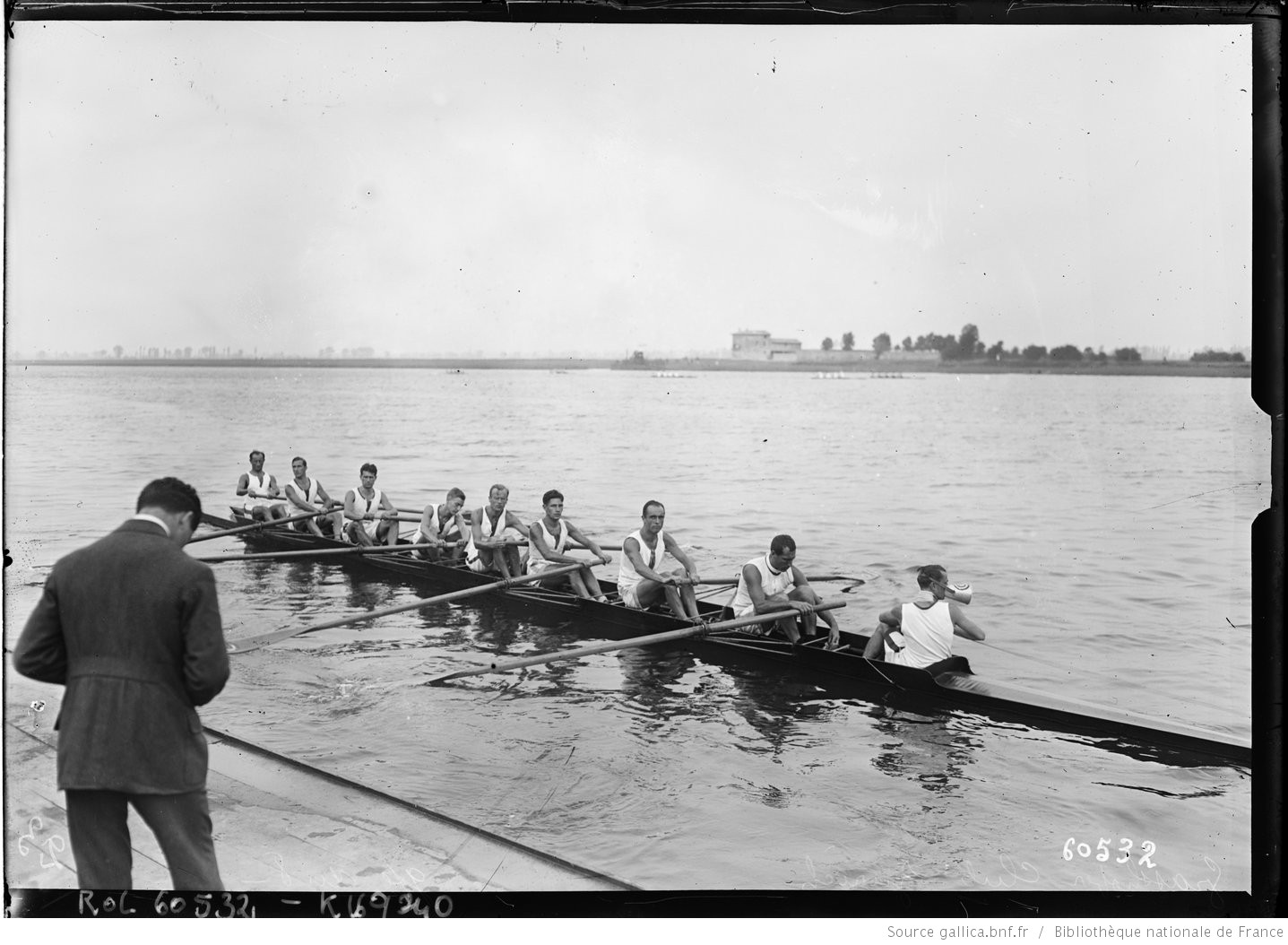
Grasshopper Club Zürich also won the eight event
