= Ernst Wetterstrand =

Swedish rower

Ernst Fridolf Wetterstrand (9 October 1887 – 21 August 1971) was a Swedish rower who competed in the 1912 Summer Olympics.

In 1912 he was a member of the Swedish boat Vaxholm which was eliminated in the first round of the coxed four competition.
