= Ejgil Clemmensen =

Danish coxswain

Olympic medal record

Men's rowing
Bronze medal – third place	1912 Stockholm	Men's coxed four

Ejgil Becker Clemmensen (21 June 1890 – 24 October 1932) was a Danish rowing coxswain who competed in the 1912 Summer Olympics.

He was the coxswain of the Danish boat, which won the bronze medal in the coxed four.
