= Paul Staub =

Swiss rowing cox

Personal information
- Born: unknown
- Died: unknown

Sport
- Sport: Rowing
- Club: Grasshopper Club Zürich
Medal record
Men's rowing
Representing Switzerland
Olympic Games
Gold medal – first place	1920 Antwerp	Coxed four
European Rowing Championships
Gold medal – first place	1920 Mâcon	Coxed four

Paul Staub was a Swiss coxswain who competed in the 1920 Summer Olympics and was the part of the Swiss Team which won a gold medal in 1920 Antwerp in coxed four.
