= Albert Arnheiter =

German rower

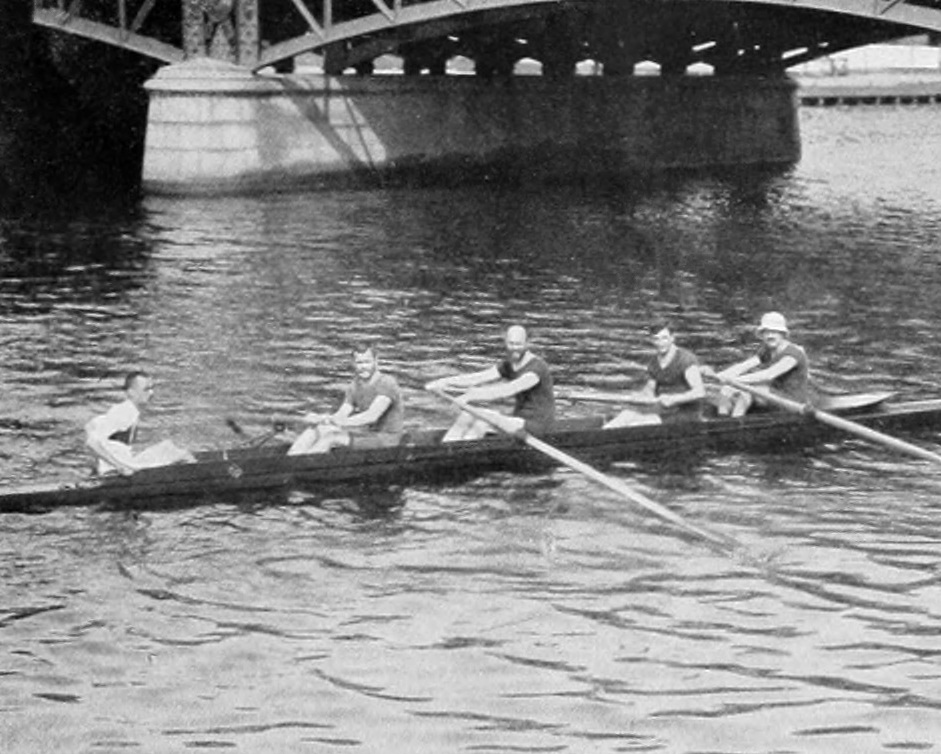
- Arnheiter at the 1912 Olympics

Personal information
- Born: 20 July 1890 Ludwigshafen, German Empire
- Died: 26 April 1945 (aged 54) Casalpusterlengo, Italy
Medal record
Men's rowing
Representing Germany
Olympic Games
Gold medal – first place	1912 Stockholm	Men's coxed four

Albert Arnheiter (20 July 1890 – 26 April 1945) was a German rower who competed in the 1912 Summer Olympics. He was the bowman of the German boat which won the gold medal in the coxed fours. He was killed towards the end of World War II in Italy.
