= Jaroslav Oplt =

Czechoslovak rower

Personal information
- Nationality: Czech

Sport
- Sport: Rowing

Jaroslav Oplt was a Czechoslovak rower. He competed in the men's coxed four event at the 1920 Summer Olympics.
