= Rasmus Frandsen =

Danish rower

Olympic medal record

Men's rowing
Bronze medal – third place	1912 Stockholm	Men's coxed four

Rasmus Peter Frandsen (17 April 1886 in Årslev, Denmark – 5 December 1974 in Næstved, Denmark) was a Danish rower who competed in the 1912 Summer Olympics. He was a crew member of the Danish boat, which won the bronze medal in the coxed fours.
