= Hans Walter =

Swiss rower

Personal information
- Born: 9 August 1889
- Died: 14 January 1967 (aged 77) Stansstad, Switzerland

Sport
- Sport: Rowing
- Club: Grasshopper Club Zürich; RC Lausanne
Medal record
Men's rowing
Representing Switzerland
Olympic Games
Gold medal – first place	1920 Antwerp	Coxed four
Gold medal – first place	1924 Paris	Coxed four
Bronze medal – third place	1924 Paris	Coxless four
European Rowing Championships
Gold medal – first place	1911 Como	Coxed four
Silver medal – second place	1911 Como	Eight
Silver medal – second place	1912 Geneva	Double scull
Gold medal – first place	1912 Geneva	Coxed four
Gold medal – first place	1912 Geneva	Eight
Gold medal – first place	1913 Ghent	Coxed four
Silver medal – second place	1913 Ghent	Eight
Gold medal – first place	1920 Mâcon	Coxed four
Gold medal – first place	1920 Mâcon	Eight

Hans Walter (9 August 1889 – 14 January 1967) was a Swiss rower who competed in the 1920 Summer Olympics and in the 1924 Summer Olympics.

In 1920 he was part of the Swiss boat, which won the gold medal in the coxed four event. He was also a member of the Swiss eights which was eliminated in the first round of the eight competition. Four years later he won the gold medal as part of the Swiss boat in the coxed fours competition again. He also competed with the Swiss team in the coxless fours event and won the bronze medal.
