= André Mirambeau =

French rower

Personal information
- Nationality: French
- Born: 8 November 1878; Castellane, France
- Died: 20 September 1932 (aged 53)

Sport
- Sport: Rowing

André Mirambeau (8 November 1878 – 20 September 1932) was a French rower. He competed in the men's coxed four event at the 1912 Summer Olympics.
