= Jindřich Mulač =

Czechoslovak rower

Personal information
- Nationality: Czech
- Born: 23 August 1895 Prague, Austria-Hungary

Sport
- Sport: Rowing

Jindřich Mulač (born 23 August 1895) was a Czechoslovak rower. He competed in the men's coxed four event at the 1920 Summer Olympics.
