= Georges Van Den Bossche =

Belgian rower

Personal information
- Born: 15 July 1892 Ghent, Belgium
- Died: 16 May 1966 (aged 73) Ghent, Belgium

Sport
- Sport: Rowing
- Club: KRSG, Gent
Medal record
Men's rowing
Representing Belgium
European Rowing Championships
| Gold medal – first place | 1910 Ostend | Eight |
| Silver medal – second place | 1912 Geneva | Coxed four |
| Bronze medal – third place | 1920 Mâcon | Coxed pair |

Georges Van Den Bossche (15 July 1892 – 16 May 1966) was a Belgian rower. He competed at the 1912 Summer Olympics in Stockholm with the men's coxed four where they were eliminated at the quarter-finals and at the 1920 Summer Olympics in Antwerp with the men's coxed pair where he together with his brother Oscar was eliminated in round one.
