= 1912 European Rowing Championships =

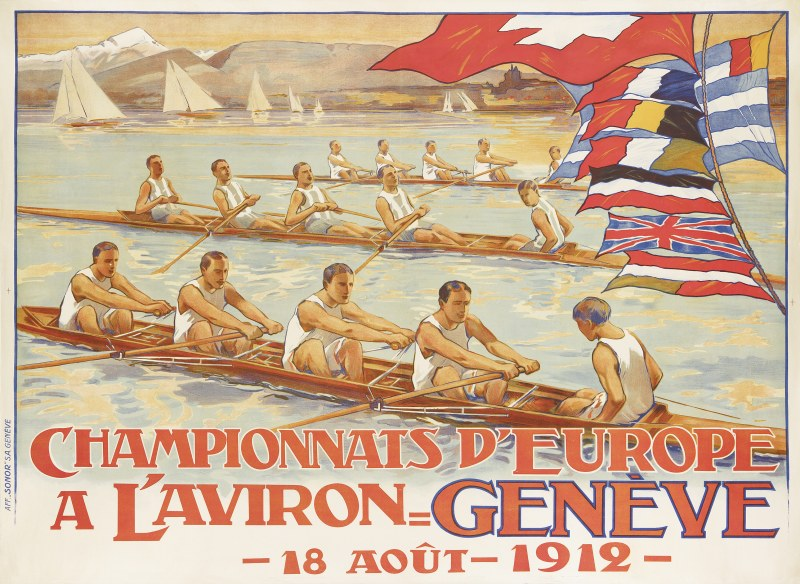
- Poster advertising the 1912 Championships
- Venue: Lake Geneva
- Location: Geneva, Switzerland
- Dates: 18 August 1912

The 1912 European Rowing Championships were rowing championships held on Lake Geneva in the Swiss city of Geneva. The competition was for men only and they competed in five boat classes (M1x, M2x, M2+, M4+, M8+). The 1912 Olympic rowing competition had been held a month earlier in Stockholm, Sweden.

== Medal summary ==
Event	Gold		Silver		Bronze	
Event	Country & rowers	Time	Country & rowers	Time	Country & rowers	Time
M1x	Belgium; Polydore Veirman		Italy; Giuseppe Sinigaglia		Switzerland; Philippe Pettmann	
M2x	Italy; Erminio Dones; Pietro Annoni		Switzerland; Paul Schmid; Hans Walter		France	
M2+	Switzerland; Charles Holzmann; Alfred Felber; Albert Riotton (cox)		France; R. Testut; F. Morel; P. Thivans (cox)		Italy; Franco Gianolio; Giorgio Lajolo; M. Charvet (cox)	
M4+	Switzerland; Hans Walter; Max Rudolf; Paul Schmid; Walter Schoeller; Charles Muhr (cox)		Belgium; Guillaume Visser; Georges Van Den Bossche; Edmond Vanwaes; Georges Willems; Léonard Nuytens (cox)		Italy; Emilio Lucca; Enrivo Marinoni; Nino Torlaschi; Felice Monza; Plinio Urio (cox)	
M8+	Switzerland; Hans Walter; Max Rudolf; Paul Schmid; Walter Schoeller; Georges Thoma; Paul Rudolf; F. Bon; James Schmid; Charles Muhr (cox)		Italy; Emilio Lucca; Enrico Marinoni; Ettore Lucioni; Antonio Corticelli; Giuseppe Sinigaglia; Orlando Pontiggia; Nino Torlaschi; Felice Monza; Plinio Urio (cox)		France; J.C. Hoveman; R. Fellonneau; P. Rueguera; Alexandre Herceg Murat; R. Regnault; Ch. Rueguera; H. Fellonneau; R. Paul; Hervez (cox)	
