= Øyvin Davidsen =

Norwegian rower

Personal information
- Nationality: Norwegian
- Born: 1 September 1891 Oslo, Norway
- Died: 6 June 1976 (aged 84) Oslo, Norway

Sport
- Sport: Rowing

Øyvin Davidsen (1 September 1891 – 6 June 1976) was a Norwegian rower. He competed in the men's coxed four event at the 1912 Summer Olympics.
