= Gösta Eriksson (rowing) =

Swedish rowing cox

Personal information
- Birth name: Gösta Vilhelm Eriksson
- Born: 19 July 1900; Vaxholm, Sweden
- Died: 7 April 1970 (aged 69); Vaxholm, Sweden
- Relatives: Axel Eriksson (brother)

Sport
- Sport: Rowing
- Club: Vaxholms RF

Gösta Vilhelm Eriksson (19 July 1900 – 7 April 1970) was a Swedish rowing coxswain who competed in the 1920 Summer Olympics.

He was born and died in Vaxholm. In 1920 he was the coxswain of the Swedish boat which was eliminated in the first round of the coxed four event. His elder brother Axel Eriksson competed in the same boat.
