= Erich Federschmidt =

American rower (1895–1962)

Olympic medal record

Men's rowing
Silver medal – second place	1920 Antwerp	Coxed four

Erich Herman Federschmidt (June 14, 1895 – February 24, 1962) was an American rower who competed in the 1920 Summer Olympics. He died in Martin County, Florida. In 1920 he was part of the American boat, which won the silver medal in the coxed fours event.
