= Hans Jørgensen (rower) =

Danish rower (1889–1955)

Personal information
- Full name: Marius Hans Jørgensen
- Nationality: Danish
- Born: 25 December 1899 Nyborg, Denmark
- Died: 22 April 1955 (aged 55) Copenhagen, Denmark

Sport
- Sport: Rowing

Marius Hans Jørgensen (25 December 1889 – 22 April 1955) was a Danish rower. He competed in the men's coxed four event at the 1912 Summer Olympics.
