= Ernesto Flores Filho =

Brazilian rower

Personal information
- Nationality: Brazilian
- Born: 2 August 1889
- Died: 22 December 1926 (aged 37)

Sport
- Sport: Rowing

Ernesto Flores Filho (2 August 1889 – 22 December 1926) was a Brazilian rowing coxswain. He competed in the men's coxed four event at the 1920 Summer Olympics.
