= Otto Maier (rowing) =

German rowing coxswain

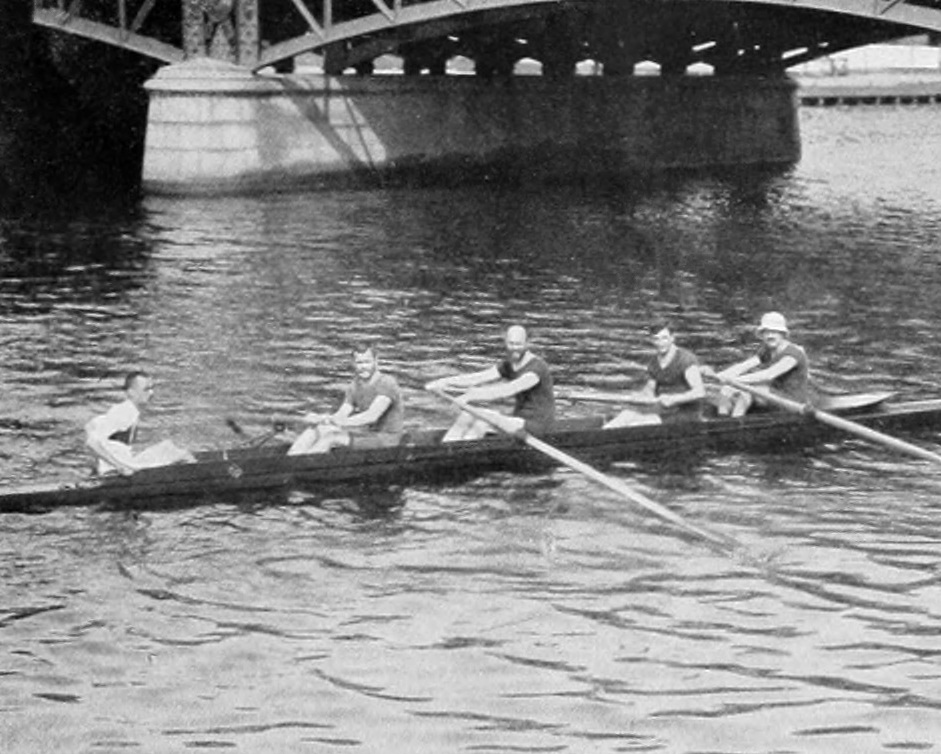
Otto Maier (leftmost) at the 1912 Olympics

Otto Maier (23 December 1887 – 29 May 1957) was a German rowing coxswain who competed in the 1912 Summer Olympics.

He was the coxswain of the German boat, which won the gold medal in the coxed four event. For this competition there are two coxswains reported. Maier and Karl Leister are known to have competed, but it is not known who participated in the final. However, the IOC medal database credits the gold medal to Karl Leister.
