= Poul Thymann =

Danish rower

Olympic medal record

Men's rowing
Bronze medal – third place	1912 Stockholm	Men's coxed four

Poul Thymann (10 May 1888 in Kalvehave, near Vordingborg, Denmark – 12 October 1971 in Gentofte, Denmark) was a Danish rower who competed in the 1912 Summer Olympics. He was the strokeman of the Danish boat, which won the bronze medal in the coxed fours.
