= Alcides Veira =

Brazilian rower

Personal information
- Full name: Alcides Short Veira
- Nationality: Brazilian
- Born: 1877
- Died: Unknown

Sport
- Sport: Rowing

Alcides Short Veira (born 1877, date of death unknown) was a Brazilian rower. He competed in the men's coxed four event at the 1920 Summer Olympics.
