= Einar Eriksen (rowing) =

Norwegian coxswain

Personal information
- Nationality: Norwegian
- Born: 3 March 1880; Trondheim, Norway
- Died: 15 July 1965 (aged 85); Oslo, Norway
- Relatives: Bjarne Eriksen (brother)

Sport
- Sport: Rowing

Einar Eriksen (3 March 1880 – 15 July 1965) was a Norwegian rowing coxswain. He competed in the men's coxed four event at the 1912 Summer Olympics. His brother Bjarne competed at the same Olympics in fencing.
