= Harold Harcourt =

Canadian rower

Personal information
- Born: 5 July 1896; Toronto, Ontario, Canada
- Died: 17 December 1970 (aged 74); Toronto, Ontario, Canada

Sport
- Sport: Rowing
- Club: Argonaut Rowing Club

Harold Turner Harcourt (5 July 1896 – 17 December 1970) was a Canadian rower. He competed in the men's coxed four event at the 1920 Summer Olympics.
