= Charles Freuler =

Swiss rower

Personal information
- Born: unknown
- Died: unknown

Sport
- Sport: Rowing
Medal record
Men's rowing
Representing Switzerland
European Rowing Championships
Gold medal – first place	1920 Mâcon	Eight

Charles Freuler was a Swiss rower. He competed at the 1920 Summer Olympics in Antwerp with the men's eight where they were eliminated in round one.
