= Erik Bisgaard =

Danish rower

Olympic medal record

Men's rowing
Bronze medal – third place	1912 Stockholm	Men's coxed four

Erik Bisgaard (25 January 1890 in Silkeborg, Denmark – 21 June 1987 in Buenos Aires, Argentina) was a Danish rower who competed in the 1912 Summer Olympics.

He was a crew member of the Danish boat, which won the bronze medal in the coxed fours. Erik Bisgaard later became a renowned ambassador for the sport of rowing in South America. Prior to the outbreak of the First World War, Bisgaard left Denmark for Buenos Aires, Argentina, where he worked as an architect and engineer until he died in 1987. Erik Bisgaard's Great-Grandson is Roddy Bisgaard Lanigan, a scholastic rowing champion in the United States.

In Buenos Aires, Erik became a member of the Club Remeros Escandinavos (Scandinavian Rowing Club) in Tigre. This club was founded only a few years before Erik migrated to Argentina, in 1912, coincidently the same year Erik participated in the Stockholm Summer Olympics and obtained his bronze medal.

Erik was an advanced lightweight sculler in an era when sweep rowing was exponentially more popular. However, he managed to position himself among the best of his time, winning many regattas between 1914 and the 1920s.
