= 1921 European Rowing Championships =

- Venue: Amstel
- Location: Amsterdam, Netherlands
- Dates: 9–11 September 1921

The 1921 European Rowing Championships were rowing championships held on the Amstel in the Dutch capital city Amsterdam from 9 to 11 September. The competition was for men only and they competed in five boat classes (M1x, M2x, M2+, M4+, M8+), the same ones as had been used at the 1920 Summer Olympics in Antwerp.

== Medal summary ==
Video footage from the Amsterdam regatta (6:28 min)

Event	Gold		Silver		Bronze	
Event	Country & rowers	Time	Country & rowers	Time	Country & rowers	Time
M1x	Netherlands; Frits Eijken		Italy; Nino Castellani			
M2x	Netherlands; Constant Pieterse; C.H.J. Schleicher		Belgium; Lucien Brouha; Jules George			
M2+	Belgium; Marcel Roman; Roger Legrand; Georges Anthony (cox)		France		Netherlands; Johannes van der Vegte; Bernard te Hennepe; C.A. van Es (cox)	
M4+	Switzerland; Willy Brüderlin; Max Rudolf; Émile Albrecht; Paul Rudolf		France		Netherlands; F.W. Boers; J. van Holst Pellikaan; P.L. van Baren; C. Gisbel; J.A. Meurex (cox)	
M8+	Switzerland; Willy Brüderlin; Max Rudolf; Émile Albrecht; Paul Rudolf; Heini Thoma; Alexander Thiedemann; E. Binkert; Ferdinand Lecomte; A. Wolf (cox)		Hungary; H. István Keresztes; László Józsa; Károly Jesze; Lajos Wick; Kálmán Jesze; István Szendeffy; Sándor Hautzinger; Ferenc Kirchknopf; Károly Koch (cox)		Belgium; Jacques Haller; Léon Vleurinck; Robert Libaert; Auguste Hoefman; Oscar Bekaert; Adrien D'Hondt; Robert De Mulder; Jean van Silfhout; Jules van Wambeke (cox)	
