= Maurice Requillé =

Belgian rower

Personal information
- Born: unknown
- Died: unknown

Sport
- Sport: Rowing
- Club: CRB, Bruxelles
Medal record
Men's rowing
Representing Belgium
European Rowing Championships
Silver medal – second place	1920 Mâcon	Eight

Maurice Requillé was a Belgian rower. He competed at the 1920 Summer Olympics in Antwerp with the men's eight where they were eliminated in round one.
