= Ernest Sadzawka =

Belgian rower

Personal information
- Full name: Ernest Leon Sadzawka
- Nationality: Belgian
- Born: 24 March 1890; Sint-Joost-ten-Node
- Died: 5 April 1960 (aged 70); Ukkel

Sport
- Sport: Rowing

Ernest Sadzawka (24 March 1890 – 5 April 1960) was a Belgian rower. He competed in the men's double sculls event at the 1920 Summer Olympics.
