= Robert De Mulder =

Belgian rower

Personal information
- Born: Robert Camille Clément De Mulder; 16 October 1900 Ghent, Belgium
- Died: 16 June 1967 (aged 66) Knokke, Belgium

Sport
- Sport: Rowing
- Club: Royal Club Nautique de Gand
Medal record
Men's rowing
Representing Belgium
European Rowing Championships
| Silver medal – second place | 1920 Mâcon | Coxed four |
| Bronze medal – third place | 1921 Amsterdam | Eight |

Robert Camille Clément De Mulder (16 October 1900 – 16 June 1967) was a Belgian rower. He competed at the 1920 Summer Olympics in Antwerp with the men's coxed four where they were eliminated in round one.
