= Mikael Simonsen =

Danish rower (1882–1950)

Olympic medal record

Men's rowing
Bronze medal – third place	1912 Stockholm	Coxed four

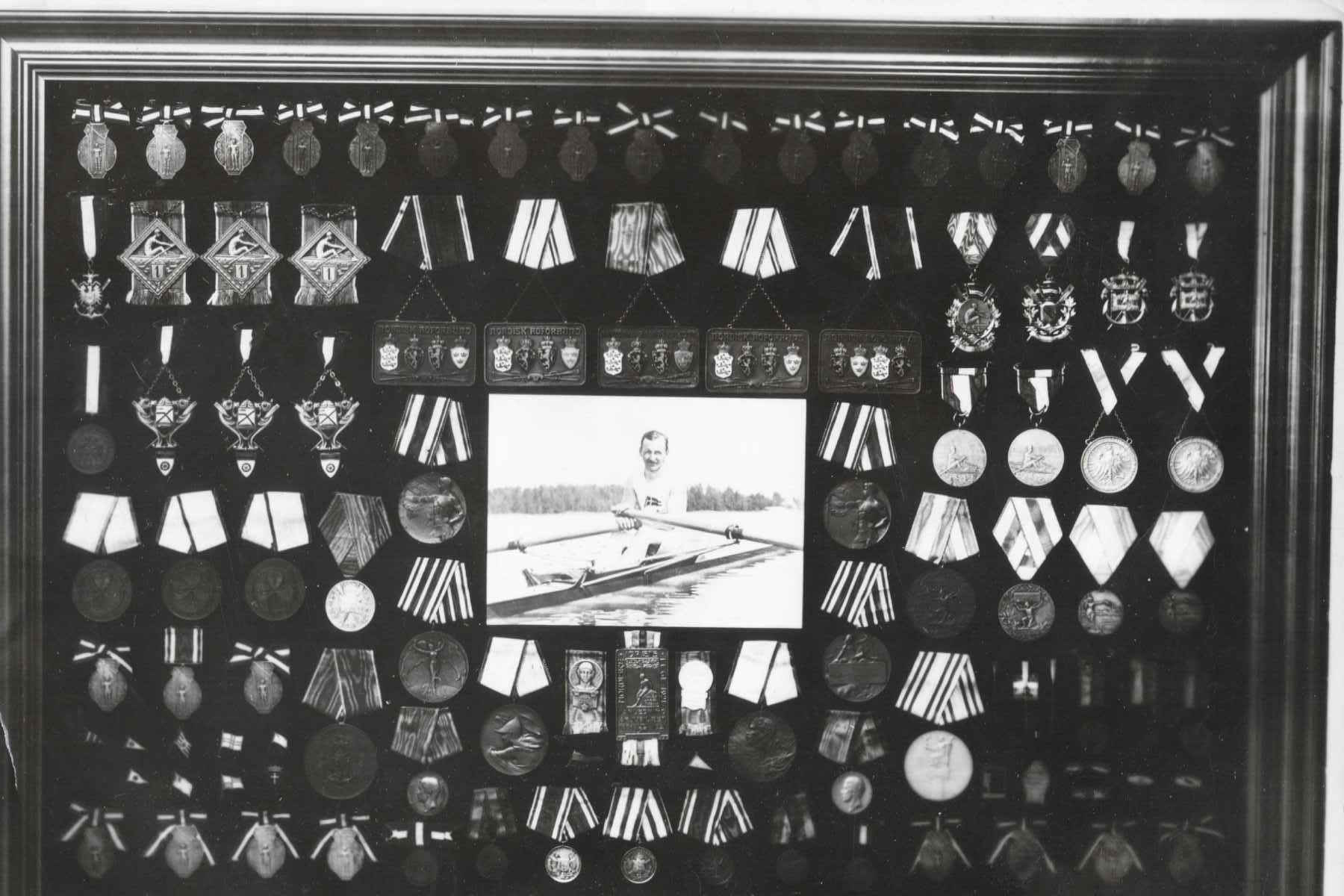
Medals displayed at Aarhus Roklub, Aarhus Denmark until it disappeared sometime in the 1970s.

Mikael Simonsen (20 November 1882 in Løgstør, Denmark – 29 March 1950 in Århus, Denmark) was a Danish rower who competed in the 1912 Summer Olympics. He was a crew member of the Danish boat, which won the bronze medal in the coxed four. Amongst many other rowing accomplishments, he also won Single Scull at the Baltic Games (Baltiska Spelen) 1914 in Mamloe, Sweden.
