= Jiří Wihan =

Czechoslovak rower

Personal information
- Nationality: Czech
- Born: 1889
- Died: December 1972 (aged 82–83)

Sport
- Sport: Rowing

Jiří Wihan (1889 – December 1972) was a Czechoslovak rower. He competed in the men's coxed four event at the 1920 Summer Olympics.
