= Adrien D'Hondt =

Belgian rower

Personal information
- Born: unknown
- Died: unknown

Sport
- Sport: Rowing
- Club: Royal Club Nautique de Gand
Medal record
Men's rowing
Representing Belgium
European Rowing Championships
Silver medal – second place	1920 Mâcon	Coxed four
Bronze medal – third place	1921 Amsterdam	Eight

Adrien D'Hondt was a Belgian rower. He competed at the 1920 Summer Olympics in Antwerp with the men's coxed four where they were eliminated in round one.
