= John Lager =

Swedish rower

John Gustaf Lager (1 March 1887 – 17 February 1961) was a Swedish rower who competed in the 1912 Summer Olympics and in the 1920 Summer Olympics.

In 1912, he was a member of the Swedish boat Vaxholm, which was eliminated in the first round of the coxed four competition. Eight years later, he was part of the Swedish boat, which was eliminated in the first round of the coxed four event. He rowed with his brother Gunnar.
