= Per Gulbrandsen =

Norwegian rower

Olympic medal record

Men's rowing
Bronze medal – third place	1920 Antwerp	Coxed four

Per Ziegler Gulbrandsen (18 July 1897 – 2 November 1963) was a Norwegian rower who competed in the 1920 Summer Olympics. In 1920, he won the bronze medal as a crew member of the Norwegian boat in the coxed fours competition.
