= Max Rudolf (rower) =

Swiss rower

Personal information
- Born: 12 February 1891
- Died: unknown
- Relatives: Paul Rudolf (brother)

Sport
- Sport: Rowing
- Club: Grasshopper Club Zürich
Medal record
Men's rowing
Representing Switzerland
Olympic Games
Gold medal – first place	1920 Antwerp	Coxed four
European Rowing Championships
Silver medal – second place	1911 Como	Eight
Gold medal – first place	1912 Geneva	Coxed four
Gold medal – first place	1912 Geneva	Eight
Gold medal – first place	1913 Ghent	Coxed four
Silver medal – second place	1913 Ghent	Eight
Gold medal – first place	1920 Mâcon	Coxed four
Gold medal – first place	1920 Mâcon	Eight
Gold medal – first place	1921 Amsterdam	Coxed four
Gold medal – first place	1921 Amsterdam	Eight

Max Rudolf (born 12 February 1891, date of death unknown) was a Swiss rower who competed in the 1920 Summer Olympics.

In 1920 he was part of the Swiss boat, which won the gold medal in the coxed four event. He was also a member of the Swiss eight which was eliminated in the first round of the eight competition.
