= Theodor Klem =

Norwegian rower (1889–1963)

Olympic medal record

Men's rowing
Bronze medal – third place	1920 Antwerp	Coxed four

Theodor "Thea" Klem (20 January 1889 – 15 July 1963) was a Norwegian rower who competed in the 1912 Summer Olympics and in the 1920 Summer Olympics.

In 1912, he was a crew member of the Norwegian boat, which was eliminated in the semi-finals of the coxed four event. In some sources, the crew members of this boat are also listed as bronze medalists. Eight years later, he won the bronze medal with the Norwegian boat.
