= Karl Sundholm =

Swedish rower

Karl Ludvig Sundholm (20 March 1885 – 11 March 1955) was a Swedish rowing coxswain who competed in the 1912 Summer Olympics.

In 1912 he was the coxswain of the Swedish boat Vaxholm which was eliminated in the first round of the coxed four competition.
