= Birger Var =

Norwegian rower

Olympic medal record

Men's rowing
Bronze medal – third place	1920 Antwerp	Coxed four

Birger Var (30 June 1893 – 22 May 1970) was a Norwegian rower who competed in the 1920 Summer Olympics. In 1920, he won the bronze medal as a crew member of the Norwegian boat in the coxed fours competition.
