= Paul Rudolf (rower) =

Swiss rower (1892–1956)

Personal information
- Born: Paul F. Rudolf; 6 December 1892
- Died: 5 April 1956 (aged 63)
- Relatives: Max Rudolf (brother)

Sport
- Sport: Rowing
- Club: Grasshopper Club Zürich
Medal record
Men's rowing
Representing Switzerland
Olympic Games
Gold medal – first place	1920 Antwerp	Coxed four
European Rowing Championships
Gold medal – first place	1912 Geneva	Eight
Gold medal – first place	1920 Mâcon	Coxed four
Gold medal – first place	1920 Mâcon	Eight
Gold medal – first place	1921 Amsterdam	Coxed four
Gold medal – first place	1921 Amsterdam	Eight

Paul F. Rudolf (6 December 1892 – 5 April 1956) was a Swiss rower who competed in the 1920 Summer Olympics. In 1920 he was part of the Swiss boat, which won the gold medal in the coxed fours event. He was also a member of the Swiss eights which was eliminated in the first round of the eight competition.
