= Laggers Point =

Headland in New South Wales

Coordinates: 30°52′S 153°04′E

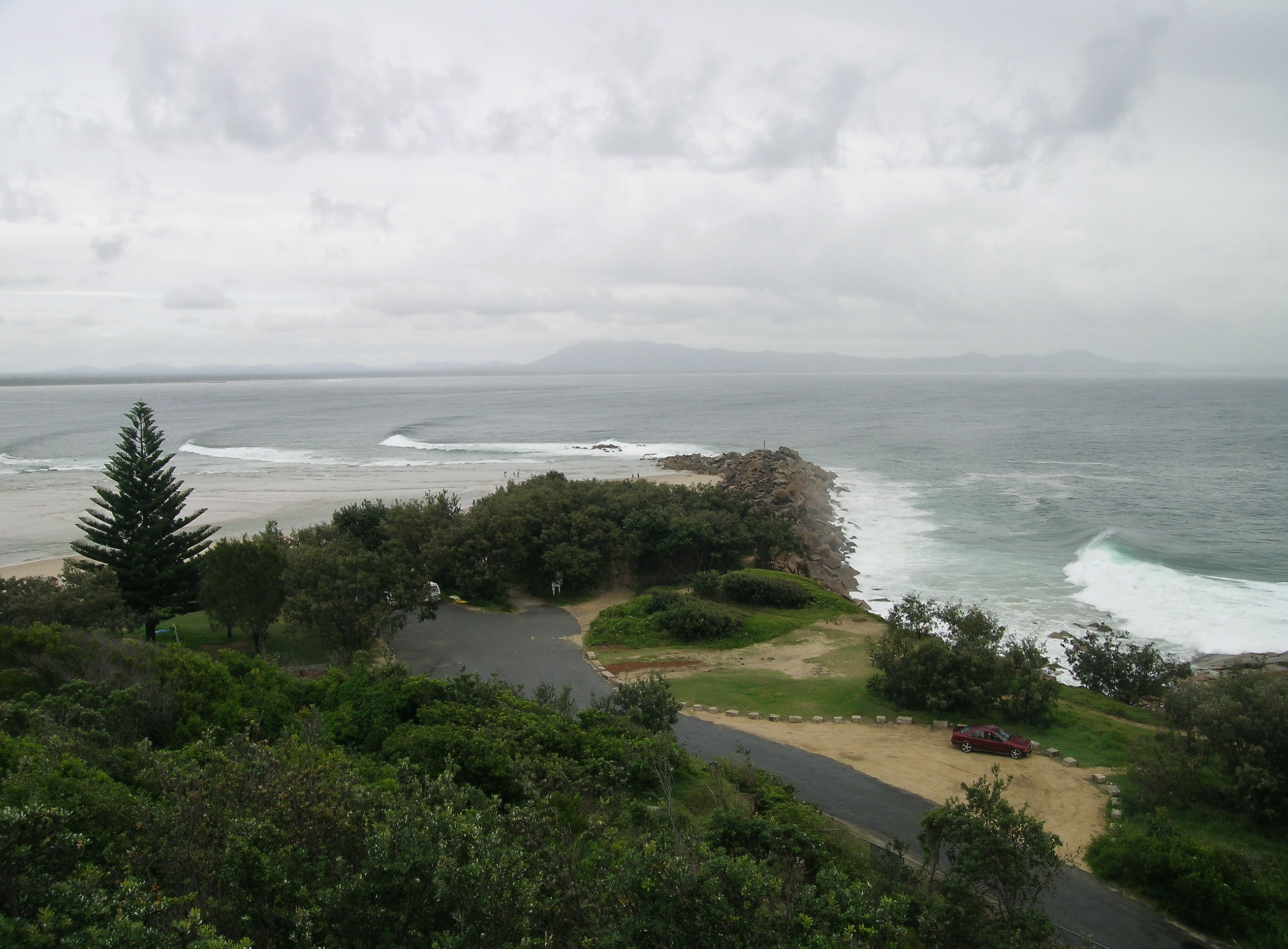
Laggers Point from Trial Bay Gaol, NSW

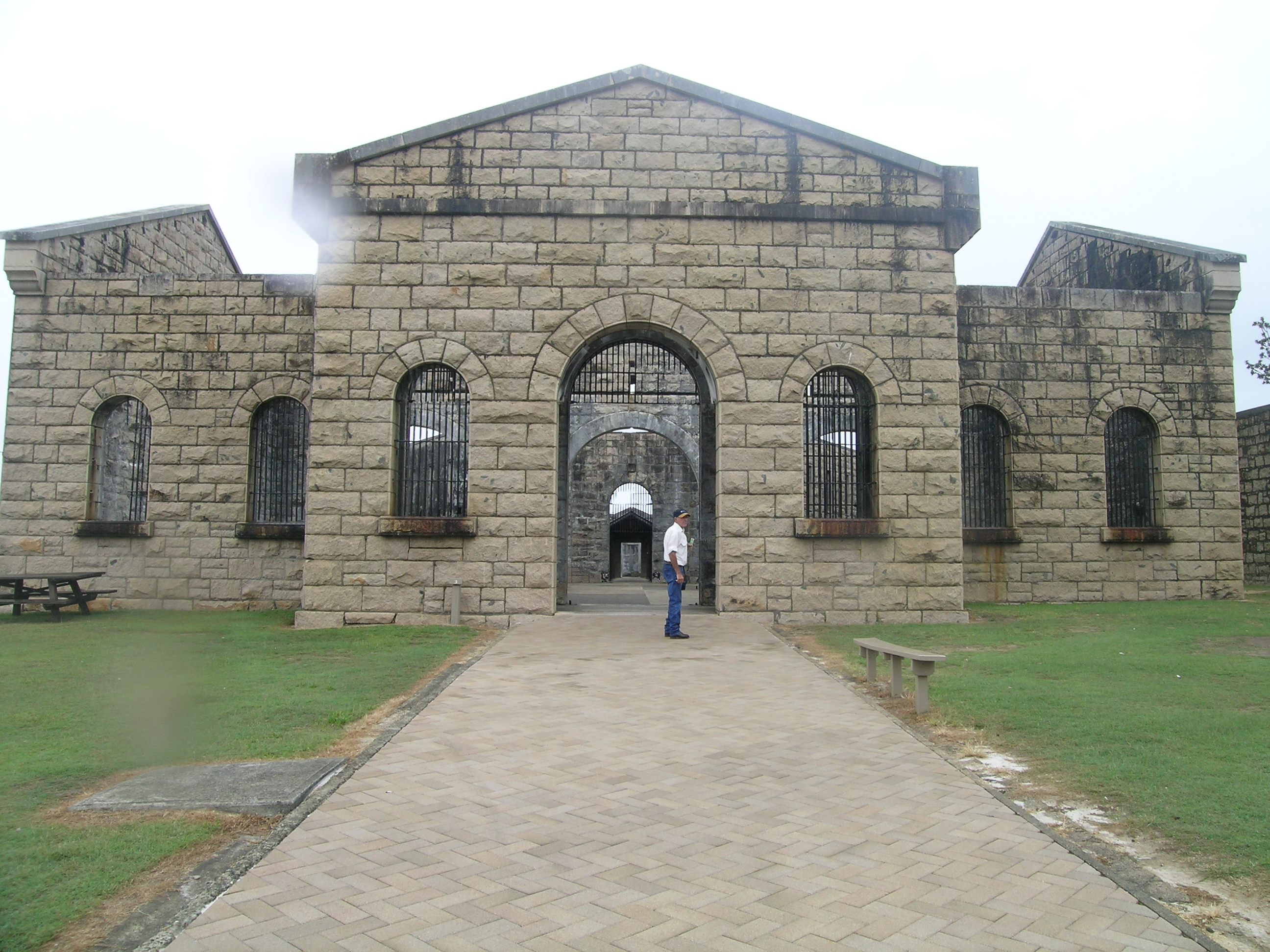
Trial Bay Gaol, NSW

Laggers Point is a headland on the Mid North Coast of New South Wales, Australia. It is the end of the north pointing peninsula which is the eastern side of Trial Bay.

The beach on the inside of the bay is sheltered and the National Parks and Wildlife Service operates a popular campground there. A surfing wave is known to break across the sand, but it's not highly regarded. Nat Young in his Surfing & sailboard guide to Australia rated it as a dubious kind of wave in mega southerly conditions.

== Trial Bay Gaol and breakwater ==
In 1861, a plan was formed to construct a breakwater off Laggers Point to make Trial Bay a harbour of refuge for those ships too big to cross river mouths. Further plans included the idea to use prison labour for the construction, with a prison established specifically for that purpose. In 1877, work on the gaol commenced and in 1886, it was proclaimed a prison and inmates moved there.

The breakwater they worked on was to extend some 1500 metres out into the bay, built from granite blocks quarried from the nearby hill. Heavy gales caused damage to the structure as it progressed over the years. In 1898 and 1899, new wings were built on the prison, suggesting work was intending to continue, but in 1903 it was abandoned. Apparently, the prison was costly to run and didn't fit with ideas of penology of the time.

About 300 metres of breakwater had been built, and it had shoaled up the bay considerably. A wharf had been built inside the breakwater in 1898, not meant for public use, but which ended up used regularly by passenger ships which could not navigate the Macleay River mouth. Today only a small section of the breakwater remains, about 50 metres, and nothing of the wharf.

In 1915, the gaol was reopened to hold German wartime internees. Most were single men of some education and included officers of the German Army Reserve. A rumour went around in 1917 that a German landing party planned to free the men and when a German raider SMS Wolf was seen in 1918 the men were moved to the large camp at Holsworthy outside Sydney.

This was the last use made of the prison and it was stripped and fixtures sold off in 1922. Today, it's open to the public, operated as a heritage site by the National Parks and Wildlife Service.

== German monument ==
Four internees died during their time in the gaol and in 1917 their compatriots built a monument up on the hill for them. Supposedly, during that building communication with the SS Wolf took place, though that would seem unlikely. The monument was destroyed by vandals in 1919, probably provoked by anti-German sentiment.

It remained as a pile of stones until in 1959 funding from the West German war graves commission saw it rebuilt by the Kempsey Rotary association.
