= Hans Lager =

Swedish modern pentathlete (born 1952)

Personal information
- Born: 24 June 1952 (age 74) Brännkyrka, Sweden

Sport
- Sport: Modern pentathlon

Hans Lager (born 24 June 1952) is a Swedish modern pentathlete. He competed at the 1976 Summer Olympics.
