= Nestor Östergren =

Swedish rower (1890–1970)

Personal information
- Full name: Nestor Edvard August Östergren
- Nationality: Swedish
- Born: 26 February 1890 Stockholm, Sweden
- Died: 28 October 1970 (aged 80) Stockholm, Sweden

Sport
- Sport: Rowing

Nestor Edvard August Östergren (26 February 1890 – 28 October 1970) was a Swedish rower. He competed in the men's coxed four event at the 1920 Summer Olympics.
