= Henry Larsen (Norwegian rower) =

Norwegian rower

Olympic medal record

Men's rowing
Bronze medal – third place	1920 Antwerp	Coxed four

Henry Ludvig Larsen (16 August 1891 – 20 January 1969) was a Norwegian rower who competed in the 1912 Summer Olympics and in the 1920 Summer Olympics.

In 1912, he was the bowman of the Norwegian boat, which was eliminated in the semi-finals of the coxed four event. In some sources, the crew members of this boat are also listed as bronze medalists. Eight years later, he won the bronze medal with the Norwegian boat.
