= Rowing at the 1920 Summer Olympics – Men's coxed four =

Men's coxed four at the Games of the VII Olympiad
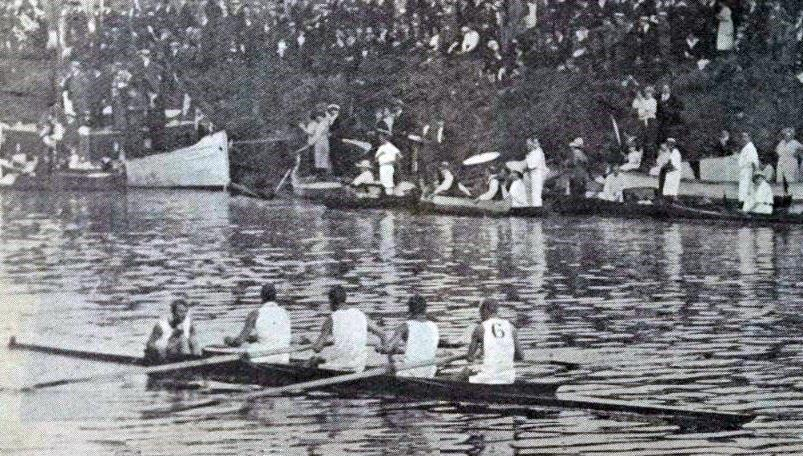
- Coxed four race
- Venue: Brussels–Scheldt Maritime Canal
- Dates: 28–29 August 1920
- Competitors: 40 from 8 nations
- Winning time: 6:54.0

Medalists
1st place, gold medalist(s)		Switzerland: Willy Brüderlin; Max Rudolf; Paul Rudolf; Paul Staub (cox); Hans Walter
2nd place, silver medalist(s)		United States: Sherm Clark (cox); Erich Federschmidt; Franz Federschmidt; Carl Klose; Ken Myers
3rd place, bronze medalist(s)		Norway: Per Gulbrandsen; Thoralf Hagen (cox); Theodor Klem; Henry Larsen; Birger Var

The men's coxed four event was part of the rowing programme at the 1920 Summer Olympics. The competition was held on 28 and 29 August 1920. It was the third appearance of the event, which had previously been held inaugural rowing competitions in 1900 as well as in 1912. Eight boats (40 competitors), each from a different nation, competed. The medals all went to nations that had not won a medal in the men's coxed four previously: Switzerland and the United States took gold and silver, respectively, in their debuts in the event; Norway took bronze.

== Background ==
This was the third appearance of the event. Rowing had been on the programme in 1896 but was cancelled due to bad weather. The coxed four was one of the four initial events introduced in 1900. It was not held in 1904 or 1908, but was held at every Games from 1912 to 1992 when it (along with the men's coxed pair) was replaced with the men's lightweight double sculls and men's lightweight coxless four.

The top nations in the coxed four coming into the Games included Switzerland (1920 European champions), France (1919 Inter-Allied champions), and Canada. France did not compete in the event at the Olympics, however, and Canada's team boat did not make it to Antwerp.

Brazil, Canada, Czechoslovakia, Switzerland, and the United States each made their debut in the event. Belgium, Norway, and Sweden competed for the second time, matching the absent France and Germany for a five-way tie for most among nations to that point.

== Competition format ==
The coxed four event featured five-person boats, with four rowers and a coxswain. It was a sweep rowing event, with the rowers each having one oar (and thus each rowing on one side). The competition used the 2000 metres distance that became standard at the 1912 Olympics and which has been used ever since except at the 1948 Games.

The tournament featured two rounds of competition, with no repechages. The semifinals had three heats, with 2 or 3 boats in each heat. The winner of each semifinal advanced to the final, with all other boats eliminated. There was a single final, with three boats, to determine the medals.

== Schedule ==
Date	Time	Round
Saturday, 28 August 1920	14:00	Semifinals
Sunday, 29 August 1920	14:30	Final

== Results ==
=== Semifinals ===
==== Semifinal 1 ====
The first heat featured the two top teams: Switzerland and Canada. The Canadian team had to use a borrowed boat when their own did not arrive in Antwerp. One of the riggers cracked immediately before the race started; the team managed to get into the lead anyway. However, the other shoulder of the rigger failed during the race and Canada had to row with only three oars for the remainder of the race.

Rank	Rowers	Coxswain	Nation	Time	Notes
1	Willy Brüderlin; Max Rudolf; Paul Rudolf; Hans Walter	Paul Staub	Switzerland	7:03.0	Q
2	John Lager; Nestor Östergren; Axel Eriksson; Gunnar Lager	Gösta Eriksson	Sweden	7:12.0	
3	Robert Hay; Harold Harcourt; Larry Landrian; Strathy Hay	Art Everett	Canada	7:18.0	

==== Semifinal 2 ====
Rank	Rowers	Coxswain	Nation	Time	Notes
1	Birger Var; Theodor Klem; Henry Larsen; Per Gulbrandsen	Thoralf Hagen	Norway	7:14.0	Q
2	Jean van Silfhout; Léon Vleurinck; Adrien D'Hondt; Robert Demulder	Raphael de Ligne	Belgium	7:40.0	

==== Semifinal 3 ====
Rank	Rowers	Coxswain	Nation	Time	Notes
1	Franz Federschmidt; Ken Myers; Erich Federschmidt; Carl Klose	Sherm Clark	United States	7:17.4	Q
2	Guilherme Lorena; João Jório; Alcides Veira; Abrahão Saliture	Ernesto Flores Filho	Brazil	7:25.4	
3	Jiří Wihan; Dominik Štillip; Jaroslav Oplt; Jindřich Mulač	Jan Bauch	Czechoslovakia	Unknown	

=== Final ===
Rank	Rowers	Coxswain	Nation	Time
1st place, gold medalist(s)	Willy Brüderlin; Max Rudolf; Paul Rudolf; Hans Walter	Paul Staub	Switzerland	6:54.0
2nd place, silver medalist(s)	Franz Federschmidt; Ken Myers; Erich Federschmidt; Carl Klose	Sherm Clark	United States	6:58.0
3rd place, bronze medalist(s)	Birger Var; Theodor Klem; Henry Larsen; Per Gulbrandsen	Thoralf Hagen	Norway	7:02.0

== Sources ==
- Belgium Olympic Committee (1957). Olympic Games Antwerp 1920: Official Report (in French).
- Wudarski, Pawel (1999). "Wyniki Igrzysk Olimpijskich" (in Polish).
