= Ejnar Tønsager =

Norwegian rower

Ejnar Tønsager (12 April 1888 – 15 October 1967) was a Norwegian rowing coxswain who competed in the 1908 Summer Olympics and in the 1912 Summer Olympics.

In 1908, he was the coxswain of the Norwegian boat, which was eliminated in the first round of the men's eight competition. Four years later, he was again the coxswain of the Norwegian boat, which was eliminated in the semi-finals of the coxed four event. In some sources the crew members of this boat are also listed as bronze medalists.
