= Olaf Dahll =

Norwegian rower

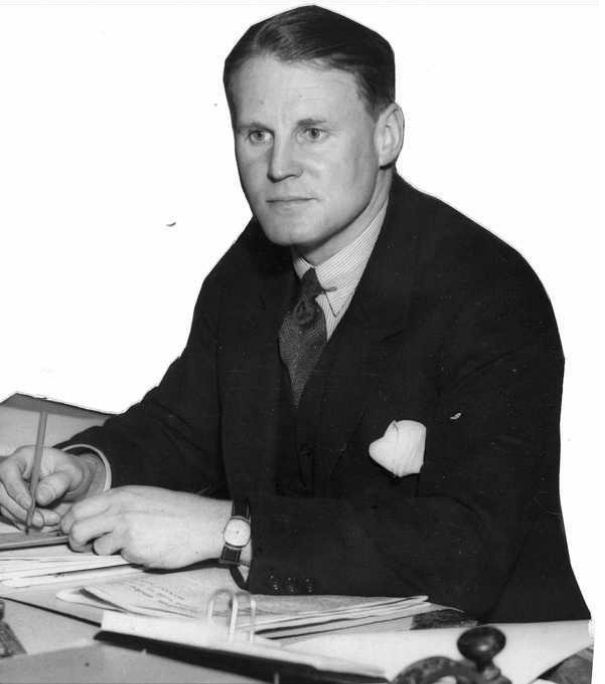
- Olaf Dahl around 1935, pictured at his desk. He worked as a lawyer and shipbroker.
- Born: 19 December 1889; Kristiania, Norway
- Died: 27 May 1968 (aged 78)
- Occupation: Lawyer

Olaf Dahll (19 December 1889 – 27 May 1968) was a Norwegian lawyer, competitive rower and sports administrator.

== Working career ==
Dahll was born in Kristiania, and graduated with the cand.jur. degree in 1913. After various assignments, including for the Ministry of Foreign Affairs, he started his own practice as a barrister in Kristiania in 1921, eventually with access to work with Supreme Court cases.

== Sporting career ==
Dahll participated in coxed four at the 1912 Summer Olympics in Stockholm. He chaired Norske Studenters Roklub 1915–1916 and was president of the Norwegian Fencing Federation from 1929 to 1934.
