= Gunnar Lager =

Swedish rower

Per Gunnar Lager (3 September 1888 – 30 October 1960) was a Swedish rower who competed in the 1912 Summer Olympics and in the 1920 Summer Olympics.

In 1912, he was the strokeman of the Swedish boat Vaxholm, which was eliminated in the first round of the coxed four competition. Eight years later, he was the strokeman of the Swedish boat, which was eliminated in the first round of the coxed four event. He rowed with his brother John.
