= Oscar Öhman =

Swedish politician (1886–1947)

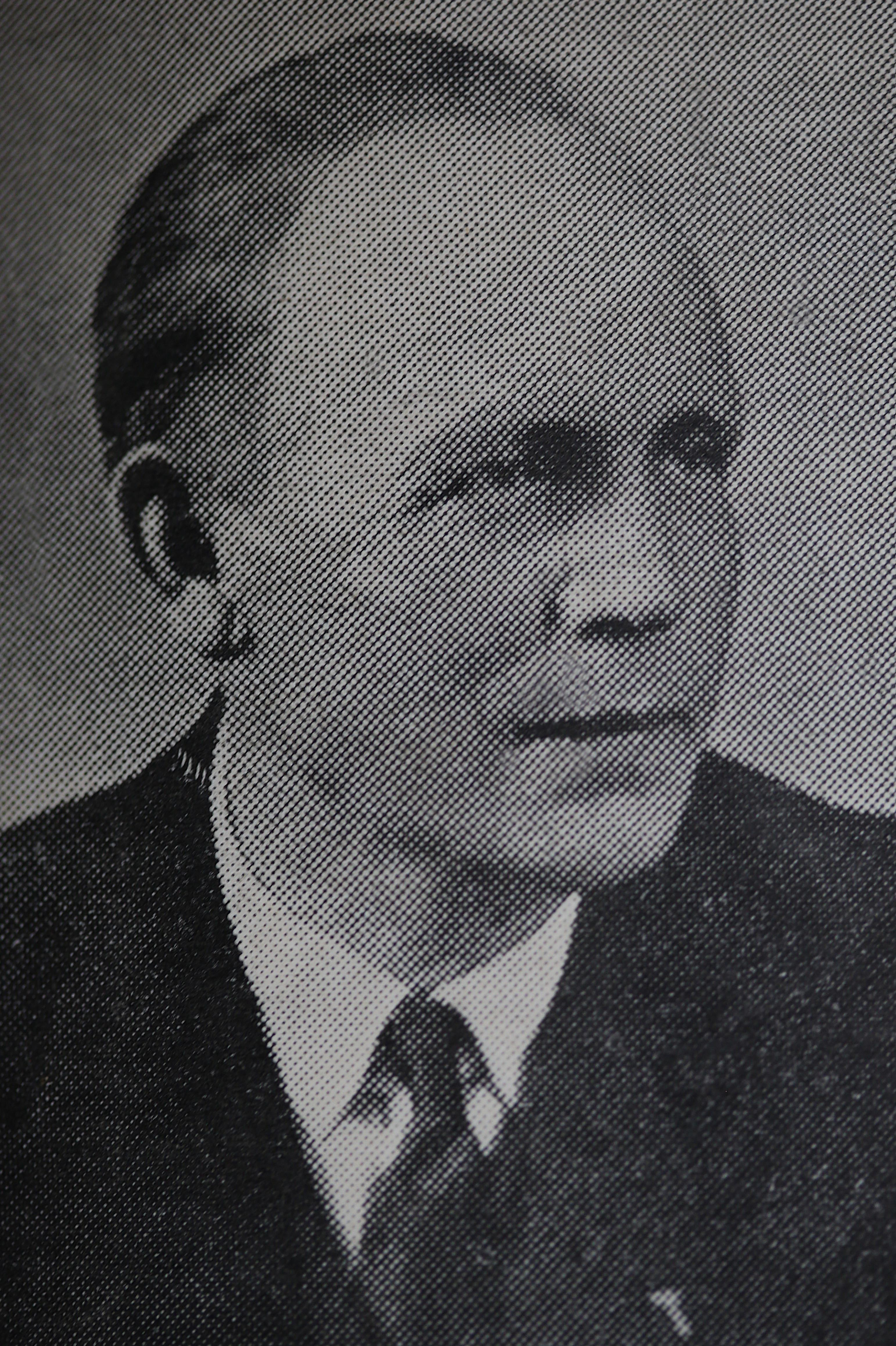
Portrait of Oscar Öhman

Eric Oscar Öhman (1 December 1886 – 16 January 1947) was a Swedish politician. He was a member of parliament (Second Chamber) 1929-1932 för Västernorrlands län.

He was the son of Erik Öhman (farmer and shoemaker) and Anna Svedlund. In 1916 he became a member of the municipal council of Timrå. Towards the end of 1919 Oscar Öhman founded the newspaper Medelpads-Kuriren (which later became Norrlands-Kuriren). In the same year he became vice chairman of the Timrå municipal council.

He was a key leader of the Communist Party in Sundsvall. In 1927 he became a member of the Västernorrlands län county council. When the Communist Party underwent a major split in 1929, Oscar Öhman sided with the Karl Kilbom faction.

Öhman lost his parliamentary seat in the 1932 election. Like many other personalities in the Kilbom faction, he later joined to the Social Democratic Party.
