= Håkon Tønsager =

Norwegian rower

Håkon Tønsager (31 July 1890 – 15 January 1975) was a Norwegian rower who competed in the 1912 Summer Olympics.

He was the stroke man of the Norwegian boat, which was eliminated in the semi-finals of the coxed fours event. In some sources, the crew members of this boat are also listed as bronze medalists.
