= Mathias Torstensen =

Norwegian rower

Personal information
- Birth name: Mathias Abraham Torstensen
- National team: Norway
- Born: 1890s
- Died: 9 July 1975 (aged 82)

Sport
- Country: Norway
- Sport: Rowing

Mathias Abraham Torstensen (1890s – 9 July 1975) was a Norwegian rower who competed in the 1912 Summer Olympics.

He was a crew member of the Norwegian boat, which was eliminated in the semi-finals of the coxed fours event. Listed as bronze medalists.
