= Fritjof Lager =

Swedish politician

Karl Fritjof Lager
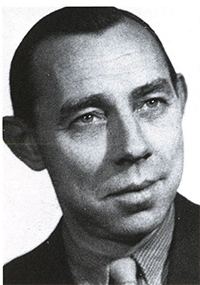
- Occupation: Politician

Karl Fritjof Lager (born October 1, 1905, Berga, Kronobergs län, died February 22, 1973) was a Swedish communist politician. Lager was born to a peasant family in Småland. He studied at Brunnsviks folkhögskola between 1926 and 1928. Lager was the party secretary of the Communist Party of Sweden 1933 to 1937, and 1948 to 1951. He held various editorial positions in the communist press. Lager represented the Communist Party in the city council of Stockholm 1946–1950.
