= Bengt Lager =

Swedish modern pentathlete

Personal information
- Born: 13 June 1951 (age 75) Brännkyrka, Sweden

Sport
- Sport: Modern pentathlon

Bengt Lager (born 13 June 1951) is a Swedish modern pentathlete. He competed at the 1976 Summer Olympics, finishing in 24th place in the individual event.
