= Canada at the 1920 Summer Olympics =

- IOC code: CAN
- NOC: Canadian Olympic Committee

in Antwerp
- Competitors: 52 in 9 sports
- Flag bearer: Archie McDiarmid
- Medals Ranked 12th: Gold 3 Silver 3 Bronze 3 Total 9

Summer Olympics appearances (overview)
- 1900; 1904; 1908; 1912; 1920; 1924; 1928; 1932; 1936; 1948; 1952; 1956; 1960; 1964; 1968; 1972; 1976; 1980; 1984; 1988; 1992; 1996; 2000; 2004; 2008; 2012; 2016; 2020; 2024

Other related appearances
- 1906 Intercalated Games

Canada competed at the 1920 Summer Olympics in Antwerp, Belgium. 52 competitors, all men, took part in 38 events in 9 sports. These games marked the introduction of winter sports to the Olympic program (competed in April 1920); Canada won its first gold medal for ice hockey.

== Medallists ==
=== Gold ===
- Winnipeg Falcons (Robert Benson, Walter Byron, Frank Fredrickson, Chris Fridfinnson, Magnus Goodman, Haldor Halderson, Konrad Johannesson, Allan Woodman) – Ice hockey, men's competition
- Earl Thomson – Athletics, men's 110 m hurdles
- Bert Schneider – Boxing, men's welterweight

=== Silver ===
- Clifford Graham – Boxing, men's bantamweight
- Georges Prud'Homme – Boxing, men's middleweight
- George Vernot – Swimming, men's 1500 m freestyle

=== Bronze ===
- Clarence Newton – Boxing, men's lightweight
- Moe Herscovitch – Boxing, men's middleweight
- George Vernot – Swimming, men's 400 m freestyle

== Aquatics ==
=== Diving ===
A single diver represented Canada in 1920. It was the nation's third appearance in the sport. Flint competed in all three of the men's events, but did not reach the final in any.

Men

Ranks given are within the semifinal group.

Diver	Event	Semifinals			Final		
Diver	Event	Points	Score	Rank	Points	Score	Rank
Richard Flint	3 m springboard	29	480.70	5	did not advance		
Richard Flint	10 m platform	28	351.35	6	did not advance		
Richard Flint	Plain high dive	34	126.0	7	did not advance		

=== Swimming ===
Three swimmers, all male, represented Canada in 1920. It was the nation's third appearance in the sport. Hodgson was unable to successfully defend his 1912 championships in the 400 and 1500 metre freestyle events, not even reaching the final in either; Vernot took a bronze and a silver in those events.

Ranks given are within the heat.

Men

Swimmer	Event	Quarterfinals		Semifinals		Final	
Swimmer	Event	Result	Rank	Result	Rank	Result	Rank
Sidney Gooday	200 m breast	unknown	5	did not advance			
Sidney Gooday	400 m breast	did not finish		did not advance			
George Hodgson	400 m free	5:49.8	2 Q	unknown	4	did not advance	
George Hodgson	1500 m free	24:36.6	2 Q	unknown	5	did not advance	
George Vernot	100 m free	1:05.2	1 Q	1:05.8	3	did not advance	
George Vernot	400 m free	5:32.6	1 Q	5:27.8	1 Q	5:29.6	3rd place, bronze medalist(s)
George Vernot	1500 m free	23:40.0	1 Q	22:59.4	1 Q	22:36.4	2nd place, silver medalist(s)

== Athletics ==
14 athletes represented Canada in 1920. It was the nation's fifth appearance in the sport, having competed in athletics every time the country competed at the Olympics. The best result for the team was Thomson's gold medal in the high hurdles, as Canada took a gold medal in athletics for the fifth straight Games.

Ranks given are within the heat.

Athlete	Event	Heats		Quarterfinals		Semifinals		Final	
Athlete	Event	Result	Rank	Result	Rank	Result	Rank	Result	Rank
Cyril Coaffee	100 m		3	did not advance					
Cyril Coaffee	200 m		3	did not advance					
James Dellow	Marathon	—						2:46:47.0	13
Edward Freeman	3 km walk	—					8	did not advance	
Edward Freeman	10 km walk	—				Disqualified		did not advance	
Edward Lawrence	1500 m	—				4:04.4	5	did not advance	
Edward Lawrence	10000 m	—				33:08.5	6	did not advance	
Georges Norman	Marathon	—						2:58:01.0	22
Alexander Ponton	100 m	11.2	2 Q	11.4	5	did not advance			
Alexander Ponton	200 m	22.8	2 Q	22.7	2 Q	22.9	4	did not advance	
Hector Phillips	400 m	52.3	2 Q	51.4	5	did not advance			
Hector Phillips	800 m	—			5	did not advance			
Arthur Scholes	Marathon	—						2:48:30.0	15
Albert Smoke	Marathon	—						did not finish	
Earl Thomson	110 m hurdles	—		15.4	2 Q	15.0 WR	1 Q	14.8 WR	1st place, gold medalist(s)
Thomas Towns	1500 m	—					5	did not advance	
Thomas Towns	5000 m	—				did not finish		did not advance	
Thomas Towns	Cross country	—						unknown	9

Athlete	Event	Qualifying		Final	
Athlete	Event	Result	Rank	Result	Rank
John Cameron	Hammer throw	No mark	12	did not advance	
William Kennedy	High jump	No mark	21	did not advance	
Archie McDiarmid	Hammer throw	44.66	9	did not advance	
Archie McDiarmid	56 lb weight throw	9.475	4	10.12	4

== Boxing ==
The Canadian Olympic Committee named W. A. Hewitt to its sub-committee for boxing to select who represented Canada at the Olympics, and had been credited with officiating hundreds of bouts as a boxing referee in Toronto. He oversaw travel arrangements for the national team to the remainder of the 1920 Summer Olympics which began in August. The boxers which he helped select won one gold, two silver, and two bronze medals for Canada.

Boxer	Weight class	Round of 32	Round of 16	Quarterfinals	Semifinals	Final / bronze match	
Boxer	Weight class	Opposition Score	Opposition Score	Opposition Score	Opposition Score	Opposition Score	Rank
Chris Graham	Bantamweight	N/A	bye	Ricard (FRA); W	Hébrans (BEL); W	Walker (RSA); L	2nd place, silver medalist(s)
Moe Herscovitch	Middleweight	bye	Munting (NED); W	Bradley (RSA); W	Mallin (GBR); L	Strømme (NOR); W	3rd place, bronze medalist(s)
Clarence Newton	Lightweight	N/A	Jensen (DEN); W	Sæterhaug (NOR); W	Johansen (DEN); L	Beland (RSA); W	3rd place, bronze medalist(s)
Walter Newton	Featherweight	bye	Clausen (DEN); L	did not advance			9
Georges Prud'Homme	Middleweight	bye	Masson (BEL); W	Rey-Golliet (FRA); W	Strømme (NOR); W	Mallin (GBR); L	2nd place, silver medalist(s)
William Rankin	Featherweight	Hesterman (NED); L	did not advance				16
Bert Schneider	Welterweight	bye	Thomas (RSA); W	Steen (NOR); W	Colberg (USA); W	Ireland (GBR); W	1st place, gold medalist(s)
Harry Turner	Flyweight	N/A	Rampignon (FRA); L	did not advance			9

Opponent nation	Wins	Losses	Percent
Belgium	2	0	1.000
Denmark	1	2	.333
France	2	1	.667
Great Britain	1	2	.333
Netherlands	1	1	.500
Norway	4	0	1.000
South Africa	3	1	.750
United States	1	0	1.000
Total	15	7	.682

Round	Wins	Losses	Percent
Round of 32	0	1	.000
Round of 16	4	2	.667
Quarterfinals	5	0	1.000
Semifinals	3	2	.600
Final	1	2	.333
Bronze match	2	0	1.000
Total	15	7	.682

== Cycling ==
Five cyclists represented Canada in 1920. It was the nation's third appearance in the sport. Macdonald's fifth-place finish in the 50 kilometres was the best result of the Games for the Canadian cyclists.

=== Road cycling ===
Cyclist	Event	Final	
Cyclist	Event	Result	Rank
Harold Bounsell	Time trial	did not finish	
Harry Martin	Time trial	5:30:16.2	38
Herbert Macdonald	Time trial	5:20:34.6	31
Norman Webster	Time trial	did not finish	
Harold Bounsell; Harry Martin; Herbert Macdonald; Norman Webster	Team time trial	did not finish	

=== Track cycling ===
Ranks given are within the heat.

Cyclist	Event	Heats		Quarterfinals		Repechage semis		Repechage final		Semifinals		Final	
Cyclist	Event	Result	Rank	Result	Rank	Result	Rank	Result	Rank	Result	Rank	Result	Rank
Harold Bounsell	Sprint	unknown	2 Q	unknown	2 R	13.4	1 Q	unknown	2	did not advance			
Harold Bounsell	50 km	N/A										did not finish	
Herbert Macdonald	Sprint	unknown	4	did not advance									
Herbert Macdonald	50 km	N/A										unknown	5
William Taylor	Sprint	unknown	3	did not advance									
William Taylor	50 km	N/A										did not finish	
Norman Webster	Sprint	unknown	2 Q	unknown	3 R	unknown	3	did not advance					
Norman Webster	50 km	N/A										did not finish	
Harold Bounsell; Herbert Macdonald; William Taylor; Norman Webster	Team pursuit	N/A		unknown	2	N/A				did not advance			

== Ice hockey ==
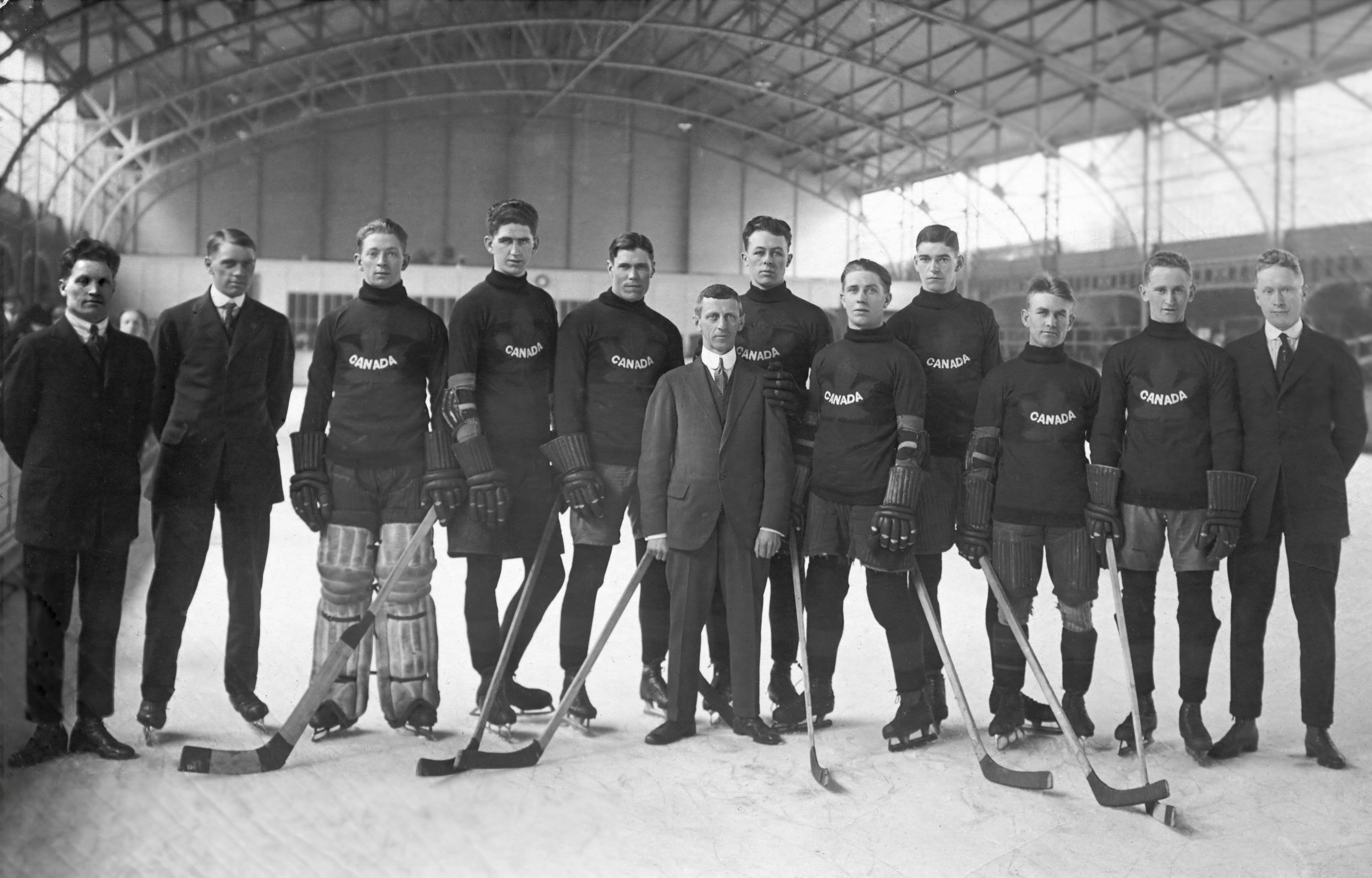
Hewitt and the Winnipeg Falcons at the 1920 Summer Olympics

The Canadian Amateur Hockey Association (CAHA) chose the Winnipeg Falcons as the 1920 Allan Cup champions to represent the Canada men's national team in ice hockey at the 1920 Summer Olympics, instead of forming a national all-star team on short notice. W. A. Hewitt represented the Canadian Olympic Committee and oversaw finances for the Falcons, and reported on the Olympic Games for Canadian newspapers. He and his wife were a father and mother figure to the Falcons, and sailed with them aboard SS Melita from Saint John to Liverpool, then onto Antwerp.

Hewitt introduced the CAHA rules of play to the Ligue Internationale de Hockey sur Glace (LIHG) at the Olympics. Writer Andrew Podnieks described Hewitt's interpretation of the rules as "competitive yet gentlemanly", and that the rules of play were accepted for Olympic hockey. Hewitt refereed the first Olympic hockey game played, an 8–0 win by the Sweden men's national team versus the Belgium men's national team, on April 23, 1920. The Falcons and the Hewitts returned home aboard SS Grampian from Le Havre to Quebec City. The Falcons honoured Hewitt and his wife at a private dinner and presented them with a silver cup inscribed with the number 13, for the number of people who made the trip to the Olympics and the team's lucky number.

Roster

Coach: (Iceland) Guðmundur Sigurjónsson

Pos	Player	GP	G	Birthdate	Age
D	Bobby Benson	3	1	May 18, 1894	25
G	Wally Byron	3	0	September 2, 1884	35
F	Frank Fredrickson	3	12	July 11, 189	24
R	Chris Fridfinnson	1	1	June 14, 1898	21
F	Mike Goodman	3	3	March 18, 1898	22
F	Haldor Halderson	3	9	January 6, 1900	20
D	Konnie Johannesson	3	2	August 10, 1896	23
R	Huck Woodman	2	1	March 11, 1899	21

Gold medal quarterfinals

24 April 1920; 21:30	Canada	15 – 0 (7–0, 8–0)	Czechoslovakia	Palais de Glace d'Anvers

Game reference
Walter Byron	Goalies	Jan Peka
Halderson (7); Fredrickson (4); Goodman (2); Woodman; Johannesson / Goals
0 min	Penalties	0 min

Gold medal semifinals

25 April 1920; 21:00	Canada	2 – 0 (0–0, 2–0)	United States	Palais de Glace d'Anvers

Game reference
Walter Byron	Goalies	Ray Bonney	Referee: (France) Alfred de Rauch
Fredrickson / 1 – 0; Johannesson / 2 – 0			Referee: (France) Alfred de Rauch
7 min	Penalties	5 min	Referee: (France) Alfred de Rauch

Gold medal game

26 April 1920; 22:00	(gold) Canada	12 – 1 (5–1, 7–0)	Sweden	Palais de Glace d'Anvers

Game reference

Walter Byron
Goalies
Seth Howander
Referee:
(United States) Joseph McCormick

Halderson – 1:15	1 – 0
Fridfinnson − 1:55	2 – 0
Fredrickson – 5:20	3 – 0
	3 – 1	15:58 – Svensson
Fredrickson – 16:00	4 – 1
Fredrickson – 17:35	5 – 1
Goodman – 23:47	6 – 1
Benson – 28:09	7 – 1
Fredrickson – 29:15	8 – 1
Fredrickson – 29:30	9 – 1
Fredrickson – 34:55	10 – 1
Halderson – 36:20	11 – 1
Fredrickson – 39:02	12 – 1

0 min
Penalties
0 min

Final rank
(gold) Gold

== Rowing ==
Five rowers represented Canada in 1920. It was the nation's fourth straight appearance in the sport. Canada sent one boat, in the coxed fours. It was unable to advance past the semifinals, taking third place in the three-boat heat.

Ranks given are within the heat.

Rower	Cox	Event	Quarterfinals		Semifinals		Final	
Rower	Cox	Event	Result	Rank	Result	Rank	Result	Rank
Harold Harcourt; Robert Hay; Strathy Hay; Larry Landreau	Art Everett	Coxed four	N/A		7:18.0	3	did not advance	

== Shooting ==
Seven shooters represented Canada in 1920. It was the nation's third appearance in the sport. For the second straight Games, the Canadian shooters were unable to earn any medals.

Shooter	Event	Final	
Shooter	Event	Result	Rank
George Beattie	Trap	73	5
John Black	Trap	52	unknown
William Hamilton	Trap	82	11
Robert Montgomery	Trap	86	6
Samuel Vance	Trap	71	unknown
George Beattie; William Hamilton; William McLaren; Robert Montgomery; True Oliver; Samuel Vance	Team clay pigeons	474	5

== Wrestling ==
A single wrestler competed for Canada in 1920. It was the nation's second appearance in the sport.

=== Freestyle ===
Wrestler	Event	Round of 32	Round of 16	Quarterfinals	Semifinals	Finals / Bronze match	Rank
Frank Locon	Freestyle middle	Johnson (USA) (L)	did not advance				17

Opponent nation	Wins	Losses	Percent
United States	0	1	.000
Total	0	1	.000

Round	Wins	Losses	Percent
Round of 32	0	1	.000
Round of 16	0	0	–
Quarterfinals	0	0	–
Semifinals	0	0	–
Final	0	0	–
Bronze match	0	0	–
Total	0	1	.000

== Sources ==
- Podnieks, Andrew (1997). Canada's Olympic Hockey Teams: The Complete History 1920–1998. Toronto, Ontario: Doubleday Canada. ISBN 0-385-25688-4.
- Podnieks, Andrew; Hockey Hall of Fame (2005). Silverware. Toronto, Ontario: Fenn Publishing. ISBN 1-55168-296-6.
- Belgium Olympic Committee (1957). Olympic Games Antwerp 1920: Official Report (in French).
