= 1900 in Norway =

- Centuries: 17th; 18th; 19th; 20th; 21st
- Decades: 1880s; 1890s; 1900s; 1910s; 1920s
- See also: 1900 in Sweden; List of years in Norway

Events in the year 1900 in Norway.

== Incumbents ==
- Monarch: Oscar II.
- Prime Minister: Johannes Steen

== Events ==
- 17 February – The Norwegian Ministry of Agriculture and Food is established
- 21 November – the Norwegian Employers' Association was founded.
- 3 December – Population Census: There were 2,239,881 inhabitants in Norway.
- The 1900 Parliamentary election takes place.
- The construction of Gamlehaugen Castle was finished.

== Notable births ==
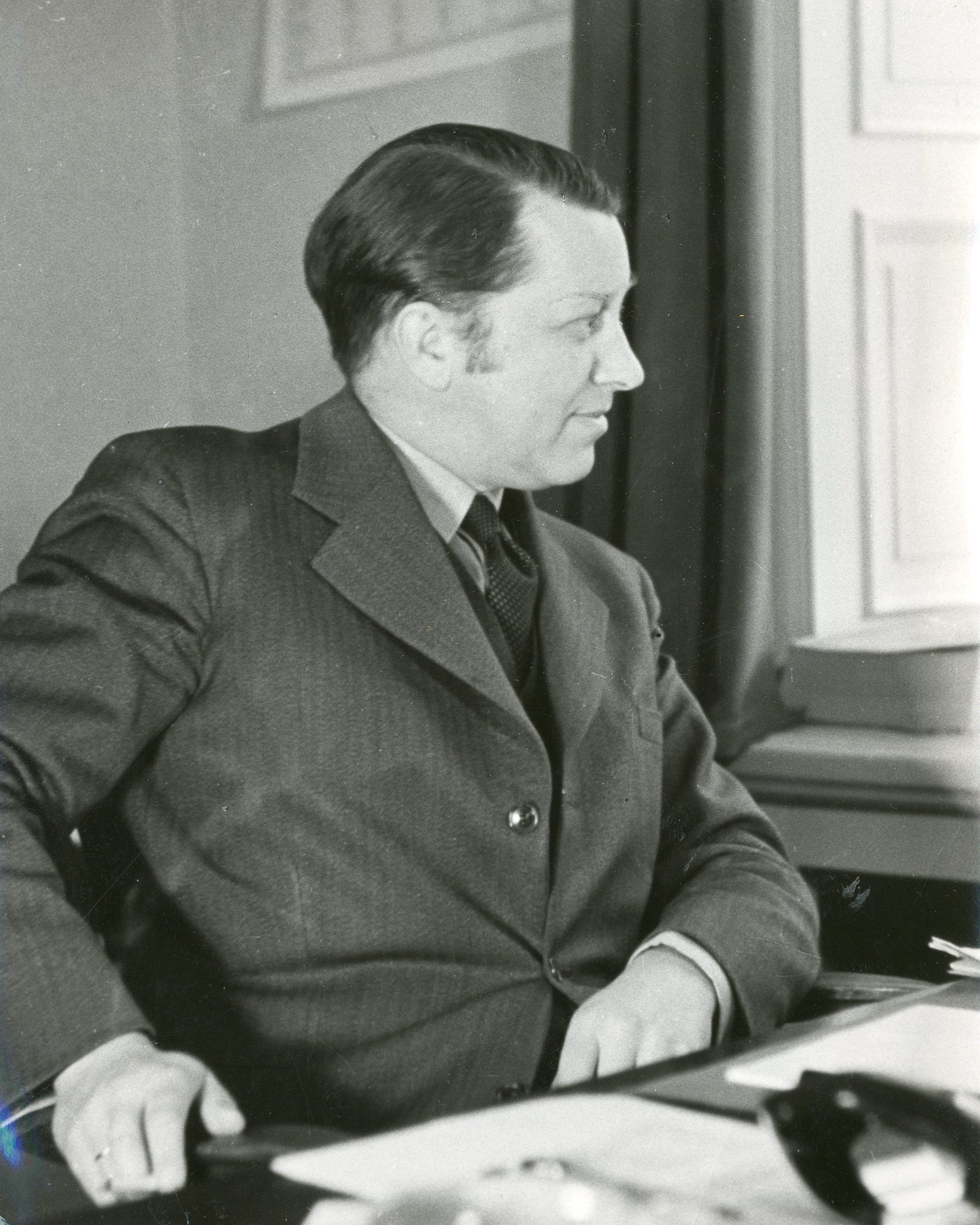
Jens Schive

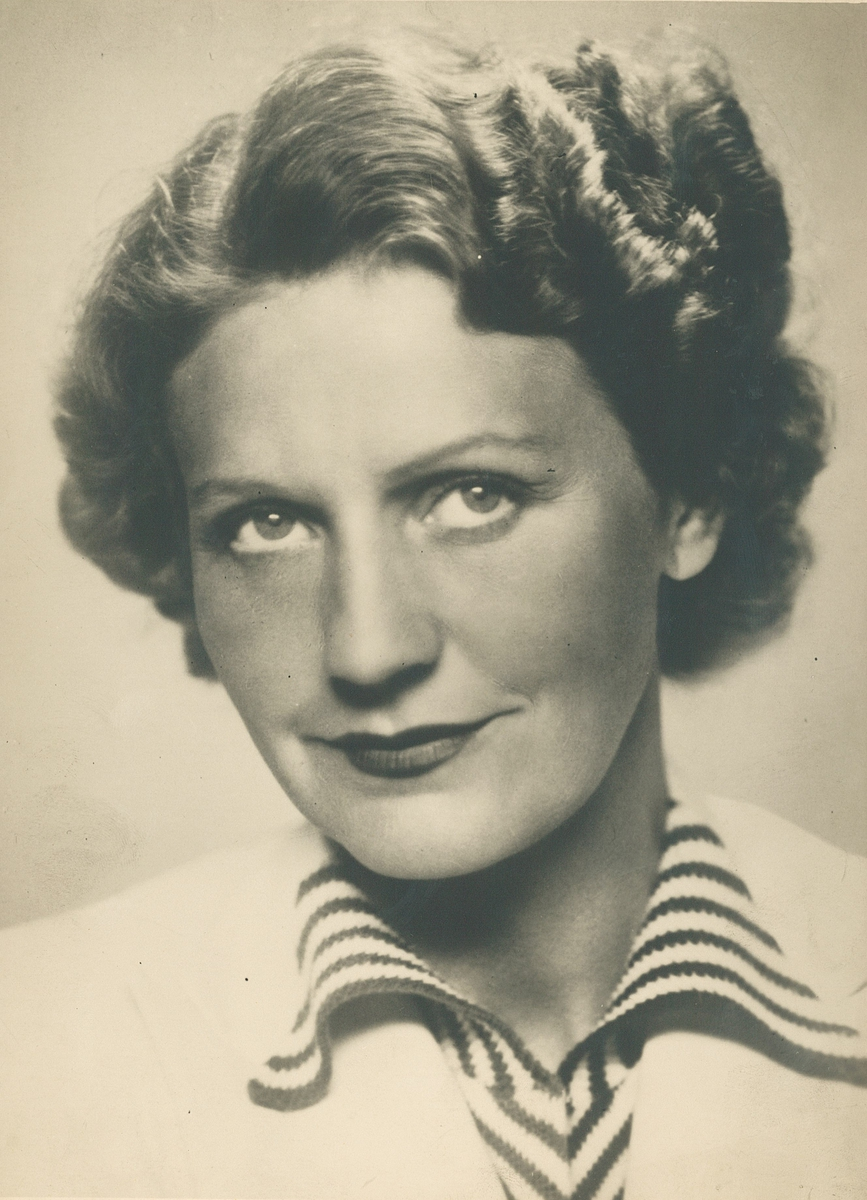
Lillemor von Hanno

- 5 January – Nina Eik-Nes, politician (died 1997)
- 31 January – Bertel Flaten, politician (died 1963)
- 5 February – Gunnar Larsen, journalist, writer and translator (died 1958).
- 14 February – Ola Johan Gjengedal, politician (died 1992)
- 4 March – Axel Coldevin, historian (died 1992).
- 15 March – Christian Schweigaard Stang, linguistics researcher and professor (died 1977)
- 16 March – Ragnhild Larsen, diver (died 1969)
- 26 March – Ivar Jacobsen Norevik, politician (died 1956)
- 28 March – Olav Marensius Strandås, politician (died 1981)
- 17 April – Ejnar Torgensen, sailor and Olympic silver medallist (died 1932)
- 10 May – Gunvald Engelstad, politician (died 1972)
- 13 May – Frithjof Bettum, jurist and politician (died 1984)
- 1 June – Bjarne Råsberg, photographer (died 1942)
- 12 June – Hjalmar Nygaard, boxer (died 1937)
- 13 June – Johan Støa, multi-sportsman (died 1991)
- 30 June – Knut Rød, police officer responsible for the transfer of Jewish people to SS troops in Oslo, acquitted (died 1986)
- 5 July – Ole Hegge, cross country skier and Olympic silver medallist (died 1994)
- 17 July – Eilert Bøhm, gymnast and Olympic silver medallist (died 1982)
- 18 July – Karsten Fonstad, politician.
- 21 July – Ole Rømer Aagaard Sandberg, politician (died 1985)
- 5 August – Sverre Sørsdal, boxer and Olympic silver medallist (died 1996)
- 14 August – Arne Korsmo, architect (died 1968 in Norway)
- 29 August – Thorleif Christoffersen, Olympic gold medallist (died 1975)
- 13 September – Viggo Hansteen, lawyer and politician, executed (died 1941)
- 17 September – Martha Ostenso, Canadian novelist and screenwriter (died 1963)
- 22 September – Ruth Krefting, painter and playwright (died 1987).
- 23 September – Jørgen Vogt, newspaper editor and politician (died 1972)
- 26 September – Hjalmar Strømme, boxer (died 1925)
- 30 September – Erling Johan Vindenes, politician (died 1984)
- 8 October – Torstein Selvik, politician (died 1983)
- 14 October – Arne Mortensen, rower and Olympic bronze medallist (died 1942)
- 18 October – Jens Schive, journalist and diplomat (died 1962)
- 31 October – Asbjørg Borgfelt, sculptor (died 1976).
- 15 December – Arthur Olsen, boxer (died 1951)
- 24 December – Dagfinn Zwilgmeyer, psalmist (died 1979).
- 30 December – Lillemor von Hanno, actress and writer (died 1984).

=== Full date unknown ===
- Eivind Stenersen Engelstad, archaeologist and art historian (died 1969)
- Gunnar Emil Garfors, poet (died 1979)
- Einar Skjæraasen, author (died 1966)

== Notable deaths ==
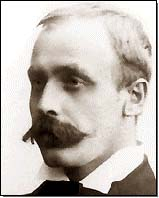
Sigbjørn Obstfelder

- 13 January – Peter Waage, chemist and professor (born 1833)
- 28 May – Morten Diderik Emil Lambrechts, jurist and politician (born 1824)
- 29 July – Sigbjørn Obstfelder, writer (born 1866)

=== Full date unknown ===
- Christen Christensen, military officer and politician (born 1826)
- Thomas Henrik Hammer, jurist and politician (born 1815)
- Henrik Laurentius Helliesen, politician and Minister (born 1824)
- Jacob Lerche Johansen, politician and Minister (born 1818)
- Niels Mathiesen, politician and merchant (born 1829)
- Bernt Julius Muus, Lutheran minister (born 1832)
- Augusta Schrumpf, actress and opera singer (born 1813)
