= 1899 in Norway =

- Centuries: 17th; 18th; 19th; 20th; 21st
- Decades: 1870s; 1880s; 1890s; 1900s; 1910s
- See also: 1899 in Sweden; List of years in Norway

The following events occurred in Norway in the year 1899.

== Incumbents ==
- Monarch – Oscar II.
- Prime Minister – Johannes Steen

== Events ==
- 1 April – The Norwegian Confederation of Trade Unions is established.
- 27 June – The paperclip is patented by Johan Vaaler, a Norwegian inventor.
- 1 September – The Nationaltheatret is inaugurated.
- 13 October – The Røvær accident: A storm kills 30 people at sea near Haugesund.
- 14 October – The Titran accident: A storm kills 141 fishermen at sea near Frøya.
- Grans Brewery is founded.

== Popular culture ==
=== Sports ===
- 5 March – The sports club Korsvoll IL is founded.
- 10 August – Viking FK football club is founded.
- The sports club Kongsberg IF is founded.
- The gymnastics club Volda TI is founded.

=== Theatre ===
- 25 August – First performance at the theatre academy Sekondteatret
- 1 September – First performance at the newly constructed National Theatre in Kristiania

=== Literature ===
- The newspaper Rogalands Avis established
- The newspaper Finnmarken established

== Notable births ==
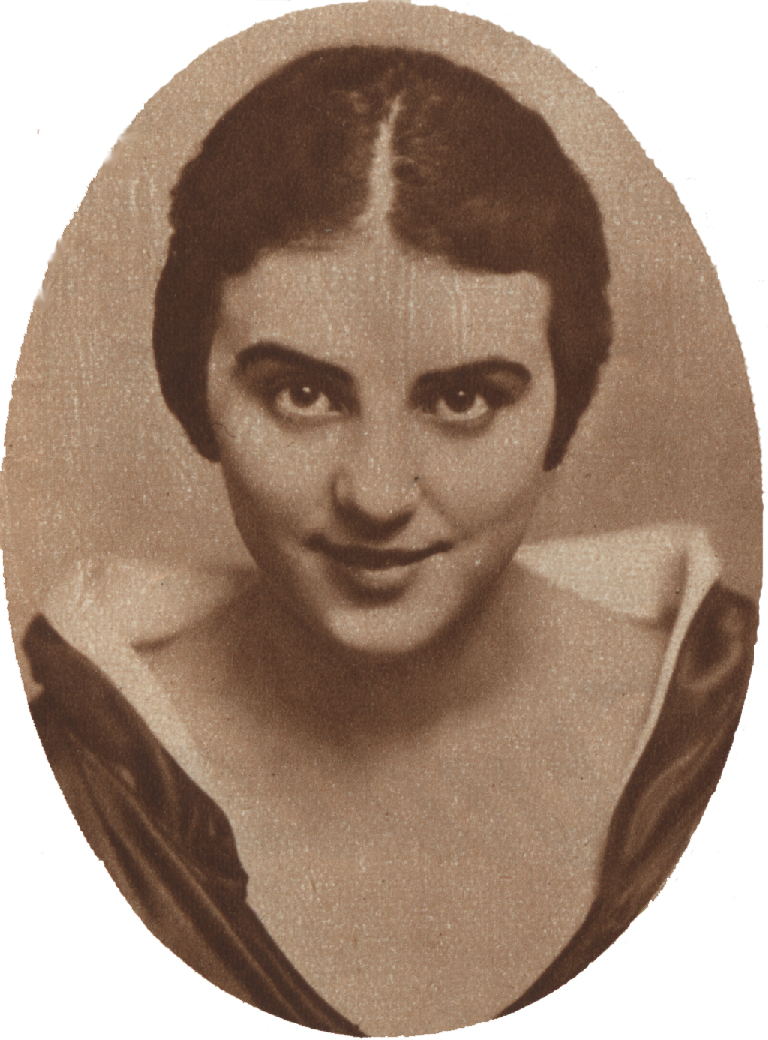
Lillebil Ibsen

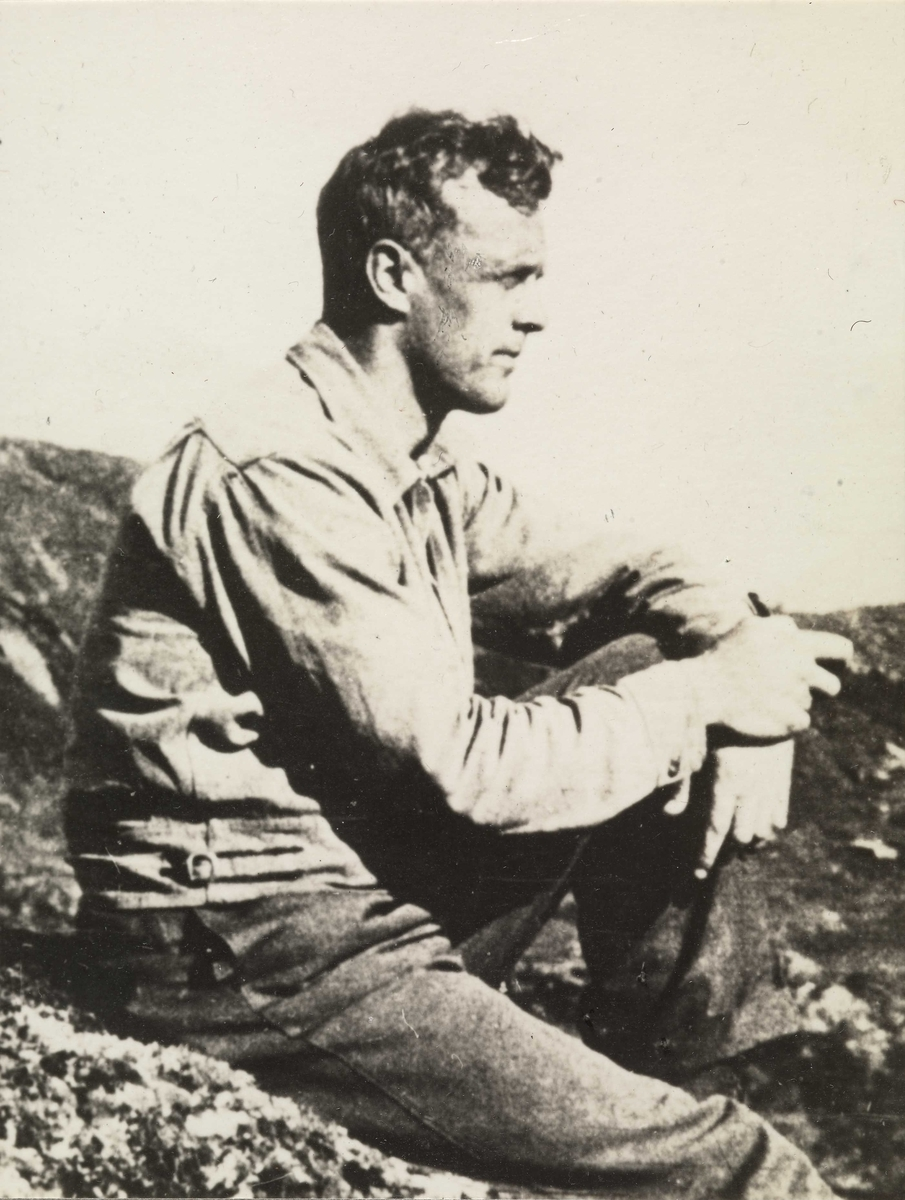
Helge Ingstad

- 25 January – Peder Holt, politician (died 1963)
- 25 January – Rolf Jacobsen, boxer (died 1960)
- 3 February – Olaf Aarvold, priest and politician (died 1991)
- 12 February – Johan Grøttumsbråten, skier and multiple Olympic gold medallist (died 1983)
- 13 February – Rolf Stenersen, businessman (died 1978).
- 15 February – Mikal Grøvan, politician (died 1956)
- 14 March – Kjell Tellander, politician (died 1968)
- 17 March – Søren Berg Sørensen Moen, politician (died 1946)
- 26 March – Ragnvald Mikal Andersen, politician (died 1995)
- 8 April – Arthur Sundt, politician (died 1971)
- 26 April – Fanny Elsta, opera singer (died 1978)
- 27 April – Erling Johannes Norvik, politician (died 1964)
- 9 June – Signe Amundsen, operatic soprano (died 1987)
- 1 July – Haakon Olsen Wika, politician (died 1981)
- 17 July – Johannes Overå, fisheries administrator (died 1989).
- 23 July – Johan Trandem, shot putter and discus thrower (died 1996)
- 25 July – Olav Svendsen, jurist.
- 6 August – Lillebil Ibsen, dancer and actress (died 1989)
- 6 August – Torstein Børte, politician (died 1985)
- 6 August – Finn Nagell, military officer, Milorg pioneer, economist and businessperson (died 1977).
- 8 August – Olav Sundal, gymnast and Olympic silver medallist (died 1978)
- 17 August – Torolv Kandahl, politician (died 1982)
- 23 August – Terje Wold, judge, politician and Minister (died 1972)
- 25 August – Karl Aas, gymnast and Olympic silver medallist (died 1943)
- 27 August – Per Hagen, politician (died 1983)
- 13 September – Magnus Bjorndal, Norwegian American engineer (died 1971)
- 22 September – Emil Løvlien, forest worker, trade unionist and politician (died 1973).
- 30 September – Henry Larsen, Arctic explorer in Canada (died 1964)
- 7 October – Øystein Ore, mathematician (died 1968)
- 23 October – Bernt Balchen, polar and aviation pioneer in America (died 1973)
- 24 October – Einar Hareide, politician (died 1983)
- 1 November – Anne Grimdalen, sculptor (died 1961)
- 7 November – Bjarne Fjærtoft, politician (died 1981)
- 12 November – Sverre Hansen, long jumper and Olympic bronze medallist (died 1991)
- 24 November – Petter Jamvold, sailor and Olympic gold medallist (died 1961)
- 27 November – Knut Hergel, actor and theatre director (died 1982)
- 18 December – Peter Wessel Zapffe, author and philosopher (died 1990)
- 20 December – Finn Ronne, explorer (died 1980)
- 30 December – Helge Ingstad, explorer (died 2001)

=== Full date unknown ===
- Nils Hønsvald, politician and Minister (died 1971)
- Jonas Lie, politician and Minister, collaborator (died 1945)
- Egil Offenberg, politician and Minister (died 1975)
- Jakob Martin Pettersen, politician and Minister (died 1970)
- Knut Robberstad, jurist and philologist (died 1981)
- Arne Torkildsen, neurosurgeon (died 1968)

== Notable deaths ==
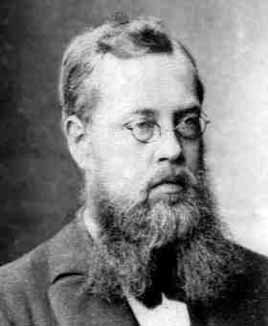
Sophus Lie

- 2 February – Halfdan Egedius, painter and illustrator (born 1877)
- 18 February – Sophus Lie, mathematician (born 1842)
- 26 May – Wilhelmine Gulowsen, writer (born 1848)
- 5 June – Magnus Feilberg, bookseller and publisher (born 1817)
- 11 June – Jakob Sverdrup, bishop and politician (born 1845)
- 4 September – Jacob Dybwad, bookseller and publisher (born 1823).
- 8 December – Johan Christian Tandberg Castberg, newspaper founder and editor and politician (born 1827)

=== Full date unknown ===
- Olav Jakobsen Høyem, teacher, telegrapher, supervisor of banknote printing and linguist (born 1830)
- Lauritz Jenssen, businessperson and politician (born 1837)
- Oluf Rygh, archeologist, philologist and historian (born 1833)
- Christian Homann Schweigaard, politician and Prime Minister (born 1838)
