= Hesterman =

Hesterman is a surname. Notable people with the surname include:

- Wim Hesterman (1897–1971), a Dutch boxer
- Jan Hesterman (1893–1963), a Dutch boxer
- Charles Hesterman Merz (1874–1940), a British engineer
- Oran B. Hesterman, an American non-profit company executive

== See also ==
- Westerman
