= Boxing at the 1920 Summer Olympics – Featherweight =

Boxing competitions

Men's featherweight boxing at the Games of the VII Olympiad
- Venue: Antwerp Zoo auditorium
- Dates: August 21–24, 1920
- Competitors: 17 from 10 nations

Medalists
1st place, gold medalist(s)		Paul Fritsch	France
2nd place, silver medalist(s)		Jean Gachet	France
3rd place, bronze medalist(s)		Edoardo Garzena	Italy

The men's featherweight event was part of the boxing programme at the 1920 Summer Olympics. The weight class was the third-lightest contested, and allowed boxers of up to 126 pounds (57.2 kilograms). The competition was held from August 21, 1920 to August 24, 1920. 17 boxers from ten nations competed.

== Results ==
Round of 32
Nick Clausen (DEN)	—
Bye	—
Walter Newton (CAN)	—
Bye	—
Jack Zivic (USA)	—
Bye	—
Jean Gachet (FRA)	—
Bye	—
Arthur Olsen (NOR)	W
Ángel Rodríguez (ARG)	L
Philippe Bovy (BEL)	—
Bye	—
Wim Hesterman (NED)	W
William Rankin (CAN)	L
Paul Fritsch (FRA)	—
Bye	—
George Etcell (USA)	—
Bye	—
Paul Erdal (NOR)	—
Bye	—
Frederick Adams (GBR)	—
Bye	—
Edoardo Garzena (ITA)	—
Bye	—
Joseph Vincken (BEL)	—
Bye	—
James Cater (GBR)	—
Bye	—
Hans Nielsen (DEN)	—
Bye	—

Round of 16
Clausen (DEN)	W
Newton (CAN)	L
Zivic (USA)	—
Bye	—
Gachet (FRA)	W
Olsen (NOR)	L
Bovy (BEL)	W
Hesterman (NED)	L
Fritsch (FRA)	W
Etzell (USA)	L
Erdal (NOR)	W
Adams (GBR)	L
Garzena (ITA)	W
Vincken (BEL)	L
Cater (GBR)	W
Nielsen (DEN)	L

Quarterfinals
Clausen (DEN)	L
Zivic (USA)	W
Gachet (FRA)	W
Bovy (BEL)	L
Fritsch (FRA)	W
Erdal (NOR)	L
Garzena (ITA)	W
Cater (GBR)	L

Semifinals
Zivic (USA)	L
Gachet (FRA)	W
Fritsch (FRA)	W
Garzena (ITA)	L

Final
Gachet (FRA)	L
Fritsch (FRA)	W
Bronze medal bout
Garzena (ITA)	W
Zivic (USA)	L
