= Paul Erdal =

Norwegian boxer (1902–1985)

Paul Erdal (16 May 1902 – 8 February 1985) was a Norwegian boxer who competed in the 1920 Summer Olympics. In 1920 he was eliminated in the quarter-finals of the featherweight class. After a bye in the first round he won his fight against Frederick Adams in the second round but he lost his next bout to the future gold medalist Paul Fritsch.
