= Anders Pedersen =

Anders Pedersen may refer to:

- Anders Pedersen (sailor), Norwegian competitive sailor
- Anders Gravers Pedersen, Danish anti-Islam activist
- Anders Petersen (boxer) (1899–1966), Danish flyweight boxer

== See also ==
- Anders Petersen (disambiguation)
