= Boxing at the 1920 Summer Olympics – Middleweight =

Boxing competitions

Men's middleweight boxing at the Games of the VII Olympiad
- Venue: Antwerp Zoo auditorium
- Dates: August 21–24, 1920
- Competitors: 17 from 9 nations

Medalists
1st place, gold medalist(s)		Harry Mallin	Great Britain
2nd place, silver medalist(s)		Georges Prud'Homme	Canada
3rd place, bronze medalist(s)		Moe Herscovitch	Canada

The men's middleweight event was part of the boxing programme at the 1920 Summer Olympics. The weight class was the third-heaviest contested, and allowed boxers of up to 160 pounds (72.6 kilograms). The competition was held from August 21, 1920, to August 24, 1920. 17 boxers from nine nations competed.

== Results ==
Round of 32
Jean Dortet (FRA)	W
Joseph Simonon (BEL)	L

Round of 16
Martin Olsen (DEN)	W
Edward White (GBR)	L
Hjalmar Strømme (NOR)	W
Jean Dortet (FRA)	L
Georges Prud'Homme (CAN)	W
Antoine Masson (BEL)	L
Michel Rey-Golliet (FRA)	W
Georg Kruse (DEN)	L
Harry Mallin (GBR)	W
Joseph Cranston (USA)	L
Samuel Lagonia (USA)	W
Rolf Jacobsen (NOR)	L
William Bradley (RSA)	W
Jan Hesterman (NED)	L
Moe Herscovitch (CAN)	W
Paul Munting (NED)	L

Quarterfinals
Martin Olsen (DEN)	L
Hjalmar Strømme (NOR)	W
Georges Prud'Homme (CAN)	W
Michel Rey-Golliet (FRA)	L
Harry Mallin (GBR)	W
Samuel Lagonia (USA)	L
William Bradley (RSA)	L
Moe Herscovitch (CAN)	W

Semifinals
Hjalmar Strømme (NOR)	L
Georges Prud'Homme (CAN)	W
Harry Mallin (GBR)	W
Moe Herscovitch (CAN)	L

Final
Georges Prud'Homme (CAN)	L
Harry Mallin (GBR)	W
Bronze medal bout
Moe Herscovitch (CAN)	W
Hjalmar Strømme (NOR)	L

== Sources ==
- Belgium Olympic Committee (1957). Olympic Games Antwerp 1920: Official Report (in French).
- Wudarski, Pawel (1999). "Wyniki Igrzysk Olimpijskich" (in Polish).
