= James Cater =

British boxer

James Cater (3 September 1902 — 17 April 1947) was a British boxer who competed in the 1920 Summer Olympics.

Cater was born in Glasgow, Scotland, in 1902. He competed, aged 17, in the 1920 Olympics and was eliminated in the quarter-finals of the featherweight class after losing his fight to the eventual bronze medalist Edoardo Garzena.

Cater died in Glasgow in 1947, aged 44.
