= Peder Kjellberg =

Norwegian boxer (1902–1975)

Peder Kjellberg (1 August 1902 – 12 October 1975) was a Norwegian boxer who competed in the 1920 Summer Olympics. In 1920 he was eliminated in the first round of the flyweight class after losing his fight to Joseph Charpentier.
