= Adolphe Lefkowitch =

American boxer

Adolphe Lefkowitch (July 23, 1902 – April 15, 1987) was an American boxer who competed in the 1924 Summer Olympics. He was born in Newport News, Virginia. In 1924 he was eliminated in the second round of the middleweight class after losing his fight to Leslie Black.
