= Sam Vogel =

Sam Vogel may refer to:

- Sam Vogel (born 1993), known as Jauz, American DJ and music producer
- Sam Vogel (boxer) (1902–?), American Olympian
