= Boxing at the 1920 Summer Olympics – Bantamweight =

Boxing competitions

Men's bantamweight boxing at the Games of the VII Olympiad
- Venue: Antwerp Zoo auditorium
- Dates: August 21–24, 1920
- Competitors: 12 from 7 nations

Medalists
1st place, gold medalist(s)		Clarence Walker	South Africa
2nd place, silver medalist(s)		Chris Graham	Canada
3rd place, bronze medalist(s)		George McKenzie	Great Britain

The men's bantamweight event was part of the boxing programme at the 1920 Summer Olympics. The weight class was the second-lightest contested, and allowed boxers of up to 118 pounds (53.5 kilograms). The competition was held from August 21, 1920, to August 24, 1920. Twelve boxers from seven nations competed.

== Results ==
Round of 16; August 21
Clarence Walker (RSA)	W
Alfons Bouwens (BEL)	L
Edward Hartman (USA)	W
Daniel Bowling (GBR)	L
Henri Ricard (FRA)	W
Hjalmar Nygaard (NOR)	L
Sammy Vogel (USA)	W
Georges Cochon (FRA)	L

Quarterfinals; August 22
George McKenzie (GBR)	W
John Koss (NOR)	L
Clarence Walker (RSA)	W
Edward Hartman (USA)	L
Chris Graham (CAN)	W
Henri Ricard (FRA)	L
Henri Hébrans (BEL)	W
Sammy Vogel (USA)	L

Semifinals; August 23
George McKenzie (GBR)	L
Clarence Walker (RSA)	W
Chris Graham (CAN)	W
Henri Hébrans (BEL)	L

Final; August 24
Clarence Walker (RSA)	W
Chris Graham (CAN)	L
Bronze medal bout
George McKenzie (GBR)	W
Henri Hébrans (BEL)	L

== Sources ==
- Belgium Olympic Committee (1957). Olympic Games Antwerp 1920: Official Report (in French).
- Wudarski, Pawel (1999). "Wyniki Igrzysk Olimpijskich" (in Polish).
