= Øivind Jensen =

Norwegian boxer

Øivind Jensen (17 January 1905 – 9 January 1989) was a Norwegian boxer who competed in the 1924 Summer Olympics. In 1924 he was eliminated in the second round of the middleweight class after losing his fight to Harry Henning.
