= Lagonia =

Lagonia is a surname. Notable people with the surname include:

- Alyssa Lagonia (born 1989), Canadian soccer player
- Samuel Lagonia (1898–1968), American boxer
