= Moe Herscovitch =

Canadian boxer

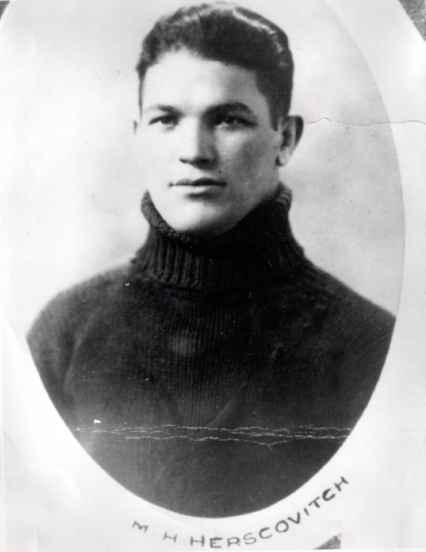

Personal information
- Nationality: Canadian
- Born: Montgomery Hart Herscovitch; 27 October 1897 Romania or Montreal
- Died: 22 July 1969 (aged 71) Montreal, Quebec, Canada
- Height: 169 cm (5 ft 7 in)
- Weight: Welterweight; Middleweight

Boxing career
- Stance: Orthodox

Boxing record
- Total fights: 27
- Wins: 11
- Win by KO: 6
- Losses: 15
- Draws: 1

Olympic medal record

Men's Boxing

Representing Canada
Bronze medal – third place	1920 Antwerp	Middleweight

Moe 'Montgomery' Hart Herscovitch (27 October 1897 – 22 July 1969) who after taking up boxing during his WWI Canadian Army service with considerable success, won a bronze medal at the 1920 Summer Olympics for Canada in Antwerp as a Middleweight. Hersovitch began his athletic career in 1913 as a prominent rugby player at fullback or flying wing for the Montreal Football Club, of the Inter-Provincial Rugby Union. After the Olympics, around 1921, he began in earnest a successful, and lucrative but relatively brief professional boxing career as a middleweight, which ended around 1924. He would later coach boxing and rugby and serve as an insurance broker beginning around 1924, later establishing his own company, Herscovitch and Sons in Montreal.

== Early life ==
Born in Romania or Canada (sources differ) to Jewish Romanian parents, Vetra 'William' and Anna Herscovitch, his parents emigrated to Montréal, Canada, where he grew up in the rough section of Griffintown, Southwest of downtown, an area that was home to a number of Irish immigrants. He anglicized his given name to 'Montgomery', but was known to everyone as 'Moe.' Around nineteen, at the time of his WWI enlistment in 1916, he was living at 1906A, St. Urbain, Montréal, Quebec, in the Griffintown area, according to his enlistment papers. Montreal's St. Urbain Street, at the turn of the century, was home to many Eastern European Jewish immigrants, though industrialization had caused portions of it to become run down, and it could still be a challenging environment, situated not far from a number of other ethnic communities.

Although somewhat short in stature at 5' 6", Herscovitch was incredibly athletic, and had blue eyes, and dark brown hair, somewhat atypical for his Eastern European Jewish ancestry. He was a standout playing football for High School of Montreal and in his Senior year was recruited to play for the Montreal Football Club in what would be known as the Big Four League of the Inter-Provincial Rugby Union. He played football with the Montreal Club until 1915 when it was disbanded due to the increasing hostilities of World War I. It would be reorganized after the war and he would play for the new team after returning from the service in 1919.

== Service in WWI ==
Eager to do his part in WWI, Herscovitch joined the 66th Battery, Canadian Expeditionary Forces as a "gunner" or private on May 8, 1916, having previously served with The Canadian Grenadier Guards. He served in England and later France and received a wound in June 1918. While posted overseas, he received training in and took up the sport of boxing, winning a number of competitions, including the Aldershot welterweight division. He was discharged from active service in October 1918, not long before the Armistice and was given leave to Paris. He was in a number of boxing tournaments and fought in Brussels, Belgium in March 1919. In April of 1919, he returned to England and was assigned for a period to the Canadian Army Gym Staff. Completing his service, he left for Canada on August 7, 1919 aboard Her Majesty's Transport Coronia.

== Rugby division champions ==
After he returned home from the War in the summer of 1919, he continued to play with the reorganized Montreal Rugby Team, known as the Winged Wheelers which won the division championships that year, but he also continued to box. When Montreal won the big four title in 1919, Moe made the vast majority of goals the club scored that season. According to one source, the team members played as amateurs, at least for most of his time with the team. Moe played for the Montreal Football Club (Rugby) in 1913, 1914, and the reorganized Winged Wheelers team in 1919, and 1920.

== 1920 Antwerp Bronze medal ==
Showing his boxing skills prior to the Olympics, on April 24, 1920, Herscovich knocked out Percy Platt in the third round at the Toronto Athletic Club in the Dominion Tournament to take the Canadian 158-pound (Middleweight) division championship, though the claim was not widely recognized.

He was selected for Canada's 1920 Olympic boxing team and assigned to its middleweight division. At Antwerp that August, he won a bronze medal, after knocking out Norwegian Hjalmar Stromme. He lost, however, to Briton Harry Mallin in the semi-final.

He married Celia Goldblatt, of Russian Jewish heritage, at Temple Beth Jhuda in Montreal around December 1921. Celia died in December of 1949, and had been active in Montreal's Adath Israel Synagogue and Hadassah, a woman's auxiliary organization. After her death in December 1949, Montreal's Cancer Research Society Unit 53 was established in her name.

== Professional boxing career ==
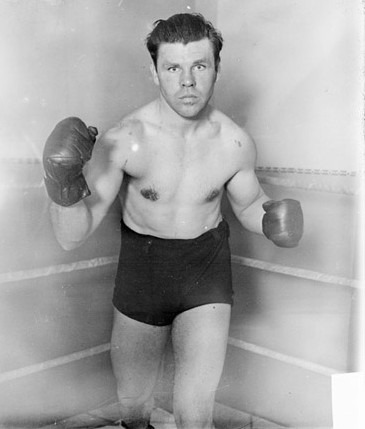
Welterweight Champ Micky Walker

Herscovitch began boxing professionally in earnest in early 1921, and defeated Olympic gold medalist Bert Schneider on 18 May 1921. He spent the next few years fighting in Canada and New York City, putting together an inconsistent record and boxing around 24 bouts. Around 1921-22, he claimed the Canadian Welterweight Championship Title, particularly during his First Round knockout win against Harlem Jimmy Kelly in New York on February 22, 1922. Against what was often stiff competition he had a career record of 9 wins, 14 losses and a draw. He beat Art Prud'homme on 8 November 1922 in a seventh-round knockout.

Moe suffered a difficult loss in his highly publicized fight against welterweight world titleholder Mickey Walker on 21 December 1923 in Toronto, in which Herscovitch was again billed as the Canadian welterweight champion. Walker won with a sixth round knockout, putting Herscovitch on the mat around five times. Other well-known boxers he faced included Eddie Shevlin, and Jimmy O'Gatty, to whom he lost, while defeating Harlem Jimmy Kelly, and "Irish" Patsy Cline decisively in first round knockouts.

== Life after boxing ==
Herscovitch retired from boxing in the summer of 1924, and began volunteering as a boxing coach at the Montreal YMHA. He began a career as an insurance broker with Sun Life around 1924, and continued in the business throughout his life. He coached football at Montreal High Montefiore, Knights of Columbus, and the Rockland Club, the intermediate champs in 1937. In 1940, he served as President of the Rockland Football (Rugby) Club.

Although he boxed at a time when fighters wore no protective gear, 'Moe' had never suffered a debilitating injury in the ring. However, on 24 July 1943 while on holiday at the summer resort of Plage Laval, he and some companions were set upon by what could be characterized as a French Canadian anti-Semitic mob and beaten so badly that surgeons were forced to later remove one of his eyes two months later. The Ottawa Journal described the conflict as a racial riot.

He continued to be actively involved in sports and his community, and served as president of the Quebec Rugby Union. Outside of sports, he worked as an insurance broker for the remainder of his life.

He died on 22 July 1969 at Montreal General Hospital, and was buried at the Baron de Hirsch Cemetery in Montreal. He was pre-deceased by his wife Celia, with whom he had two sons, and a daughter.

== Honors ==
Herscovitch was honored as a member of the Canadian Amateur Hall of Fame, and was inducted into the Canadian Olympic Hall of Fame in 1956.
