= Boxing at the 1920 Summer Olympics – Welterweight =

Boxing competitions

Men's welterweight boxing at the Games of the VII Olympiad
- Venue: Antwerp Zoo auditorium
- Dates: August 21–24, 1920
- Competitors: 18 from 10 nations

Medalists
1st place, gold medalist(s)		Bert Schneider	Canada
2nd place, silver medalist(s)		Alexander Ireland	Great Britain
3rd place, bronze medalist(s)		Frederick Kolberg	United States

The men's welterweight event was part of the boxing programme at the 1920 Summer Olympics. The weight class was the fourth-heaviest contested, and allowed boxers of up to 147 pounds (66.7 kilograms). The competition was held from August 21, 1920, to August 24, 1920. 18 boxers from ten nations competed.

The gold medal bout between Bert Schneider and Alexander Ireland ended in a draw, but the referee ordered the exhausted boxers to fight an extra round.

== Results ==
Round of 32
Aage Steen (NOR)	W
Dario Della Valle (ITA)	L
Ivan Schannong (DEN)	W
Johannes Heuckelbach (NED)	L

Round of 16
Trygve Stokstad (NOR)	W
Roy Ingram (RSA)	L
William Clark (USA)	W
Georges Werll (BEL)	L
Alexander Ireland (GBR)	W
Willy Reichenbach (SUI)	L
August Suhr (DEN)	W
René Smet (BEL)	L
Bert Schneider (CAN)	W
Joseph Thomas (RSA)	L
Aage Steen (NOR)	W
Henri Richards (FRA)	L
Léon Gillet (FRA)	W
Freddie Whitbread (GBR)	L
Frederick Kolberg (USA)	W
Ivan Schannong (DEN)	L

Quarterfinals
Trygve Stokstad (NOR)	L
William Clark (USA)	W
Alexander Ireland (GBR)	W
August Suhr (DEN)	L
Bert Schneider (CAN)	W
Aage Steen (NOR)	L
Léon Gillet (FRA)	L
Frederick Kolberg (USA)	W

Semifinals
William Clark (USA)	L
Alexander Ireland (GBR)	W
Bert Schneider (CAN)	W
Frederick Kolberg (USA)	L

Final
Alexander Ireland (GBR)	L
Bert Schneider (CAN)	W
Bronze medal bout
Frederick Kolberg (USA)	W
William Clark (USA)	L

== Sources ==
- Belgium Olympic Committee (1957). Olympic Games Antwerp 1920: Official Report (in French).
- Wudarski, Pawel (1999). "Wyniki Igrzysk Olimpijskich" (in Polish).
