= Raymond Jones (boxer) =

Australian boxer

Raymond Jones (24 September 1903 – 1978) was an Australian boxer who competed in the 1924 Summer Olympics. In 1924 he was eliminated in the first round of the middleweight class after losing his fight to Ben Funk of the US.
