= Martin Olsen (boxer) =

Danish boxer

Martin Carl Sofus Olsen (22 November 1894 – 9 July 1971) was a Danish boxer who competed in the 1920 Summer Olympics. He was born in Sundby, Copenhagen and died in Copenhagen. In 1920 he was eliminated in the quarter-finals of the middleweight class after losing his fight to Hjalmar Strømme.
