= Erich Siebert (boxer) =

Swiss boxer

Personal information
- Nationality: Swiss
- Born: 1905

Sport
- Sport: Boxing

Erich Siebert (born 1905, date of death unknown) was a Swiss boxer. He competed in the men's middleweight event at the 1924 Summer Olympics. At the 1924 Summer Olympics, he lost to Harry Mallin of Great Britain.
