= Boxing at the 1924 Summer Olympics – Middleweight =

Boxing competitions

Middleweight boxing at the Games of the VIII Olympiad
- Venue: Vélodrome d'hiver
- Dates: July 15–20, 1924
- Competitors: 23 from 15 nations

Medalists
| 1st place, gold medalist(s) | | Harry Mallin; Great Britain |
| 2nd place, silver medalist(s) | | John Elliott; Great Britain |
| 3rd place, bronze medalist(s) | | Joseph Beecken; Belgium |

The men's middleweight event was part of the boxing programme at the 1924 Summer Olympics. The weight class was the third-heaviest contested, and allowed boxers of up to 160 pounds (72.6 kilograms). The competition was held from Tuesday July 15, 1924 to Sunday July 20, 1924. Twenty-three boxers from 15 nations competed.

This competition saw one of the most controversial bouts in Olympic history, when Frenchman Roger Brousse and defending Olympic champion Harry Mallin from Great Britain faced each other in the quarterfinals. Near the end of the fight Mallin complained to the Belgian referee that Brousse had bitten him. Mallin showed the referee bite marks on his chest and shoulder. His protest was overruled by the judges and the bout was awarded to the French boxer on points (2:1). An appeal launched by Swedish official and IOC member Oscar Söderlund brought forward medical evidence that Mallin had been bitten. Manuel Gallardo also came forward with a complaint about being bitten by Brousse in their bout. Brousse was disqualified and Mallin became the winner, even though the jury declared that the foul had not been intentional. French fans had to be restrained by the police from charging the ring.

Two days later the French crowd were still incensed when Mallin boxed in the final against John Elliott. Brousse came in his boxing attire and his fans lifted him up into the ring. Only after intervention by the police were the two British opponents able to contest the final.

== Results ==
Round of 32; July 15
Harry Mallin (GBR) | PTS
Trygve Stokstad (NOR) | L
Ben Funk (USA) | PTS
Raymond Jones (AUS) | L
Daniel Daney (FRA) | KO3
Emilio Bonfigli (ITA) | L
Leslie Black (CAN) | PTS
Pierre Feidt (LUX) | L
Georges Givel (SUI) | PTS
Jules Steichen (LUX) | L
Harry Henning (CAN) | PTS
Orlando Leopardi (ITA) | L
Øivind Jensen (NOR) | PTS
Louis Meeuwessen (NED) | L

Round of 16; July 17
Roger Brousse (FRA) | PTS
Manuel Gallardo (ARG) | L
Erich Siebert (SUI) | L
Harry Mallin (GBR) | RSC2
Ben Funk (USA) | L
Joseph Beecken (BEL) | PTS
Germain Van Haelen (BEL) | L
Daniel Daney (FRA) | PTS
Leslie Black (CAN) | KO2
Adolphe Lefkowitch (USA) | L
William Murphy (IRL) | KO1
Eugeniusz Nowak (POL) | L
John Elliott (GBR) | KO1
Georges Givel (SUI) | L
Harry Henning (CAN) | RSC2
Øivind Jensen (NOR) | L

Quarterfinals; July 18
Roger Brousse (FRA) | DIS
Harry Mallin (GBR) | W
Joseph Beecken (BEL) | PTS
Daniel Daney (FRA) | L
Leslie Black (CAN) | PTS
William Murphy (IRL) | L
John Elliott (GBR) | PTS
Harry Henning (CAN) | L

Semifinals; July 19
Harry Mallin (GBR) | PTS
Joseph Beecken (BEL) | L
Leslie Black (CAN) | L
John Elliott (GBR) | PTS

Final; July 20
Harry Mallin (GBR) | PTS
John Elliott (GBR) | L
Bronze medal bout
Joseph Beecken (BEL) | W
Leslie Black (CAN) | w/o
