= Charles Albert (boxer) =

French boxer

Personal information
- Nationality: French
- Born: 27 September 1903 Karelichy, Russian Empire
- Died: 21 April 1986 (aged 82) New York City, USA

Sport
- Sport: Boxing

Charles Albert was a French boxer. He competed in the men's flyweight event at the 1920 Summer Olympics. He was born in Karelichy, Russian Empire (now Belarus) but he grew up in France. At the 1920 Summer Olympics, he defeated Vincenzo Dell'Oro of Italy, before losing to Joseph Charpentier of Belgium.
