= Peter Zivic =

American boxer

Peter B. Zivic (March 26, 1901 – January 29, 1987) was an American boxer who competed in the 1920 Summer Olympics. He was born in Pittsburgh, Pennsylvania and was the older brother of Jack Zivic. In 1920, he was eliminated in the quarter-finals of the flyweight class after losing his fight to the upcoming silver medalist Anders Pedersen.
