= Ted Zegwaard =

Dutch boxer (1903–1952)

Personal information
- Full name: Nicolaas Leonard Zegwaard
- Nickname(s): Jan van Houten, Ted Derwetter
- Born: 15 October 1903; Amsterdam, Netherlands
- Died: 1 November 1952 (aged 49); Durban, South Africa

Sport
- Sport: Boxing

Nicolaas Leonard "Ted" Zegwaard (15 October 1903 – 1 November 1952) was a Dutch boxer who competed in the 1920 Summer Olympics.

Zegwaard was born as the youngest child of Nicolaas Leonard Zegwaard, a diamond cutter in Amsterdam, and Hendrika Margaretha Langelaan.

In 1920 he was eliminated in the quarter-finals of the flyweight class. In the first round he won his fight against Frederic Virtue but he lost his next bout to the upcoming bronze medalist William Cuthbertson.

Zegwaard became professional some time after the Olympics. In September 1926 he moved to Australia. In March 1931 he returned to Amsterdam from Sydney, listing boxer as his profession, but in December 1935, now a worstelaar ("wrestler"), he left again for Sydney. Not able to obtain permanent residence or citizenship, he eventually moved to South Africa. In his later career he also went by the name "Jan van Houten".
