= Rolf Jacobsen =

Rolf Jacobsen may refer to:

- Rolf Jacobsen (poet) (1907–1994), Norwegian modernist writer
- Rolf Jacobsen (politician) (1865–1942), Norwegian jurist and politician
- Rolf Jacobsen (boxer) (1899–1960), Norwegian boxer
