= Manuel Gallardo (boxer) =

Argentine boxer

Manuel Alberto Gallardo Massey (13 June 1900 – 25 January 1973) was an Argentine boxer who competed in the 1924 Summer Olympics. In 1924 he was eliminated in the second round of the middleweight class after losing his fight to Roger Brousse.
