= Germain Van Haelen =

Belgian boxer

Germain Van Haelen (9 August 1899 – 21 January 1958) was a Belgian boxer who competed in the 1924 Summer Olympics. In 1924, he was eliminated in the second round of the middleweight class after losing to Daniel Daney.
