= Boxing at the 1920 Summer Olympics – Flyweight =

Men's flyweight boxing at the Games of the VII Olympiad
- Venue: Antwerp Zoo auditorium
- Dates: August 21–24, 1920
- Competitors: 16 from 9 nations

Medalists
1st place, gold medalist(s)		Frankie Genaro	United States
2nd place, silver medalist(s)		Anders Pedersen	Denmark
3rd place, bronze medalist(s)		William Cuthbertson	Great Britain

The men's flyweight event was part of the boxing programme at the 1920 Summer Olympics. The weight class was the lightest contested, and allowed boxers of up to 112 pounds (50.8 kilograms). The competition was held from August 21, 1920, to August 24, 1920. 16 boxers from nine nations competed.

== Results ==
Round of 16; August 21
Frankie Genaro (USA)	W
Einar Nilsen (NOR)	L
Jean-B. Rampignon (FRA)	W
Harry Turner (CAN)	L
Joseph Charpentier (BEL)	W
Peder Kjellberg (NOR)	L
Charles Albert (FRA)	W
Vincenzo Dell'Oro (ITA)	L
William Cuthbertson (GBR)	W
Einer Jensen (DEN)	L
Ted Zegwaard (NED)	W
Frederic Virtue (GBR)	L
Anders Pedersen (DEN)	W
Nelis van Dijk (NED)	L
Peter Zivic (USA)	W
Jules Androt (BEL)	L

Quarterfinals; August 22
Genaro (USA)	W
Rampignon (FRA)	L
Charpentier (BEL)	L
Albert (FRA)	W
Cuthbertson (GBR)	W
Zegwaard (NED)	L
Pedersen (DEN)	W
Zivic (USA)	L

Semifinals; August 23
Genaro (USA)	W
Albert (FRA)	L
Cuthbertson (GBR)	L
Pedersen (DEN)	W

Final; August 24
Genaro (USA)	W
Pedersen (DEN)	L
Bronze medal bout
Cuthbertson (GBR)	W
Albert (FRA)	L

== Sources ==
- Belgium Olympic Committee (1957). Olympic Games Antwerp 1920: Official Report (in French).
- Wudarski, Pawel (1999). "Wyniki Igrzysk Olimpijskich" (in Polish).
