= Orlando Leopardi =

Italian boxer

Orlando Leopardi (11 January 1902 in Rome – 1 August 1972) was an Italian boxer who competed in the 1924 Summer Olympics. In 1924 he was eliminated in the first round of the middleweight class after losing his fight to Harry Henning.
