= William Rankin (disambiguation) =

William Rankin may refer to:

- William Rankin (1920–2009), aviator and the only known survivor of falling through a thunderstorm cloud
- William Rankin (screenwriter) (1900–1966), American screenwriter of I've Got Your Number
- William Rankin (Medal of Honor), on List of Medal of Honor recipients for the Indian Wars
- William Rankin (boxer) (1898–1967), Scottish-Canadian featherweight boxer
- William Boyd Rankin, cricketer
- Willie Rankin (footballer, born 1895) (1895–1950), Scottish footballer with Motherwell, Cowdenbeath, Clyde
- Willie Rankin (footballer, born 1900) (1900–1968), Scottish footballer with Dundee, Blackburn, Charlton

== See also ==
- Macquorn Rankine (William John Macquorn Rankine, 1820–1872), Scottish engineer
- William Rankins (fl. 1590s), English writer
