= Dario Della Valle =

Italian boxer

Dario Della Valle (31 March 1899 – 1944) was an Italian boxer who competed in the 1920 Summer Olympics. In 1920 he was eliminated in the first round of the welterweight class after losing his fight to Aage Steen.
