= Nelis van Dijk =

Dutch boxer

Cornelis "Nelis" van Dijk (8 January 1904 – 31 October 1969) was a Dutch boxer who competed in the 1920 Summer Olympics. He was born in Gouda and died in Rotterdam. In 1920 he eliminated in the first round of the flyweight class after losing his fight to the upcoming silver medalist Anders Pedersen.
