= Joseph Cranston =

American boxer

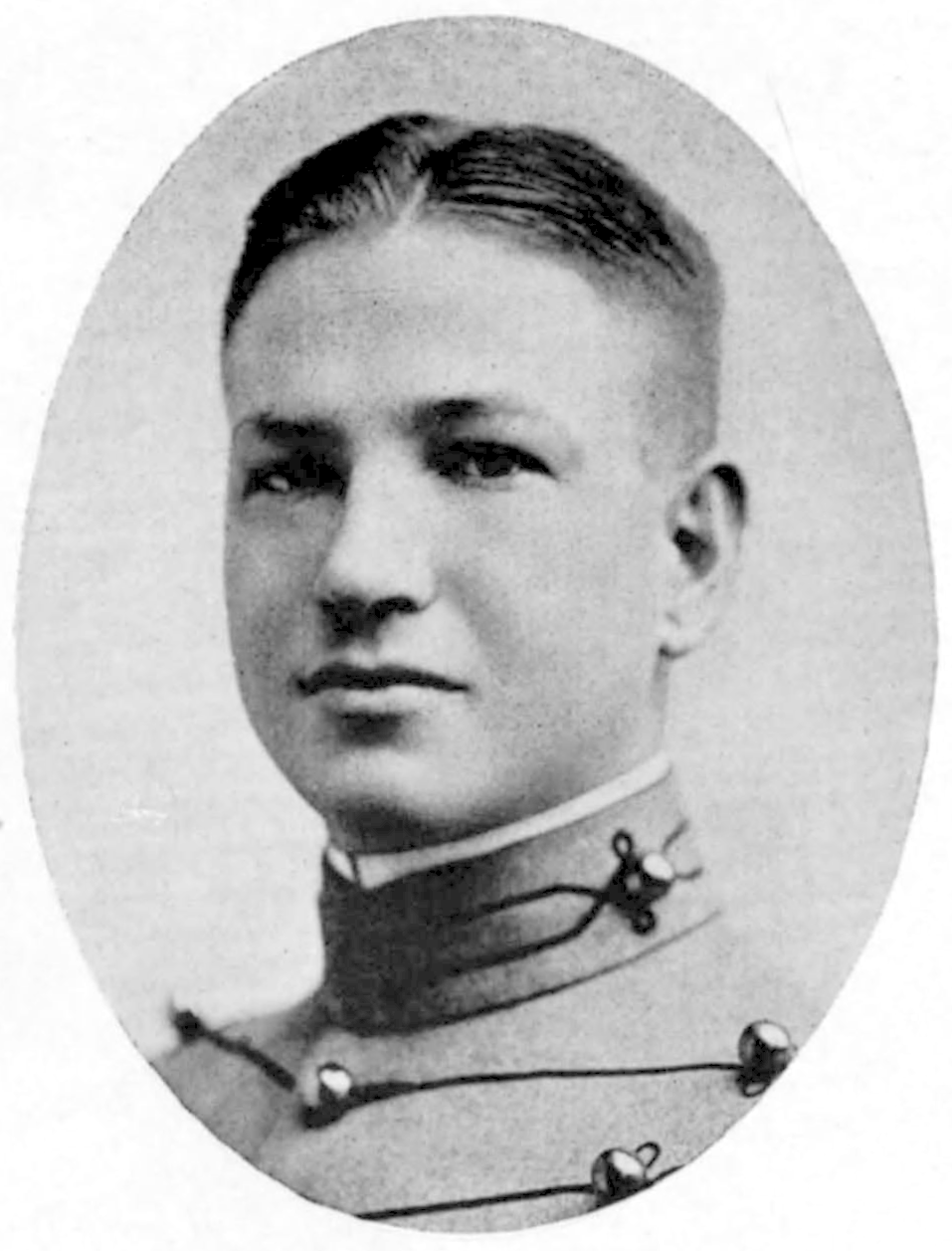
- As a West Point cadet
- Born: Joseph Alfred Cranston; September 8, 1898; Leavenworth, Kansas
- Died: December 2, 1973 (aged 75); Washington, D.C.
- Burial place: Arlington National Cemetery
- Occupations: Boxer, military officer

Joseph Alfred Cranston (September 8, 1898 – December 2, 1973) was an American military officer and boxer who competed in the 1920 Summer Olympics. He was eliminated in the second round of the middleweight class after losing to the eventual gold medalist Harry Mallin.

== Biography ==
Joseph Cranston was born in Leavenworth, Kansas on September 8, 1898. He attended Leavenworth High School, and graduated from the United States Military Academy at West Point on November 1, 1918, after which he was commissioned as a second lieutenant in the Army. He was promoted to brigadier general during World War II. For his service in the China Burma India Theater, he received the Distinguished Service Medal, Bronze Star, and Chinese Order of the Cloud and Banner. He retired from the Army on July 31, 1948.

He died at Walter Reed Army Medical Center on December 2, 1973, and was buried at Arlington National Cemetery.
