= Eugeniusz Nowak =

Polish boxer

Eugeniusz Bronisław Nowak (30 December 1895 – 31 March 1988) was a Polish boxer who competed in the 1924 Summer Olympics. He was born in Kraków and died in Pabianice. In 1924 he was eliminated in the second round of the middleweight class after losing his bout to William Murphy.
