= Alexander Ireland (boxer) =

Scottish boxer

Alex Ireland
Personal information
- Nationality: Scottish
- Born: Alexander Ramsay Ireland; 10 April 1901 Leith, Scotland
- Died: 24 January 1966 (aged 64)
- Weight: welter/middleweight

Boxing career

Boxing record
- Total fights: 29
- Wins: 17 (KO 3)
- Losses: 9 (KO 31)
- Draws: 3
Medal record
Men's Boxing
Representing Great Britain
Olympic Games
Silver medal – second place	1920 Antwerp	Welterweight

Alexander Ramsay "Alex" Ireland (10 April 1901 – 25 January 1966) was a Scottish amateur and professional welter/middleweight boxer of the 1920s and 1930s. He fought under the name of Alex Ireland.

== Biography ==
Ireland won the 1921 Amateur Boxing Association British welterweight title, when boxing out of the United Scottish BC.

He won a silver medal in the welterweight boxing at the 1920 Summer Olympics in Antwerp, Belgium losing to Canadian boxer Bert Schneider in the final, and the Scottish Area welterweight title, the National Sporting Club (NSC) (subsequently known as the British Boxing Board of Control (BBBofC)) British middleweight title, British Empire middleweight title, and European Boxing Union (EBU) middleweight title. He was a challenger for the Scottish Area middleweight title and his professional fighting weight varied from 146 lb (66 kg; 10 st 6 lb), i.e. welterweight to 151 lb (68.5 kg; 10 st 11.0 lb), i.e. middleweight. He was born in Leith.

=== Olympic games results ===
1920 (as a welterweight)

- 1st round bye
- Defeated Willy Reichenbach (Switzerland)
- Defeated August Suhr (Denmark)
- Defeated William Clark (United States)
- Lost to Bert Schneider (Canada)
