= Philippe Bovy =

Belgian boxer

Philippe Charles Bovy (8 May 1902 – 27 May 1961) was a Belgian boxer and Olympian. He competed in the 1920 Olympic Summer Games in Antwerp. In the Men's featherweight tournament, he was awarded a bye in the Round of 32, defeated Wim Hesterman in the Round of 16, but was eliminated in the quarterfinals by Jean Gachet of France.

Bovy was born in Liège on 8 May 1902.
