= Bert Schneider (boxer) =

Canadian boxer

Olympic medal record

Men's boxing

Representing Canada
Gold medal – first place	1920 Antwerp	Welterweight

Julius Gustav Albert "Bert" Schneider (July 1, 1897 – February 20, 1986) was an American-born Canadian welterweight boxer who competed in the early 1920s.

He was born in Cleveland, Ohio, United States, was raised in Montreal, and was Jewish.

Schneider's greatest success was as an amateur, winning the welterweight gold medal in boxing at the 1920 Summer Olympics with a win over British boxer Alexander Ireland in the final. Schneider was the first Canadian to win an Olympic boxing gold medal. Only two other Canadian boxers have achieved that feat in all the years since: Horace Gwynne in 1932 and Lennox Lewis in 1988.

== Olympic results ==
The following matches were fought by gold medallist Bert Schneider at the 1920 Antwerp Olympics:

- Round of 32: bye
- Round of 16: defeated Joseph Thomas (South Africa)
- Quarterfinal: defeated Aage Steen (Norway)
- Semifinal: defeated Frederick Colberg (USA)
- Final: defeated Alexander Ireland (Great Britain) - won gold medal

All matches were contested between August 21 and 24, 1920 at the Amphitheater of the Antwerp Zoo.

== Pro career ==
He turned professional early the next year. According to BoxRec.com, his career record as a professional was 17-17-2 with 6 KOs.

== Honors ==
Schneider is a member of Canada's Sports Hall of Fame.
