= Joseph Vincken =

Belgian boxer

Personal information
- Nationality: Belgian
- Born: 20 December 1900 Kerkrade, Limburg, Netherlands

Sport
- Sport: Boxing

Joseph Vincken (born 20 December 1900, date of death unknown) was a Belgian boxer. He competed in the men's featherweight event at the 1920 Summer Olympics.
