= Walter Newton (boxer) =

Canadian boxer

Personal information
- Born: 2 January 1902 Toronto, Ontario, Canada
- Died: 19 October 1945 (aged 43) Chicago, Illinois, United States

Sport
- Sport: Boxing

Walter Newton (2 January 1902 – 19 October 1945) was a Canadian boxer. He competed in the men's featherweight event at the 1920 Summer Olympics. At the 1920 Antwerp Summer Olympics, he received a bye in the Round of 32 and then lost in the Round of 16 to Nick Clausen of Denmark.
