= Jean Dortet =

French boxer

Personal information
- Nationality: French
- Born: 26 February 1903 La Rochelle, France
- Died: 6 March 1984 (aged 81) Pau, Pyrénées-Atlantiques, France

Sport
- Sport: Boxing

Jean Dortet (26 February 1903 – 6 March 1984) was a French boxer. He competed in the men's middleweight event at the 1920 Summer Olympics.
