= Edward Hartman (boxer) =

American boxer

Edward Earl Hartman (March 10, 1899 – March 5, 1974) was an American boxer who competed in the 1920 Summer Olympics. In 1920, he was eliminated in the quarterfinals of the bantamweight class after losing to the upcoming gold medalist Clarence Walker. Hartman was born in Philadelphia.
