= Arthur Prud'Homme =

Canadian boxer

Art Prud'Homme
Personal information
- Full name: Joseph Arthur Prud'Homme
- Born: March 12, 1898 Ottawa, Ontario, Canada
- Died: January 7, 1978 (aged 79) Athabasca, Alberta, Canada

Sport
- Sport: Boxing
- Weight class: Middleweight
Medal record
Men's Boxing
Representing Canada
Silver medal – second place	1920 Antwerp	Middleweight

Joseph Arthur Prud'Homme (March 12, 1898 – January 7, 1978) was a Canadian middleweight boxer who competed in the early 1920s.

He won a silver medal at the 1920 Summer Olympics, losing to British boxer Harry Mallin in the final. Prud'Homme later moved to Plamondon, Alberta and died in Athabasca, Alberta in 1978.

== Olympic record ==
Here is Georges Prud'Hommes' record at the 1920 Antwerp Olympics where he competed as a middleweight boxer:

- Round of 16: defeated Antoine Masson (Belgium)
- Quarterfinal: defeated Marcel Rey-Golliet (France)
- Semifinal: defeated Hjalmar Strømme (Norway)
- Final: lost to Harry Mallin (Great Britain); Prud'Homme awarded the silver medal
