= Johannes Heuckelbach =

Dutch boxer

Johannes Hendricus Heuckelbach (5 March 1893, Amsterdam – 18 June 1976, Amsterdam) was a Dutch boxer who competed in the 1920 Summer Olympics. In 1920 he was eliminated in the first round of the welterweight class after losing his fight to Ivan Schannong of Denmark.
