= George McKenzie (boxer) =

Scottish boxer

Personal information
- Nationality: British (Scottish)
- Born: 22 September 1900 Leith, Edinburgh, Scotland
- Died: 5 April 1941 (aged 40) Leith, Edinburgh, Scotland

Sport
- Sport: boxing
Medal record
Representing Great Britain
Men's Boxing
| Bronze medal – third place | 1920 Antwerp | Bantamweight |

George McKenzie (22 September 1900 – 5 April 1941) was a Scottish bantamweight professional boxer who competed in the 1920s. His brother James MacKenzie, a flyweight, won Olympic silver in 1924 in Paris. He was born in Leith.

== Amateur career ==
McKenzie won the 1920 Amateur Boxing Association British bantamweight title, when boxing out of the United Scottish ABC. Later that year, he won a bronze medal in Boxing at the 1920 Summer Olympics losing against boxer Clarence Walker in the semi-finals.

=== Olympic results ===
Below is the record of George McKenzie, a British bantamweight boxer who competed at the 1920 Antwerp Olympics:

- Round of 16: bye
- Quarterfinal: defeated John Koss (Norway)
- Semifinal: lost to Clarence Walker (South Africa)
- Bronze Medal Bout: defeated Henri Hebrants (Belgium)

== Pro career ==
He fought professionally from 1922 to 1929 and is credited with a record of 36 - 7 - 2.

== See also ==
- List of British featherweight boxing champions
