= Henri Richards =

French boxer

Personal information
- Nationality: French

Sport
- Sport: Boxing

Henri Richards was a French boxer. He competed in the men's welterweight event at the 1920 Summer Olympics.
