= Trygve Stokstad =

Norwegian boxer

Trygve Stokstad (25 November 1902 – 26 April 1979) was a Norwegian boxer who competed in the 1920 Summer Olympics and in the 1924 Summer Olympics.

In 1920, he was eliminated in the quarter-finals of the welterweight class after losing his fight to William Clark. Four years later, he was eliminated in the first round of the middleweight class after losing to Harry Mallin, who was on his way to winning his second consecutive Olympic gold medal.
