= Daniel Bowling =

British boxer

Personal information
- Nationality: British
- Born: 13 February 1899 Ratcliff, England
- Died: 22 December 1973 (aged 74) Stepney, England

Sport
- Sport: Boxing

Daniel Bowling (13 February 1899 – 22 December 1973) was a British boxer. He competed in the men's bantamweight event at the 1920 Summer Olympics.
