= George Etcell =

American boxer

Personal information
- Born: April 2, 1898 New York, New York, United States
- Died: April 6, 1965 (aged 67) Los Angeles, California, United States

Sport
- Sport: Boxing

George Etcell (April 2, 1898 – April 6, 1965) was an American boxer. He competed in the men's featherweight event at the 1920 Summer Olympics. After the attack on Pearl Harbor, Etcell was awarded the Navy Cross.
