= Jan Hesterman =

Dutch boxer

Jan Hesterman (18 March 1893, Amsterdam – 16 December 1963, Amsterdam) was a Dutch boxer who competed in the 1920 Summer Olympics. In 1920 he was eliminated in the second round of the middleweight class after losing his fight to William Bradley.

He was the older brother of Wim Hesterman and Catharina Hesterman.
