= Jules Steichen =

Luxembourgish boxer

Personal information
- Nationality: Luxembourgish
- Born: 7 June 1902; Audun-le-Tiche, France
- Died: 4 August 1977 (aged 75); Esch-sur-Alzette, Luxembourg

Sport
- Sport: Boxing

Jules Steichen (7 June 1902 – 4 August 1977) was a Luxembourgish boxer. He competed in the men's middleweight event at the 1924 Summer Olympics.
