= John Koss =

Norwegian boxer

John Koss (12 June 1895 – 27 March 1925) was a Norwegian boxer who competed in the 1920 Summer Olympics. In 1920 he was eliminated in the quarter-finals of the bantamweight class after losing his fight to the upcoming bronze medalist George McKenzie.
