= Anders Petersen =

Anders Petersen may refer to:

- Anders Petersen (photographer) (born 1944), Swedish photographer
- Anders Petersen (boxer) (1902–1966), Danish boxer who competed in the 1920s
- Anders Petersen (sport shooter) (1876–1968), Danish sport shooter Olympic champion
- Anders Petersen (historian) (1827–1914), Danish teacher and historian
- Anders H. Petersen, Greenlandic footballer who played for B-67 and the Greenland national football team in the 2006 ELF Cup

== See also ==
- Anders Peterson (born 1965), Swedish swimmer
