= Aage Steen =

Norwegian boxer

Aage Torstein Wetterland Steen (January 15, 1900 – February 28, 1982) was a Norwegian boxer who competed in the 1920 Summer Olympics. At the Olympics, he was eliminated in the quarterfinals of the welterweight class after losing his fight to the eventual gold medalist Bert Schneider.

He was born in Vadsø. He moved to Trondhjem, training under the British coach Arbuckle in the SK Brage sports club. In the spring of 1920 he became Norwegian champion in welterweight, and was named as a part of the Norwegian Olympic boxing squad. Before the Olympics, most of the squad faced each other in exhibition matches at Frogner stadion. Steen beat Trygve Stokstad before fighting middleweight Rolf Jacobsen.

At the Olympics, he defeated Dario Della Valle (Italy) in the round of 32 and then Henn Richards (France) in the round of 16. In the quarter-final, Steen lost to Bert Schneider (Canada). P. Chr. Andersen reported for Aftenposten that Schneider's victory was "a much disputed decision". This was later expanded upon by Dagsposten. First, Della Valle came on the defensive after four left jabs in the first round, whereas Richards could not withstand a couple of right hooks in the third round. "Steen safely took the first round home, whereas the second and third were tighter, and the victory was obviously Steen's, but what happens then, the referees acknowledge Schneider, who absolutely had the lower hand, as the victor. The audience protested vividly, but to what end, the referees' decision is unassailable".

In 1921, Steen won the King's Cup, as the best boxer across all weight classes at the Norwegian championships.

Steen spent his working career in Namsos. Representing the Namsos sports club, he won the silver medal in middleweight at the 1930 Norwegian championships and thereafter vowed to retire.
