= Joseph Simonon =

Belgian boxer (born 1897)

Personal information
- Nationality: Belgian
- Born: 3 November 1897

Sport
- Sport: Boxing

Joseph Simonon (born 3 November 1897, date of death unknown) was a Belgian boxer. He competed in the men's middleweight event at the 1920 Summer Olympics.
