= John Elliott (British boxer) =

British boxer and war correspondent

Jack Elliott
Personal information
- Full name: John Elliott
- Nationality: British (English)
- Born: 12 October 1901 Hoxton, London, England
- Died: 3 July 1945 (aged 43) Balikpapan, Indonesia

Sport
- Sport: Boxing
Medal record
Men's Boxing
Representing Great Britain
Olympic Games
Silver medal – second place	1924 Paris	Middleweight

John "Jack" Elliott (12 October 1901 – 3 July 1945) was a British middleweight boxer who competed in the 1920s.

== Biography ==
Elliott won a silver medal in boxing at the 1924 Summer Olympics in Paris, losing against the successful British boxer Harry Mallin in the final bout. He won the Amateur Boxing Association 1924 and 1925 middleweight title, when boxing out of the Polytechnic Boxing Club.

At some point following his Olympic appearance, Elliott emigrated to Australia. On 8 April 1941, a year-and-a-half after the outbreak of the Second World War, he enlisted in the Australian Army in Paddington, New South Wales, giving his residence as Sydney. He was discharged as a staff sergeant in 1943 and became a war correspondent. On 3 July 1945, while covering the invasion of Balikpapan with fellow journalist William Smith, Elliott went ahead of the advancing Australian troops; a Bren gunner, believing them to be Japanese troops, shot and killed them both.
