= Georges Cochon (boxer) =

French boxer

Personal information
- Nationality: French

Sport
- Sport: Boxing

Georges Cochon was a French boxer. He competed in the men's bantamweight event at the 1920 Summer Olympics.
