= Chris Graham (boxer) =

Canadian boxer

Olympic medal record

Men's Boxing

Representing Canada
Silver medal – second place	1920 Antwerp	Bantamweight

Clifford "Chris" J. Graham (18 March 1900 – 24 May 1986) was a Canadian boxer, born in Toronto, who competed in the 1920s. As a bantamweight, he won the silver medal at the 1920 Summer Olympics, losing to Clarence Walker in the final. Four years later in Paris, he once again represented his native country at the Summer Olympics. This time, he was eliminated in the second round of the lightweight class after losing his fight to Ben Rothwell. Graham was affiliated with the Riverside Athletic Club of Toronto.

== 1920 Olympic results ==
Below is the record of Chris Graham, a Canadian bantamweight boxer who competed at the 1920 Antwerp Olympics:

- Round of 16: bye
- Quarterfinal: defeated Henri Ricard (France)
- Semifinal: defeated Henri Hébrans (Belgium)
- Final: lost to Clarence Walker (South Africa) - was awarded silver medal

== Professional career ==
Graham later fought professionally in Canada, and the highlight of his pro career came on January 10, 1927, when he became the Canadian lightweight champion. He was later defeated and lost the belt to his former Olympic teammate Clarence Newton.
