= Vincenzo Dell'Oro =

Italian boxer

Pietro Dell'Oro (5 September 1895 – 24 November 1952) was an Italian boxer who competed in the 1920 Summer Olympics. In 1920, he was eliminated in the first round of the flyweight class after losing his fight to Charles Albert.

Dell'Oro was born in Milan on 5 September 1895. He died there on 24 November 1952, at the age of 57.
