= William Cuthbertson =

Scottish boxer (1902–1963)

Personal information
- Born: 21 June 1902 Dunfermline, Scotland
- Died: 24 November 1963 (aged 61) Dunfermline, Scotland

Sport
- Sport: Boxing
Medal record
Men's Boxing
Representing Great Britain
Olympic Games
Bronze medal – third place	1920 Antwerp	Flyweight

William Cuthbertson (21 July 1902 in Dunfermline – 24 November 1963) was a British flyweight boxer who competed in the 1920s. He won the bronze medal in Boxing at the 1920 Summer Olympics losing against Danish boxer Anders Petersen in the semi-finals.

== Boxing career ==
Cuthbertson won the 1921 Amateur Boxing Association British flyweight title, when boxing out of the United Scottish BC.

=== 1920 Olympic result ===
- Round of 16: defeated Einer Jensen (Denmark)
- Quarterfinal: defeated Ted Zegwaard (Netherlands)
- Semifinal: lost to Anders Pedersen (Denmark)
- Bronze-Medal Bout: defeated Charles Albert (France); was awarded bronze medal
