= Ben Funk =

American boxer

Benjamin Franklin Funk (December 6, 1902 – November 24, 1969) was an American boxer who competed in the 1924 Summer Olympics. In 1924, Funk was eliminated in the second round of the middleweight class after losing his fight to the eventual bronze medalist Joseph Beecken.

Funk was born and died Bloomington, Illinois, and was a 1925 graduate of Yale University.
