= Léon Gillet =

French boxer

Personal information
- Nationality: French
- Born: 15 September 1896 Paris, France
- Died: 2 May 1974 (aged 77) Paris, France

Sport
- Sport: Boxing

Léon Gillet (15 September 1896 – 2 May 1974) was a French boxer. He competed in the men's welterweight event at the 1920 Summer Olympics.
