= Hjalmar Nygaard (boxer) =

Norwegian boxer

Hjalmar Nygaard (12 June 1900 – died 29 October 1936 in Boston) was a Norwegian boxer who competed in the 1920 Summer Olympics. In 1920, he was eliminated in the first round of the bantamweight class after losing his fight to Henri Ricard. Nygaard moved to Boston in 1923 and worked as a bookbinder. He died after falling while painting a house.
