= Sammy Vogel =

American boxer

Samuel Vogel (July 28, 1902 – February 1971) was an American boxer who competed in the 1920 Summer Olympics. In 1920, he was eliminated in the quarterfinals of the bantamweight class after losing to Henri Hébrans.
