= Einar Nilsen =

Norwegian boxer (1901–1980)

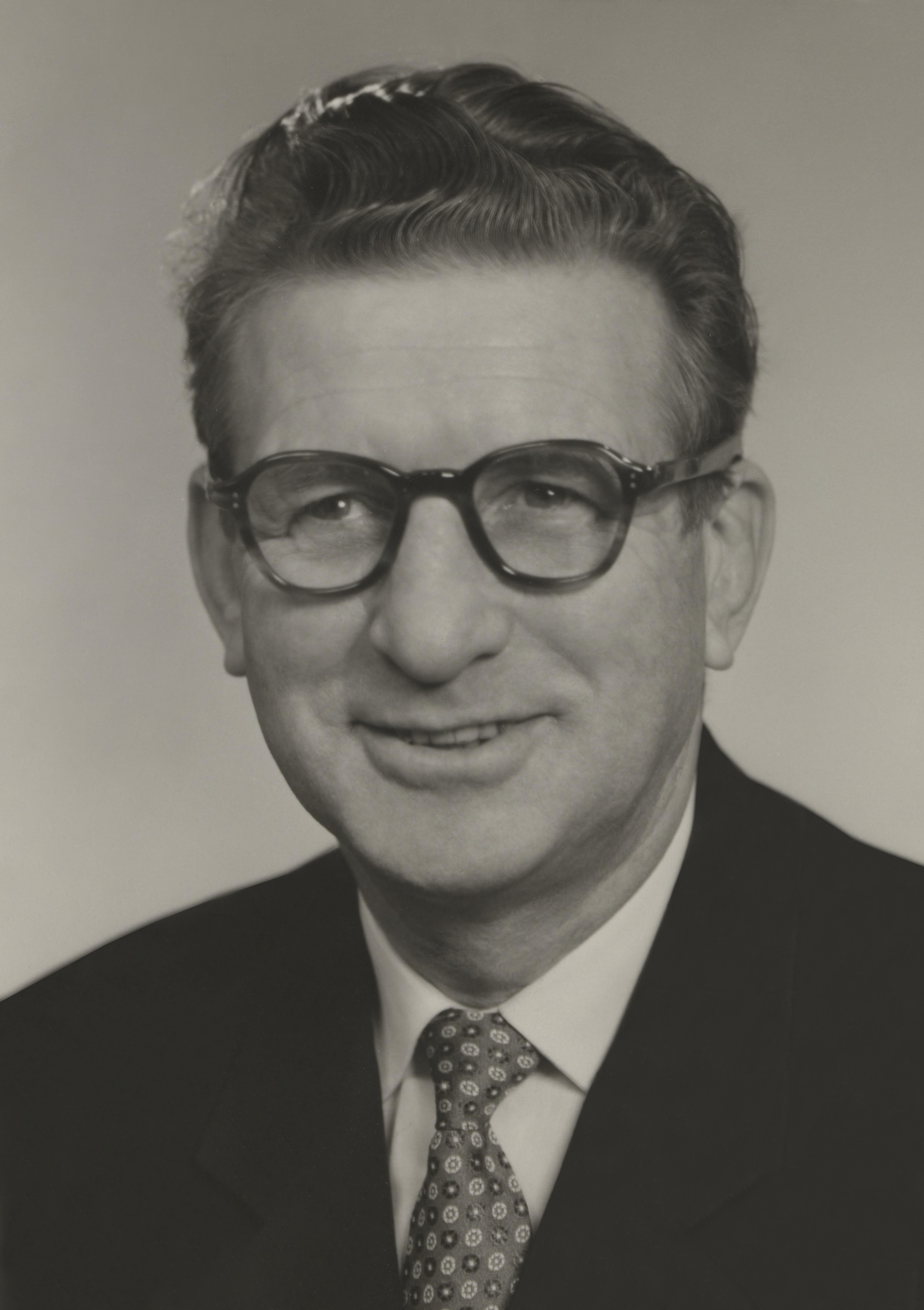
Einar Nilsen (1961)

Einar Nilsen (later Skar, 18 November 1901 – 29 March 1980) was a Norwegian boxer who competed in the 1920 Summer Olympics. He was born in Drammen and died in Lier.

In 1920, he was eliminated in the first round of the flyweight class after losing his fight to the upcoming gold medalist Frankie Genaro.
