= Edward White (boxer) =

British boxer

Personal information
- Nationality: British
- Born: 3 December 1899; Leyton, London
- Died: January 1984 (aged 84); Gravesend, Kent

Sport
- Sport: Boxing

Edward White (3 December 1899 – January 1984) was a British boxer. He competed in the men's middleweight event at the 1920 Summer Olympics. He fought under the name Ted White.

White won the 1922 Amateur Boxing Association British welterweight title, when boxing out of the Limehouse & Polar ABC.
