= Pierre Feidt =

Luxembourgish boxer

Personal information
- Nationality: Luxembourgish
- Born: 13 January 1904

Sport
- Sport: Boxing

Pierre Feidt (born 13 January 1904, date of death unknown) was a Luxembourgish boxer. He competed in the men's middleweight event at the 1924 Summer Olympics.
