= Georges Werll =

Belgian boxer

Victor Werll
Personal information
- Full name: Victor Alexandre Werll
- Nationality: Belgian
- Born: 19 September 1895; Liège, Belgium

Sport
- Sport: Boxing

Victor Werll (born 19 September 1895) was a Belgian boxer. He competed in the men's welterweight event at the 1920 Summer Olympics.
