= William Murphy (boxer) =

Irish boxer (1903–1979)

Personal information
- Nationality: Irish
- Born: 4 September 1903; Murree, British India
- Died: 25 November 1979 (aged 76); Waterford, Ireland

Sport
- Sport: boxing

William John "Boy" Murphy (4 September 1903 – 25 November 1979) was an Irish boxer who competed in the 1924 Summer Olympics and the 1928 Summer Olympics.

At the 1924 Summer Olympics he was eliminated in the quarter-finals of the middleweight class after losing his fight to Leslie Black. Four years later at the 1928 Summer Olympics he was eliminated in the quarter-finals of the light heavyweight class after losing his fight to the upcoming silver medalist Ernst Pistulla.

Murphy won the Amateur Boxing Association of England 1930 light heavyweight title.
