= Alfons Bouwens =

Belgian boxer

Personal information
- Nationality: Belgian

Sport
- Sport: Boxing

Alfons Bouwens was a Belgian boxer. He competed in the men's bantamweight event at the 1920 Summer Olympics. At the 1920 Summer Olympics, he lost to Clarence Walker of South Africa.
