= Joseph Beecken =

Belgian boxer (1904–1948)

Olympic medal record

Men's Boxing

Representing Belgium
| Bronze medal – third place | 1924 Paris | Middleweight |

Joseph Jules Beecken (5 April 1904 – 5 February 1948) was a Belgian middleweight boxer who competed in the 1920s. He won the bronze medal in boxing at the 1924 Summer Olympics in the middleweight category, losing against John Elliott in the semi-final. He won the bronze medal bout against Leslie Black.
