= Daniel Daney =

French boxer

Daniel Daney (10 February 1905 – 25 December 1985) was a French boxer who competed in the 1924 Summer Olympics. In 1924 he was eliminated in the quarterfinals of the middleweight class after losing to the upcoming bronze medalist Joseph Beecken.
