= Frederic Virtue =

English boxer

Frederic Walter Virtue (5 December 1896 – 4 October 1985) was a British boxer who competed in the 1920 Summer Olympics. He was born in Bermondsey and died in Southwark. In 1920, he was eliminated in the first round of the flyweight class after losing his fight to Ted Zegwaard.
