= Georges Givel =

Swiss boxer

Personal information
- Nationality: Swiss
- Born: 1901

Sport
- Sport: Boxing

Georges Givel (born 1901, date of death unknown) was a Swiss boxer. He competed in the men's middleweight event at the 1924 Summer Olympics.
