= Johannes Overå =

- Born: 17 July 1899; Hareid Municipality, Norway
- Died: 1989 (aged 89–90)

Johannes Overå (17 July 1899 – 1989) was a Norwegian shipper and administrator of fisheries.

He was born in Hareid Municipality to shipper Johan Overå and Augusta Moltudal. Overå was assigned at the Norwegian Directorate of Fisheries from 1932 to 1938, and served as Fisheries Inspector of Møre og Romsdal in 1938. He was appointed CEO of Norges Råfisklag from 1939.

In 1940, during the German occupation of Norway he signed a favorable contract for delivering 150,000 tons of fish to new freezing plants administrated by the occupants. In the legal purge in Norway after World War II he was acquitted for providing support to the enemy, but was fined for having signed an appeal against Soviet submarine activities along the coast of Northern Norway.
