= William Clark (boxer) =

American boxer, born 1899

William C. Clark (ne Oistacher; October 8, 1899 – March 21, 1988) was an American boxer who competed in the 1920 Summer Olympics. Clark was affiliated with the Hermann Institute of Philadelphia. He died in Miami, Florida.

In 1920 he finished fourth in the welterweight class after losing the bronze medal bout to Frederick Kolberg.
