= Harry Turner (boxer) =

Canadian boxer

Personal information
- Born: 27 September 1894; Montreal, Quebec, Canada
- Died: 19 October 1976 (aged 82); Montreal, Quebec, Canada

Sport
- Sport: Boxing

Harry Turner (27 September 1894 – 19 October 1976) was a Canadian boxer. He competed in the men's flyweight event at the 1920 Summer Olympics.
