= Oran B. Hesterman =

Oran B. Hesterman is the president and chief executive officer of Fair Food Network, a non-profit organization based in Ann Arbor Michigan, is a national leader in sustainable agriculture and food systems and the author of Fair Food: Growing a Healthy, Sustainable Food System for All (Public Affairs), as well as more than 400 reports and articles on subjects such as cover crops, crop rotation, and the impact of philanthropic investments on food systems practice and policy.

Since its release, Fair Food has garnered a significant amount of attention, with over 4,000 food and social justice activists attending book events nationwide in 2011. Beyond listing the health, environment, and economic dysfunctions of the current broken American food system, the book presents burgeoning success stories and illuminates a clear path toward a more sustainable and equitable food future. The New York Times calls it “an important, accessible book on a crucial subject.”

Before starting Fair Food Network, Dr. Hesterman co-led the Integrated Farming Systems and Food and Society Programs for the W.K. Kellogg Foundation for 15 years, during which time the Foundation seeded the local food systems movement with over $200 million. At Kellogg, Dr. Hesterman envisioned and nurtured national and international food system projects and collaborations and organized seminars on sustainable agriculture and community-based food systems on behalf of the Foundation.

Prior to his position at the Kellogg Foundation, he was a fellow at the National Center for Food and Agriculture Policy in Washington, DC and a professor of crop and soil science at Michigan State University in East Lansing from 1984-1995.

Dr. Hesterman earned his bachelor's and master's degrees from the University of California, Davis, in plant science/vegetable crops and agronomy, respectively. He received his doctorate in agronomy and business administration from the University of Minnesota, St. Paul.

He grew up in Berkeley, California and presently lives in Ann Arbor, Michigan with his wife, Lucinda Kurtz.
