= Nick Clausen =

Danish boxer

Nicolaj Charles Sofus Clausen (23 May 1900 – 23 September 1989) was a Danish boxer who competed in the 1920 Summer Olympics. He was born in Copenhagen and died in Frederiksberg. In 1920 he was eliminated in the quarter-finals of the featherweight class after losing his fight to Jack Zivic.
