= Willy Reichenbach =

Swiss boxer

Personal information
- Nationality: Swiss
- Born: 9 January 1896 Geneva, Switzerland

Sport
- Sport: Boxing

Willy Reichenbach was a Swiss boxer. He competed in the men's welterweight event at the 1920 Summer Olympics.
