= Clarence Walker (boxer) =

South African boxer

Personal information
- Born: 13 December 1898 Port Elizabeth, Cape Colony
- Died: 30 April 1957 (aged 58) Roodepoort, South Africa
Medal record
Men's boxing
Representing South Africa
Olympic Games
Gold medal – first place	1920 Antwerp	Bantamweight

Clarence Leonard "Sal" Walker (13 December 1898 – 30 April 1957) was a South African bantamweight professional boxer who competed in the early 1920s. He won the gold medal at the 1920 Summer Olympics, defeating Chris Graham in the final.

== Olympic results ==
- Defeated Alfons Bouwens (Belgium)
- Defeated Edwart Hartman (United States)
- Defeated George McKenzie (Great Britain)
- Defeated Chris Graham (Canada)
