= Mikal Grøvan =

Norwegian politician

Mikal Grøvan (15 February 1899 - 25 April 1956) was a Norwegian politician for the Liberal Party.

He served as a deputy representative to the Norwegian Parliament from Vest-Agder during the terms 1950–1953 and 1954–1957. He died before the end of the second term.
