= Michel Rey-Golliet =

French boxer

Michel Rey-Golliet (21 March 1893 – 18 September 1967) was a French boxer who competed in the 1920 Summer Olympics. In 1920 he was eliminated in the quarter-finals of the middleweight class after losing his fight to the eventual silver medalist Georges Prud'Homme.
