= Per Hagen =

Norwegian politician

Per Hagen (27 August 1899 – 4 October 1983) was a Norwegian politician for the Conservative Party.

He served as a deputy representative to the Norwegian Parliament from Buskerud during the term 1950–1953.
