= Jean-Baptiste Rampignon =

French boxer

Jean-Baptiste Rampignon (15 May 1900 – 13 June 1923) was a French boxer who competed in the 1920 Summer Olympics. In 1920, he was eliminated in the quarter-finals of the flyweight class after losing his fight to the upcoming gold medalist Frankie Genaro.

He died on June 13, 1923, one day after he slipped into a coma following his loss against Andre Gleizes in a bout for the French flyweight championship.
