= Eilert Bøhm =

Norwegian artistic gymnast

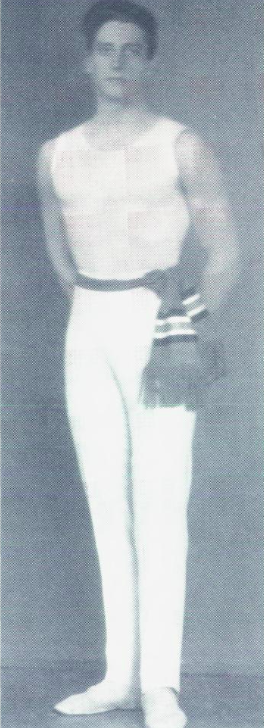
- Bøhm in 1920

Personal information
- Full name: Eilert Steensrud Bøhm
- Born: 17 July 1900 Moss, United Kingdoms of Sweden and Norway
- Died: 1 February 1982 (aged 81) Moss, Norway

Gymnastics career
- Discipline: Men's artistic gymnastics
- Country represented: Norway
- Gym: Chistiania Turnforening
Medal record
Men's artistic gymnastics
Representing Norway
Olympic Games
Silver medal – second place	1920 Antwerp	Team, free system

Eilert Steensrud Bøhm (17 July 1900 – 1 February 1982) was a Norwegian gymnast who competed in the 1920 Summer Olympics. He was part of the Norwegian team, which won the silver medal in the gymnastics men's team, free system event.
