= Olav Marensius Strandås =

Norwegian politician

Olav Marensius Strandås (28 March 1900 - 12 January 1981) was a Norwegian politician for the Labour Party.

He served as a deputy representative to the Norwegian Parliament from Østfold during the term 1950–1953,
