= Edoardo Garzena =

Italian boxer (1900–1982)

Olympic medal record

Men's Boxing
| Bronze medal – third place | 1920 Antwerp | Featherweight |

Edoardo Garzena (4 May 1900 – 11 July 1982) was an Italian featherweight boxer who competed in the 1920s. He was born and died in Turin. Garzena won a bronze medal at the 1920 Summer Olympics, losing to French boxer Jean Gachet in the semi-finals.

== 1920 Olympic results ==
- Round of 32: bye
- Round of 16: defeated Roger Vincken (Belgium)
- Quarterfinal: defeated James Cater (Great Britain)
- Semifinal: lost to Paul Fritsch (France)
- Bronze Medal Bout: defeated Jack Zivic (United States) -- was awarded bronze medal
