= William Hamilton (sport shooter) =

Canadian sports shooter

Personal information
- Born: 10 May 1884 Toronto, Canada
- Died: 3 April 1939 (aged 54)

Sport
- Sport: Sports shooting

William Hamilton (10 May 1884 – 3 April 1939) was a Canadian sports shooter. He competed in two events at the 1920 Summer Olympics.
