= Johan Trandem =

Norwegian shot putter and discus thrower

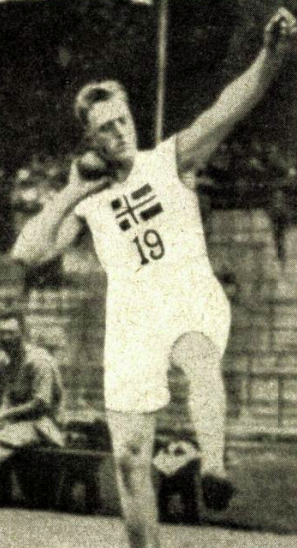
Johan against Sweden on 14 September 1930, throwing 13,56 meters.

Johan Trandem (23 July 1899 – 29 December 1996) was a Norwegian shot putter and discus thrower.

At the 1928 Summer Olympics he finished eighth in the discus final with a throw of 43.97 metres and thirteenth in shot put with 13.40 metres. He became Norwegian champion in discus throw in the years 1922-1924, and in shot put in 1925.

His personal best discus throw was 44.60 metres, achieved in September 1928 in Skotterud. His personal best in shot put was 13.81 metres, achieved in October 1925 in Halden.
