= William Taylor (cyclist) =

Canadian cyclist

Personal information
- Born: October 1899 Gateshead, County Durham, England
- Died: 6 December 1976 (aged 77) Guelph, Ontario, Canada

Cycling career
- Sport: Cycling

William W. Taylor (October 1899 – 6 December 1976) was a Canadian cyclist. He competed in three events at the 1920 Summer Olympics.
