= Roger Brousse =

French boxer (1901–1975)

Roger Brousse (8 June 1901 – 24 September 1975) was a French boxer. He competed in the 1924 Summer Olympics. In 1924, Brousse initially was awarded the victory on points in his quarter-final bout of the middleweight class. However, he was later disqualified for having bitten his opponent, the eventual gold medallist, Harry Mallin.

Roger François Brousse was born on 8 June 1901 in Courtenay. He died on 24 September 1975 in Vétheuil at the age of 74.
