= Thomas Henrik Hammer =

Norwegian politician

Thomas Henrik Hammer (1815–1900) was a Norwegian jurist and politician.

Hailing from Toten, he took the cand.jur. degree in 1839 and moved to Jæren to work. He was elected to the Norwegian Parliament in 1859, representing the constituency of Stavanger Amt.

In 1860 he was appointed district stipendiary magistrate (sorenskriver) of Indre Sogn. He was a deputy representative to Parliament in 1865 and 1866. He later became district stipendiary magistrate of Egersund.
