= Jean Gachet =

French boxer (1894–1968)

Olympic medal record

Men's Boxing
Silver medal – second place	1920 Antwerp	Featherweight

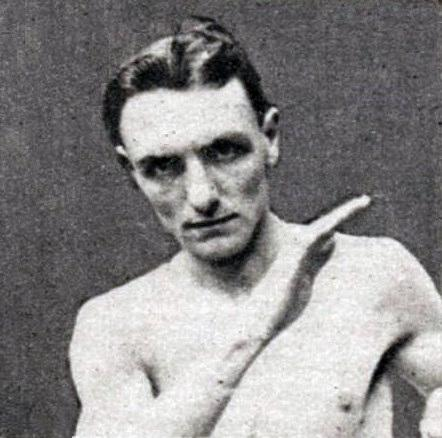
Jean Gachet en 1920

Jean Gachet (2 June 1894 in Saint-Étienne – 4 February 1968) was a French featherweight boxer. He competed in the 1920s. Gachet won a silver medal at the 1920 Summer Olympics, losing to Paul Fritsch in the final.

== Olympic results ==
- 1st round bye
- Defeated Arthur Olsen (Norway)
- Defeated Philippe Bouvy (Belgium)
- Defeated Jack Zivic (United States)
- Lost to Paul Fritsch (France)
