= Ragnvald Mikal Andersen =

Norwegian politician

Ragnvald Mikal Andersen (26 March 1899 – 28 February 1995) was a Norwegian politician for the Labour Party.

He was born in Bergen.

He was elected to the Norwegian Parliament from Bergen in 1958, but was not re-elected. He had previously served as a deputy representative during the term 1954–1957, and later served in the same position from 1961–1965.

On the local level Andersen was a member of Bergen city council from 1954 to 1959.

Andersen spent his entire career as a ship mechanic, and was active in the Norwegian Confederation of Trade Unions.
