= Bertel Flaten =

Norwegian politician

Bertel Flaten (31 January 1900 – 15 January 1963) was a Norwegian politician for the Liberal Party.

He served as a deputy representative to the Norwegian Parliament from Sogn og Fjordane during the terms 1954–1957 and 1958–1961.
