= Finn Nagell =

Finn Nagell OBE (6 August 1899 – 1977) was a Norwegian military officer, Milorg pioneer, economist and businessperson.

== Personal life ==
He was born in Kristiania to Vilhelm Karl Nagell and Solveig Hansen, and married Lollik Eriksen in 1925.

== Career ==
Nagell graduated as a military officer in 1921. From 1939, he headed the Rjukan and Herøya anti-aircraft command, and thus during the Norwegian Campaign. It was the only regular military command in Telemark that survived the first week after the German invasion. Originally numbering 250 men, the forces at Rjukan increased to 1,000 men before their surrender in May 1940.

From 1941 to 1944, he headed the intelligence office of the Ministry of Defence of the Norwegian government-in-exile in London. After the Second World War, he remained in the military.

From 1962, he worked as business executive in the mining industry.

He was made an Officer of the Order of the British Empire and awarded the American Legion of Merit.
