= Dagfinn Zwilgmeyer =

Norwegian priest and psalmist

- Born: 24 December 1900; Sauherad Municipality, Sweden-Norway
- Died: 3 April 1979 (aged 78)
- Occupations: priest and psalmist

Dagfinn Zwilgmeyer (24 December 1900 – 3 April 1979) was a Norwegian priest and psalmist. He was born in Sauherad Municipality in Telemark county, a son of politician Ludvig Daae Zwilgmeyer. He published his first psalm collection in 1933, Regnbuen. Later collections are Solsangen, Norrøne og nye salmer and Fager er liten. During the occupation of Norway by Nazi Germany Zwilgmeyer was appointed as a bishop by Vidkun Quisling, following the protest resignation of the regular bishops of the Church of Norway. He joined the Fascist party Nasjonal Samling, registering weak and futile objections to Quisling's policies. It was reported in 1943 that he resigned from the Nasjonal Samling. He was Mayor of Fana Municipality, later acting Bishop in Bjørgvin, and then Bishop in Hamar.
