= Arthur Olsen (boxer, born 1900) =

Norwegian boxer

Arthur Theodor Olsen (15 December 1900 – 8 December 1951) was a Norwegian boxer who competed in the 1920 Summer Olympics. He died in Bergen. In 1920 he was eliminated in the second round of the featherweight class after losing his fight to the upcoming silver medalist Jean Gachet.
