= Samuel Lagonia =

American boxer

Samuel Joseph Lagonia (April 19, 1898 – November 15, 1968) was an American boxer who competed in the 1920 Summer Olympics. He was born in Westchester, New York and died in Flushing, New York. In 1920, he was eliminated in the quarter-finals of the middleweight class after losing his fight to Harry Mallin, who went on to win the Gold Medal.
