= Jack Zivic =

American boxer (1903–1973)

- Leading with his left

Personal information
- Nationality: American
- Born: John Zivic; June 23, 1903 Pittsburgh, Pennsylvania, U.S.
- Died: May 22, 1973 (aged 69) Wilmington, Delaware, U.S.
- Height: 5 ft 6 in (1.68 m)
- Weight: Lightweight; Welterweight

Boxing career

Boxing record
- Total fights: 72
- Wins: 40
- Win by KO: 12
- Losses: 28
- Draws: 4

John A. "Jack" Zivic (June 23, 1903 – May 22, 1973) was an American boxer who competed in the featherweight class in the 1920 Summer Olympics in Antwerp. He was a serious contender for the world lightweight championship in 1924, but was defeated by reigning junior lightweight champion Jack Bernstein in an elimination tournament. He had solid skills despite scoring only 12 knockouts in 70 professional fights, and was known for his left hook.

== Early life ==
He was born to a family of Croatian heritage, on June 23, 1903 in Pittsburgh, Pennsylvania and was the second oldest of five boys. At 14, Jack quit school to work as an electrician's helper in a Pittsburgh mill for three dollars a day, an attractive sum in that era. His older brother Peter, and younger brothers Fritzie, and Eddie, were also accomplished boxers. Fritzie took the world welterweight championship in 1940. Brother Joe boxed as an amateur, but worked for more of his life as a sports official.

== Amateur and Olympic career ==
Jack was an exceptional amateur, and like his brother Peter, trained with Jack Metz at the Willow Club on 46th Street in Pittsburgh's Lawrenceville section. In 1918, he won the International Amateur Championship as a feather or possibly bantamweight. In an impressive amateur career between 1919–21, he was reputed to have won 45 victories with only three defeats.

In 1920 he finished fourth in the featherweight class of the Antwerp Olympics after losing the bronze medal bout to Edoardo Garzena. At the Olympics, he caught the attention of Spike Webb, a famous U.S. Naval coach, who had him box at an amateur tournament in New York and then encouraged him to turn professional. In one of his last amateur bouts on July 12, 1921 with Artie Martin at the New York Athletic Club, he received a shoulder injury that required surgery and caused him problems throughout his boxing career. It was probably the origin of his powerful left hook.

He re-injured his right shoulder on April 3, 1922 in a ninth round technical knockout against Eddie Crozier at the New York Athletic Club on April 3, 1922.

== Upset victory over Charley White, 1923 ==
Zivic defeated top rated contender Charley White in an upset on June 11, 1923 in a ten round newspaper decision at Motor Square Garden in Pittsburgh, Pennsylvania. Zivic was credited with the first, second, fourth, fifth, seventh, and ninth, with White taking the remaining four rounds, though he had Zivic in distress only in the eighth.

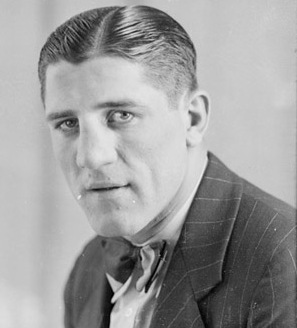
Joe Dundee

He lost to the exceptional future world welterweight champion Joe Dundee on September 12, 1923 in a twelve round points decision in Baltimore. The Baltimore Sun wrote that Dundee had a clear advantage in ten of the twelve rounds, though Zivic performed well in the second and seventh. He lost again to Dundee on October 15, 1926, in a ten round points decision at Madison Square Garden. Dundee scored too often with hard rights to the body and left hooks to the jaw of Zivic. Many of Zivic's points were scored with body punches at close quarters and clinches in the sixth and seventh, though he rallied in the eighth.

Zivic decisively defeated accomplished Jewish boxer Joe Tiplitz in a ten round points decision at Pittsburgh's Motor Square Garden on November 12, 1923. Zivic was charged with four fouls during the bout, including a low blow in the fourth that required a two minute break to allow Zivic to recover. Zivic rocked Tiplitz with blows to the body and head in the second, making his best showing.

== Unsuccessful attempts at the world lightweight title, 1924 ==
In an early round of the world lightweight elimination tournament to find a successor to Benny Leonard, he defeated Detroit southpaw Sid Barbarian at Coney Island's Henderson Bowl in an important twelve round points decision. The Pittsburgh Post gave six rounds to Zivic, with only the third and ninth to Barbarian. In the first two rounds, Zivic gave one of best career performances, landing squarely on the face of his opponent, but in the third, Barbarian scored with lefts, once knocking Zivic to his knees for a no count. The fourth through sixth saw Zivic solving Barbarian's southpaw stance, and Zivic dominated the tenth through twelfth so clearly that he clinched the decision. In the middle of the ninth, Zivic dropped Barbarian for a count of two, before dominating most of the following rounds. In an interview in 1960, Zivic said he believed he had made a decisive tournament win in defeating Barbarian, and indeed the New Castle Herald wrote that the win earned him the right to face Leonard for the title, but in fact several additional rounds would be required to take the world title, and Zivic had the misfortune to face a reigning champion in the next round.

On July 23, 1924, he participated in the next round of the lightweight elimination bout in Brooklyn, but lost decisively in a twelve round decision to Jack Bernstein before a sizable crowd of 5,824. He was unable to penetrate the skilled defense of the former world junior lightweight champion. Bernstein, in his characteristic crouch, would rush into close quarters and then fire short, fast, rights and lefts to the head, keeping Zivic dazed and off balance. In the sixth, blood from a cut eye bled, causing further disadvantage to Zivic.

== Knockout win over Lew Tendler, 1925 ==
In what was likely his most notable win, he knocked out the exceptional lightweight contender Lew Tendler, now fighting as a welterweight, in a fifth round technical knockout at Motor Square Garden in Pittsburgh on January 19, 1925. Tendler was down for the second time in the fifth for a count of three, when the referee called the bout, 2:48 into the round. He had first been sent to the mat for a count of seven from a powerful left hook from Zivic. It was Tendler's only loss by knockout. He would later lose to Tendler on June 8, 1925 in a ten round unanimous decision at Shibe Park in Tendler's native Philadelphia.

He defeated Willie Harmon, a serious contender for the world welterweight championship, on September 21, 1925 at Yankee Stadium in the Bronx. The ticket that day featured Mickey Walker, and a substantial crowd of 40,000 booed the decision in favor of Zivic. Harmon seemed to hold a comfortable lead in the first five rounds, though Zivic pulled ahead in the sixth, seventh, and eighth. In three subsequent meetings with Harmon, he lost a ten round points decision at Motor Square Garden in Pittsburgh in December 1927, drew in a ten round points decision at Madison Square Garden on May 17, 1926, and lost a ten round points decision at Motor Square Garden in Pittsburgh. In their May, 1926 meeting at Madison Square Garden, before a packed house of 20,000, Harmon may have taken the seventh, eighth, and ninth, but the fierce display in the final round, with both boxers looking evenly matched, likely convinced the referee to rule for a draw.

Zivic lost to highly rated welterweight Sargeant Sammy Baker on July 2, 1929 in a brutal ten round points decision at the Meyers Bowl at North Braddock, Pennsylvania. Zivic took a vicious beating at the hands of Baker but remained on his feet throughout the bout. The Pittsburgh Press wrote that after a year away from the professional ring, Zivic had no hitting power, his footwork was wobbly, his speed was lacking and his powerful hook was nowhere to be seen. In a previous meeting on December 7, 1925, Zivic had lost to Baker in a six round disqualification at the Broadway Arena in Brooklyn.

Zivic met fellow Olympian and future world welterweight champion Jackie Fields on June 26, 1928, losing in a seventh round technical knockout at Olympic Auditorium in Los Angeles. Zivic was down for a two count from a terrific right to the jaw in the second, took a beating to the body in the third, and was required to clinch frequently in the third, fourth, and fifth. A right hook and left to the stomach, followed by a rain of blows while Zivic was on the ropes, forced the referee to end the bout in the seventh.

In his last known fight against a well known opponent, he lost to Ruby Goldstein on September 10, 1930, in a third round technical knockout at Brooklyn's Henderson Bowl. Zivic, who was clearly outmatched, swung wildly and clinched frequently. In the third, the referee stopped the bout after Ruby scored a hard right to the jaw that put Zivic down for a nine count.

== Life outside boxing ==
Zivic lost much of his boxing investments in the 1929 stock market crash, but took a job with a local Pittsburgh area Post Office in 1934. Continuing government work from 1937–60, he became an investigator for the State inheritance tax. Between his stint as an investigator, he served in the Coast Guard in WWII. He had a wife, Thelma Mesner Zivic, and a daughter and they resided in Westchester, Pennsylvania during much of their marriage prior to their financial difficulties.

He lived briefly in Tampa, Florida during his early retirement.

Zivic had four brothers, some of whom were well known boxers. These were Joe, International Boxing Hall of Fame member and world champion Fritzie, contender Eddie (who once beat hall of famer Tony Canzoneri) and fellow Olympics boxing contestant Peter Zivic.

According to the Pittsburgh Gazette, he had aspired to become an inventor as a sideline, and had a few of his ideas patented in his retirement. These included a shoeshine glove that dispensed black or tan polish, a towel that had separate sections for body and face, a tool to pry hubcaps, and a plexiglass license plate.

He originally began traveling to Delaware to spend time with his only daughter Jacqueline and her children. He suffered his first heart attack in 1968, and a second in 1969.

After moving there around 1968, he died in Wilmington hospital in Wilmington, Delaware, on May 22, 1973, after a long illness, the result of a heart ailment. He was buried in Wilmington.
