= William Rankin (boxer) =

Canadian boxer

Personal information
- Full name: William Cullen Rankin
- Nationality: Canadian
- Born: 8 August 1898 Kirkintilloch, Scotland
- Died: 17 August 1967 (aged 69) Santa Clara, California, United States

Sport
- Sport: Boxing

William Cullen Rankin (8 August 1898 – 17 August 1967) was a Canadian boxer. He competed in the men's featherweight event at the 1920 Summer Olympics, where he lost to Wim Hesterman of the Netherlands.
