= Boxing at the 1920 Summer Olympics =

Boxing at the Games of the VII Olympiad
- Dates: 21-24 August 1920
- Competitors: 116 from 12 nations

These are the results of the boxing competition at the 1920 Summer Olympics in Antwerp. Medals were awarded in eight weight classes. The competitions were held from 21 to 24 August.

== Participating nations ==
A total of 116 boxers from 12 nations competed at the Antwerp Games:

- Argentina (1)
- Belgium (13)
- Canada (8)
- Denmark (12)
- France (15)
- Great Britain (16)
- Italy (5)
- Netherlands (8)
- Norway (14)
- South Africa (7)
- Switzerland (1)
- United States (16)

== Medal summary ==
Games	Gold	Silver	Bronze
Flyweight (−50.8 kg / 112 lb)	Frankie Genaro; United States	Anders Petersen; Denmark	William Cuthbertson; Great Britain
Bantamweight (−53.5 kg / 118 lb)	Clarence Walker; South Africa	Chris Graham; Canada	George McKenzie; Great Britain
Featherweight (−57.2 kg / 126 lb)	Paul Fritsch; France	Jean Gachet; France	Edoardo Garzena; Italy
Lightweight (−61.2 kg / 135 lb)	Samuel Mosberg; United States	Gotfred Johansen; Denmark	Clarence Newton; Canada
Welterweight (−66.7 kg / 147 lb)	Bert Schneider; Canada	Alexander Ireland; Great Britain	Frederick Colberg; United States
Middleweight (−72.6 kg / 160 lb)	Harry Mallin; Great Britain	Georges Prud'Homme; Canada	Moe Herscovitch; Canada
Light heavyweight (−79.4 kg / 175 lb)	Eddie Eagan; United States	Sverre Sørsdal; Norway	Harold Franks; Great Britain
Heavyweight (over 79.4 kg/175 lb)	Ronald Rawson; Great Britain	Søren Petersen; Denmark	Albert Eluère; France

== Medal table ==
Rank	Nation	Gold	Silver	Bronze	Total
1	United States	3	0	1	4
2	Great Britain	2	1	3	6
3	Canada	1	2	2	5
4	France	1	1	1	3
5	South Africa	1	0	0	1
6	Denmark	0	3	0	3
7	Norway	0	1	0	1
8	Italy	0	0	1	1
Totals (8 entries)		8	8	8	24
