= Rolf Jacobsen (boxer) =

Norwegian boxer

Rolf Jacobsen (25 January 1899 – 15 May 1960) was a Norwegian boxer who competed in the 1920 Summer Olympics. He was born in Kristiania. In 1920 he was eliminated in the second round of the middleweight class after losing his fight to Samuel Lagonia.
