= Joseph Charpentier =

Belgian boxer

Personal information
- Nationality: Belgian
- Born: 25 January 1899 Antwerp, Belgium

Sport
- Sport: Boxing

Joseph Charpentier (born 25 January 1899, date of death unknown) was a Belgian boxer. He competed in the men's flyweight event at the 1920 Summer Olympics.
