= Harry Henning =

Canadian boxer (1903–1986)

Personal information
- Full name: Thomas Harry Henning
- Nationality: Canadian
- Born: 1 June 1903; Greenwich, London, England
- Died: November 1986; Wandsworth, London, England

Sport
- Sport: Boxing

Harry Henning (1 June 1903 – November 1986) was a Canadian boxer. He competed in the men's middleweight event at the 1924 Summer Olympics. Henning was affiliated with Classic AC in Toronto.
