= Joseph Thomas (boxer) =

South African boxer

Personal information
- Nationality: South African

Sport
- Sport: Boxing

Joseph Thomas was a South African boxer. He competed in the men's welterweight event at the 1920 Summer Olympics.
