= Frederick Adams (boxer) =

British boxer

Personal information
- Nationality: British

Sport
- Sport: Boxing

Frederick Thomas Adams was a British boxer. He competed in the 1920 Summer Olympics.
