= Paul Fritsch =

French boxer (1901–1970)

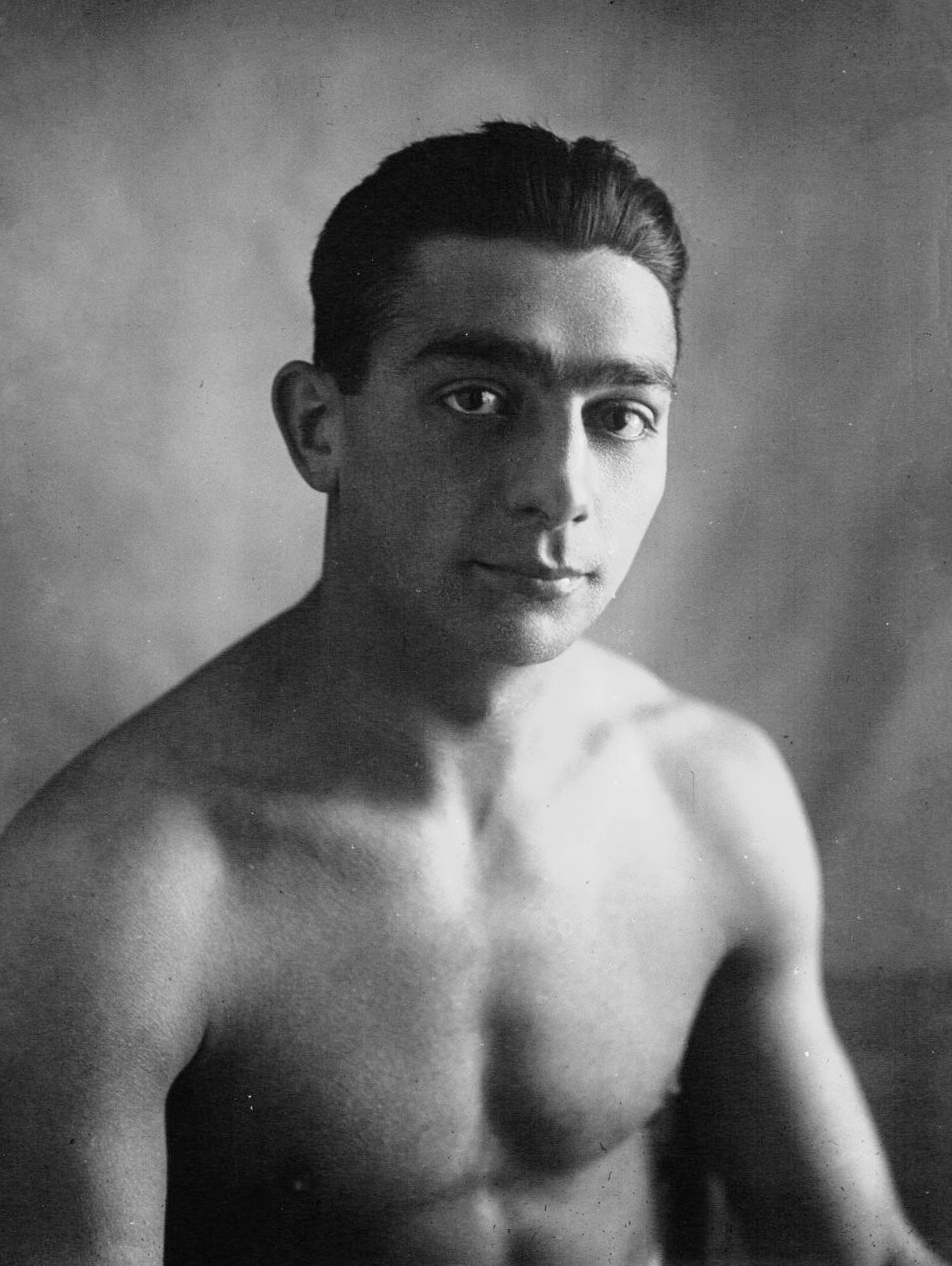
- Paul Fritsch in 1922

Personal information
- Nationality: France
- Born: 25 February 1901 Paris, France
- Died: 22 September 1970 (aged 69) Boulogne-Billancourt, France
- Height: 1.58 m (5 ft 2 in)
- Weight: Lightweight

Boxing career

Boxing record
- Total fights: 106
- Wins: 68
- Win by KO: 32
- Losses: 22
- Draws: 16
Medal record
Representing France
Olympic Games
Gold medal – first place	1920 Antwerp	Featherweight

Paul Fritsch (25 February 1901 – 22 September 1970) was a French featherweight professional boxer who competed in the early 1920s. In 1920 he became the first French boxer to win an Olympic title, defeating teammate Jean Gachet in the final, despite losing to Gachet at the national championships before the Olympics. After more than 300 amateur bouts, Fritsch turned professional in 1921. He fought approximately 100 more bouts, but never won a major title. He retired from boxing in 1929 due to a retinal detachment and became a car salesman.

== 1920 Olympic results ==
Below is the record of Paul Fritsch, a French featherweight boxer who competed at the 1920 Antwerp Olympics:

- Round of 32: bye
- Round of 16: defeated George Etcell (USA)
- Quarterfinal: defeated Paul Erdal (Norway)
- Semifinal: defeated Edoardo Garzena (Italy)
- Final: defeated Jean Gachet (France)

Note: In 1920, a country could have more than one boxer per weight classification
