= William Bradley (boxer) =

South African boxer

Bill Bradley
Personal information
- Nationality: South African

Sport
- Sport: Boxing

William Robert Bradley was a British and South African boxer. He fought as Bill Bradley. He competed in the men's middleweight event at the 1920 Summer Olympics.

Bradley won the 1913 A.B.A. Middleweight Championship of Britain, fighting under the Bermondsey Catholic ABC.
