= Wim Hesterman =

Dutch boxer

Willem "Wim" Hesterman (26 November 1897, in Amsterdam – 2 December 1971, in Amstelveen) was a Dutch boxer who competed in the 1920 Summer Olympics. In 1920 he was eliminated in the second round of the featherweight class after losing his fight to Philippe Bouvy.

He was the younger brother of Jan Hesterman and older brother of Catharina Hesterman.
