= Leslie Black =

Canadian boxer (1900–1974)

Leslie Wauchope Black
Personal information
- Born: 23 January 1900 Paisley, Ontario, Canada
- Died: 10 November 1974 (aged 74)

Sport
- Sport: Boxing

Leslie Wauchope Black sometimes shortened to Les Black (23 January 1900 – 10 November 1974) was a Canadian boxer. He competed in the men's middleweight event at the 1924 Summer Olympics and got 4th place. He later became an orthopedic surgeon and retired at age 70 after suffering a stroke.
