= Henri Ricard =

French boxer

Personal information
- Nationality: French

Sport
- Sport: Boxing

Henri Ricard was a French boxer. He competed in the men's bantamweight event at the 1920 Summer Olympics.

== 1920 Olympic results ==
Below is the record of Henri Ricard, a French bantamweight boxer who competed at the 1920 Antwerp Olympics:

- Round of 16: defeated Hjalmar Nygaard (Norway)
- Quarterfinal: lost to Chris Graham (Canada)
