= Fred Kolberg =

American boxer

Medal record

Men's boxing

Representing the United States

Olympic Games
Bronze medal – third place	1920 Antwerp	Welterweight

Frederick William Kolberg (November 13, 1900 – March 21, 1965) was an American welterweight boxer who competed in the early 1920s. He won a bronze medal in Boxing at the 1920 Summer Olympics, losing against Canadian boxer Bert Schneider in the semi-final.
