= Henri Hébrans =

Belgian boxer

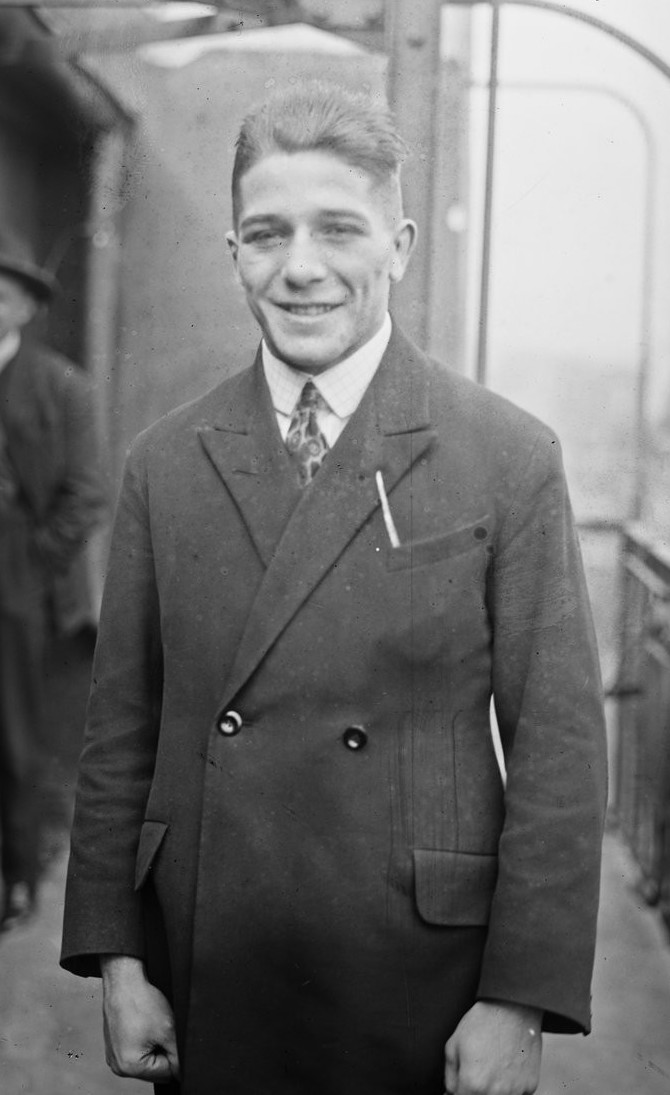

Personal information
- Nationality: Belgian
- Born: 10 February 1904 Liège, Belgium
- Died: 5 June 1998 (aged 94)

Sport
- Sport: Boxing

Henri Hébrans (10 February 1904 – 5 June 1998) was a Belgian boxer. He competed in the men's bantamweight event at the 1920 Summer Olympics.
