= Hjalmar Strømme =

Norwegian boxer

Hjalmar Strømme (26 September 1900 – 15 December 1925) was a Norwegian boxer who competed in the 1920 Summer Olympics. In 1920 he finished fourth in the middleweight class after losing the bronze medal bout to Moe Herscovitch.
