= Anders Petersen (boxer) =

Danish boxer (1899–1966)

Olympic medal record

Men's Boxing
Silver medal – second place	1920 Antwerp	Flyweight

Anders Otto Petersen (16 December 1899 – 28 April 1966) was a Danish flyweight professional boxer who competed in the 1920s. Known as "Vidunderbarnet (Wonder kid)", he won a silver medal in Boxing at the 1920 Summer Olympics, losing to American Frankie Genaro in the final. He was the first Danish boxer to win an Olympic medal.

He had the nickname Vidunderbarnet (eng: the wonderkid), as he won the Danish Championship in 1917 at the age of only 15. He won the championship again in 1919 and 1920

He represented the clubs IK99 and Frederiksberg IF as an amateur. In 1921, he turned professional and represented Idrætshuset.

== 1920 Olympic results ==
Below are the results of Anders Pedersen, a Danish flyweight boxer, who competed at the 1920 Olympics in Antwerp:

- Round of 16: defeated Nelis van Dijk (Netherlands)
- Quarterfinal: defeated Peter Zivic (United States)
- Semifinal: defeated William Cuthbertson (Great Britain)
- Final: lost to Frankie Genaro (United States) -- was awarded silver medal
