= Harry Mallin =

English boxer

- Mallin in the early 1920s

Personal information
- Full name: Henry William Mallin
- Nationality: English
- Born: 1 June 1892 Hackney Wick, London, England
- Died: 8 November 1969 (aged 77) Lewisham, England
- Height: 5 ft 10.5 in (180 cm)

Sport
- Sport: Boxing
- Weight class: Middleweight
- Club: Eton Manor Boys and Old Boys Club, Hackney Wick. Metropolitan Police Amateur Boxing Club
Medal record
Men's Boxing
Representing Great Britain
Olympic Games
Gold medal – first place	1920 Antwerp	Middleweight
Gold medal – first place	1924 Paris	Middleweight

Henry William Mallin (1 June 1892 – 8 November 1969) was an English middleweight amateur boxer. He came originally from Hackney Wick; his younger brother was the Olympic boxer Fred Mallin. He lived in Dartmouth Park, North London, and was a police officer with the Metropolitan Police.

== Boxing career ==
Mallin was Amateur Boxing Association British middleweight champion five years in a row from 1919 to 1923. He was also the world champion in the middleweight class between 1920 and 1928. He never lost an amateur bout and never turned professional.

In the 1920 Summer Olympics, he won a gold medal in the middleweight division, defeating Canadian boxer Georges Prud'Homme in the final. In 1924, he went on to win another gold in the same weight class. In that year, he met Roger Brousse of France in the quarter-finals, and after the decision came down 2–1 in favour of Brousse, Mallin showed the referee fresh teeth marks on his chest, which, upon further examination, proved that Mallin had definitely been bitten by his French opponent. Brousse was disqualified, clearing the way for Mallin to win his second gold medal. After the incident versus Brousse, Mallin was referred to by one reporter as "the unroasted human beef of Old England".

Mallin was the first to successfully defend an Olympic title in two consecutive games, and still remains the only male British boxer to do so until Nicola Adams repeated the feat in 2016. He retired undefeated after over 300 bouts.

Subsequently, he managed the British Olympic boxing teams at the 1936 and 1952 Summer Olympics.

In 1937, he achieved the distinction of being the first British television sports commentator, when he gave commentary on two boxing matches that were broadcast by the BBC from Alexandra Palace.

== Personal life ==
Mallin lived in police accommodation at Peel House, 105 Regency Street, Pimlico, City of Westminster, where, in 2018, a blue plaque was erected by English Heritage.

Mallin died at a nursing home in Lewisham in November 1969.
