= Scipione Del Giudice =

Italian rower

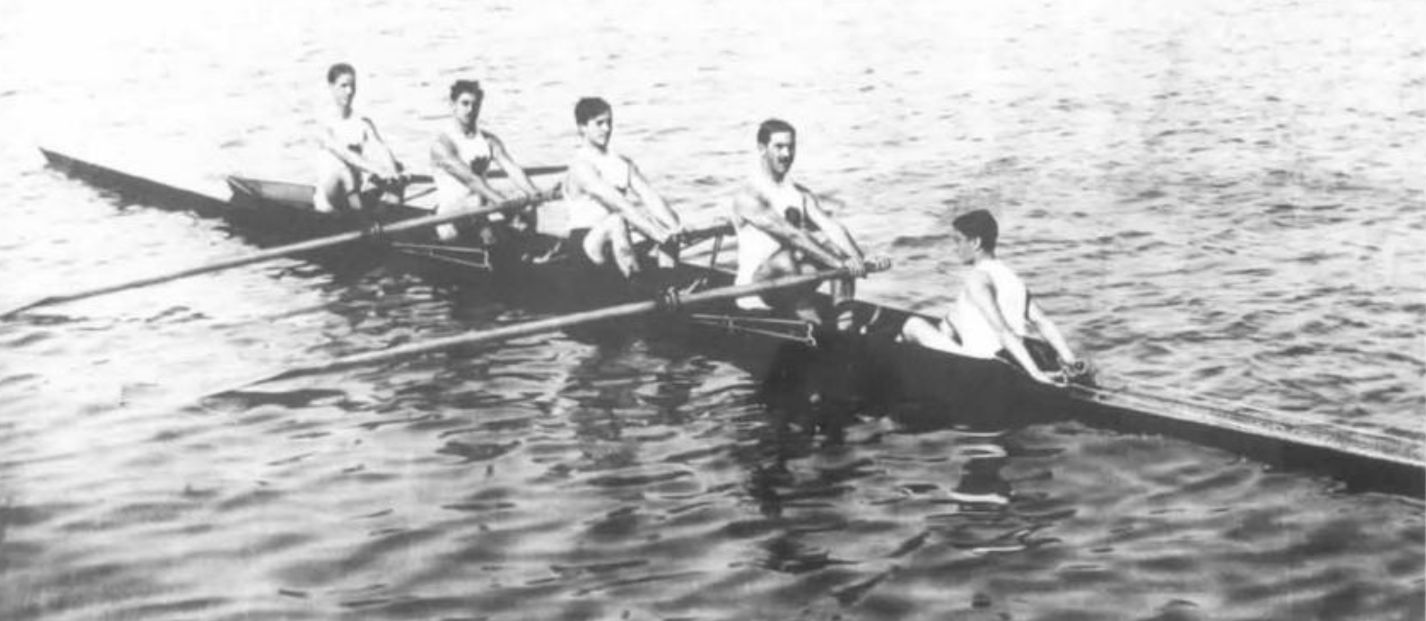
- Scipione Del Giudice in the bow seat (i.e. left), with his brother Brenno in front of him

Personal information
- Born: 23 November 1888 Venice, Italy
- Died: 1950 (aged 61–62)
- Relatives: Brenno Del Giudice (twin brother)

Sport
- Sport: Rowing
- Club: Querini, Venice
Medal record
Men's rowing
Representing Italy
European Rowing Championships
Silver medal – second place	1905 Ghent	Coxed four
Gold medal – first place	1906 Pallanza	Coxed pair
Gold medal – first place	1908 Lucerne	Coxed four
Silver medal – second place	1908 Lucerne	Coxed pair
Gold medal – first place	1909 Paris	Coxed pair
Gold medal – first place	1909 Paris	Coxed four
Silver medal – second place	1909 Paris	Eight
Gold medal – first place	1910 Ostend	Coxed four
Silver medal – second place	1911 Como	Coxed four
Gold medal – first place	1911 Como	Eight

Scipione Del Giudice (23 November 1888 – 1950) was an Italian rower. He won several European Rowing Championships and was set to go to the 1912 Summer Olympics when his team was banned from competitions for a year.

== Family ==
Del Giudice was born on 23 November 1888 in Venice; the rower and architect Brenno Del Giudice was his twin brother. Their parents were Vincenzo and Giuditta Del Giudice (née Zuanelli).

== Rowing career ==
Like some of his brothers, he became a rower for the Venetian rowing club Francesco Querini named for the polar explorer who died in 1900. Del Giudice won the 1904 Venetian Championships in a coxed four when he was still just 15 years old. Others in that team included Ercole Olgeni and Emilio Fontanella. The same team became Italian champion at the 1905 regatta in Como. That success qualified them for the 1905 European Rowing Championships in Ghent where they won silver, beaten by the team from Belgium.

In the 1906 season, Del Giudice rowed in a coxed pair with Olgeni and coxswain Giuseppe Mion. They became Italian champions and then beat the famous Belgian pair of Guillaume Visser and Urbain Molmans to take the 1906 European title in Pallanza.

In 1908, Del Giudice became Italian champion in both the coxed pair (again with Olgeni and cox Mion) and the coxed four. At the 1908 European Championships, he won silver in the coxed pair (this time beaten by the Belgians Visser and Molmans) but the coxed four became European champion.

In 1909, Del Giudice teamed up with Luigi Ermellini in the coxed pair; G. Mion remained as coxswain. Del Giudice became Italian champion in the coxed pair, the coxed four, and the eight. The 1909 European Rowing Championships were held in Paris and Del Giudice won gold in the coxed pair and the coxed four. When the men's eight started, most of the rowers had already been part of the earlier boats that day and the team was beaten by the French who, apart from Gaston Delaplane, rowed their first competition that day; the Italians had to settle for silver.

In 1910, Del Giudice became Italian champion in both the coxed pair and the coxed four. At the 1910 European Rowing Championships in Ostend, he won gold with the coxed four.

At the 1911 European Rowing Championships held on Lake Como, the judges have difficulty in deciding on the winner of the coxed four and eventually award gold medal to the Swiss team, with the Italian team including Del Giudice getting silver. With the eight, he won gold at those championships.

In 1912, the Italian selection in the men's eight was decided between the two Venetian clubs – Bucintoro and Querini. There was a collision and a scuffle broke out between the rowers. Both clubs were banned from competitions for one year by the Italian Rowing Federation and Italy's Olympic appearance in the eight was cancelled.

After WWI, Del Giudice competed at the 1921 European Rowing Championships in Amsterdam alongside his younger brother Curzio Del Giudice in the coxed pair but they finished outside the medals. Scipione Del Giudice then retired from competitive rowing and trained a junior eight at his club. He was later a rowing coach in Greece. Del Giudice died in 1950.
