= Italy at the 1906 Intercalated Games =

Italy at the Olympics

- IOC code: ITA
- NOC: Italian National Olympic Committee

in Athens
- Competitors: 76 in 9 sports
- Medals Ranked 5th: Gold 7 Silver 6 Bronze 3 Total 16

Summer appearances
- 1896; 1900; 1904; 1908; 1912; 1920; 1924; 1928; 1932; 1936; 1948; 1952; 1956; 1960; 1964; 1968; 1972; 1976; 1980; 1984; 1988; 1992; 1996; 2000; 2004; 2008; 2012; 2016; 2020; 2024

Winter appearances
- 1924; 1928; 1932; 1936; 1948; 1952; 1956; 1960; 1964; 1968; 1972; 1976; 1980; 1984; 1988; 1992; 1994; 1998; 2002; 2006; 2010; 2014; 2018; 2022; 2026

Italy competed at the 1906 Intercalated Games in Athens, Greece. 76 athletes, all men, competed in 37 events in 9 sports.

== Athletics ==
Track

Athlete	Events	Heat		Semifinals		Final	
Athlete	Events	Result	Rank	Result	Rank	Result	Rank
Gaspare Torretta	100 metres	Unknown	2 Q	Unknown	5	did not advance	
Pericle Pagliani	1500 metres	Unknown	Unknown	n/a		did not advance	
Pericle Pagliani	5 mile	n/a				Unknown	5
Dorando Pietri	Marathon	n/a				did not finish	

Field

Athlete	Events	Final	
Athlete	Events	Result	Rank
Gaspare Torretta	Long jump	5.650	17
Emilio Brambilla	Standing long jump	2.725	16
Alberto Masprone	Discus	Unknown	Unknown
Erminio Lucchi	Discus Greek style	Unknown	Unknown
Emilio Brambilla	Pentathlon (Ancient)	48	19

== Cycling ==
Athlete	Events	Heat		Semifinals		Final	
Athlete	Events	Result	Rank	Result	Rank	Result	Rank
Giacinto Fidani	Individual road race	n/a				did not finish	
Francesco Verri	Sprint	n/a				Unknown	1st place, gold medalist(s)
Federico Della Ferrera	Sprint	n/a				Unknown	Unknown
Francesco Verri	333 metres time trial	n/a				22 4/5	1st place, gold medalist(s)
Federico Della Ferrera	333 metres time trial	n/a				23 4/5	6
Francesco Verri	5000 metres	3:34 3/5	1 Q	8:20 2/5	1 Q	7:28 3/5	1st place, gold medalist(s)
Federico Della Ferrera	5000 metres	Unknown	2	did not advance			

== Diving ==
Athlete	Event	Points	Rank
Luigi Capra	10 m platform	did not finish	
Carlo Bonfanti	10 m platform	did not finish	

== Fencing ==
Athlete	Events	Heat Group	Semifinal Group	Final Group
Athlete	Events	Rank	Rank	Rank
Federico Cesarano	Individual Foil	1 Q	3 Q	did not finish
Federico Cesarano	Individual Sabre	1 Q	3 Q	3rd place, bronze medalist(s)
Federico Cesarano	Individual Sabre three hits	4 Q	n/a	Unknown
Carlo Gandini	Individual Épée Masters	n/a		2nd place, silver medalist(s)

== Gymnastics ==
Athlete	Events	Final	
Athlete	Events	Result	Rank
Alberto Braglia	Individual All-Around	115	2nd place, silver medalist(s)
Vitaliano Masotti	Individual All-Around	111	5
Mario Gubiani	Individual All-Around	110	6
Alberto Braglia	Individual All-Around (5 events)	95	2nd place, silver medalist(s)
Vitaliano Masotti	Individual All-Around (5 events)	92	5
Mario Gubiani	Individual All-Around (5 events)	90	7
Federico Bertinotti; Ciro Civinini; Raffaello Giannoni; Azeglio Innocenti; Filiberto Innocenti; Manrico Masetti; Vitaliano Masotti; Quintilio Mazzoncini; Spartaco Nerozzi	All-round Team	16.71	3rd place, bronze medalist(s)
Dante Aloisi; Enrico Brignoli; Pierino Caccialupi; Guido Colavini; Romeo Giannotti; Mario Gubiani; Venceslao Rossi; Romolo Tuzzi; Amadeo Zinzi	All-round Team	16.60	4

== Rowing ==
Athlete	Events	Final	
Athlete	Events	Result	Rank
Enrico Bruna; Giorgio Cesana; Emilio Fontanella	Coxed pairs (1 km)	4:23.0	1st place, gold medalist(s)
Emilio Cesarana; Francesco Civera; Luigi Diana	Coxed pairs (1 km)	4:30.0	2nd place, silver medalist(s)
Enrico Bruna; Giorgio Cesana; Emilio Fontanella	Coxed pairs (1 mile)	7:32.4	1st place, gold medalist(s)
Enrico Bruna; Giorgio Cesana; Emilio Fontanella; Giuseppe Poli; Riccardo Zardinoni	Coxed fours	8:13.0	1st place, gold medalist(s)
Giuseppe Russo; P. Toio; R. Taormina; G. Tarantino; E. Bellotti; Angelo Fornaciari; Giovanni Battista Tanio	6 man Naval Rowing Boats	10:45.0	1st place, gold medalist(s)
G. Cingottu; F. Pieraccini; G. Pizzo; Augusto Graffigna; L. Frediani; Alberto Ruggia; F. Mennella; S. Messina; Antonio Mautrere; Ezio Germignani; Angelo Sartini; Sebastiano Randazzo; Angelo Buoni; Alphonso Nordio; P. Oddone; G. Zannino; E. Rossi	17 man Naval Rowing Boats	Unknown	3rd place, bronze medalist(s)

== Shooting ==
Athlete	Event	Target Hits	Points	Rank
Cesare Liverziani	Free pistol, 25 metres	30	238	6
Cesare Liverziani	Free pistol, 50 metres	29	199	8
Cesare Liverziani	Gras Model Revolver, 20 metres	25	133	24
Cesare Liverziani	Military Revolver, 20 metres	30	231	9
Cesare Liverziani	Dueling Pistol Au Visé, 20 metres	30	233	2nd place, silver medalist(s)
Cesare Liverziani	Dueling Pistol Au Commandement, 25 metres	did not finish		
L. Vignola	Rifle Kneeling or Standing, 300 metres	25	151	29
R. Pastorino	Rifle Kneeling or Standing, 300 metres	24	130	31
Caro	Rifle Kneeling or Standing, 300 metres	23	110	36
Renno	Rifle Kneeling or Standing, 300 metres	26	109	37
G. Bortolato	Rifle Kneeling or Standing, 300 metres	19	108	39
J. Marucci	Rifle Kneeling or Standing, 300 metres	23	106	40
Emilio Mainoldi	Rifle Kneeling or Standing, 300 metres	20	86	42
Franco Micheli	Rifle Kneeling or Standing, 300 metres	did not finish		
L. De Floriani	Rifle Kneeling or Standing, 300 metres	did not finish		

== Swimming ==
Athlete	Events	Heat		Final	
Athlete	Events	Result	Rank	Result	Rank
Mario Albertini	100 metres freestyle	Unknown	Unknown	did not advance	
Mario Albertini	One mile freestyle	n/a		did not finish	

== Weightlifting ==
Athlete	Event	Weight	Rank
Tullio Camillotti	One hand lift	73.75	2nd place, silver medalist(s)
Tullio Camillotti	Two hand lift	108.5	7
