= Polydore Veirman =

Belgian rower

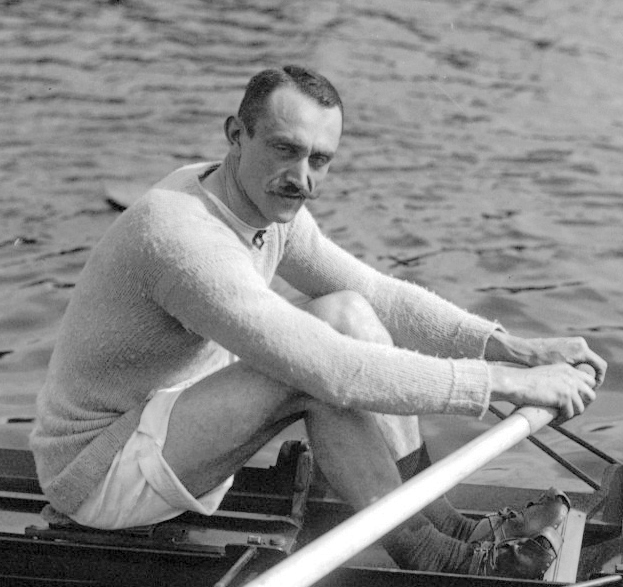
- Polydore Veirman in 1913

Personal information
- Born: Polydore Jules Léon Veirman; 23 February 1881 Ghent, Belgium
- Died: 25 September 1951 (aged 70)
- Weight: 77 kg (170 lb)

Sport
- Sport: Rowing
- Club: KRCG, Gent
Medal record
Men's rowing
Representing Belgium
Olympic Games
| Silver medal – second place | 1908 London | Eight |
| Silver medal – second place | 1912 Stockholm | Single sculls |
European Rowing Championships
| Gold medal – first place | 1901 Zürich | Eight |
| Gold medal – first place | 1907 Strasbourg | Eight |
| Gold medal – first place | 1908 Lucerne | Eight |
| Silver medal – second place | 1908 Lucerne | Coxed four |
| Silver medal – second place | 1909 Paris | Coxed four |
| Silver medal – second place | 1911 Como | Single sculls |
| Gold medal – first place | 1912 Geneva | Single sculls |

Polydore Jules Léon Veirman (23 February 1881 – 25 September 1951) was a Belgian rower who won two Olympic silver medals: in 1908 in the eight, and in 1912 in the single scull. Between 1901 and 1912 Veirman won four gold and three silver medals in various events at European championships. He was assured another medal at the 1913 European Rowing Championships as of the four single scull finalists, Giuseppe Sinigaglia and Anatol Peresselenzeff were disqualified. Competing against only one other rower, Veirman capsized, and Friedrich Graf was the only one to reach the finish line.
