= 1905 European Rowing Championships =

- Venue: Ghent–Terneuzen Canal
- Location: Ghent, Belgium
- Dates: 27 August 1905

The 1905 European Rowing Championships were rowing championships held on 27 August on the Ghent–Terneuzen Canal in the Belgian city of Ghent.

== Medal summary ==
Event	Gold		Silver		Bronze	
Event	Country & rowers	Time	Country & rowers	Time	Country & rowers	Time
M1x	Alsace-Lorraine; Henri Barbenés		France; Gaston Delaplane		(Note: The source does not specify whether there were only two competitors or whether the bronze medal winner is missing from the results list)	
M2x	Belgium; Theodore Conrades; Xavier Crombet		Italy; Luigi Gerli; Emilio Sacchini		France; Pichard; Caudron	
M2+	Belgium; Guillaume Visser; Urbain Molmans; Rodolphe Colpaert (cox)		France; Beurrier; Tirmont		Italy; Archimede de Gregori; Guido de Cupis	
M4+	Belgium; Guillaume Visser; Urbain Molmans; Julien Lauwers; Ernest Tralbaut; Rodolphe Colpaert (cox)		Italy; Ercole Olgeni; Scipione Del Giudice; Emilio Fontanella; Antonio Finotti; Corrado Benedettelli (cox)		France (Note: The source does not list the names of the team members.)	
M8+	France; Coleman; Freichon; Huet; Peron; Vincent; Langevin; Boulanger; Maeckercel		Belgium; Guillaume Visser; Urbain Molmans; Julien Lauwers; Ernest Tralbaut; Albert Heye; Hector Deprume; Polydor de Geyter; Rodolphe Meyvaert; Rodolphe Colpaert (cox)		Italy; Enrico Capelli; Antonio Maganza; Angelo Buffoni; Luigi Gerli; Agostino Urani; Costante Brambilla; Erminio Dones; Mario Rossi	
