= Šourek =

Šourek (feminine Šourková) is a Czech surname meaning scrotum. Notable people include:

- Antonín Václav Šourek (1857–1926), Czech mathematician
- František Šourek-Tuček, Czech fencer
- Jan Šourek, Czech rower
- Jaroslav Šourek (athlete), Czech athlete
- Ondřej Šourek, Czech footballer
