= Brenno Del Giudice =

Italian architect and rower

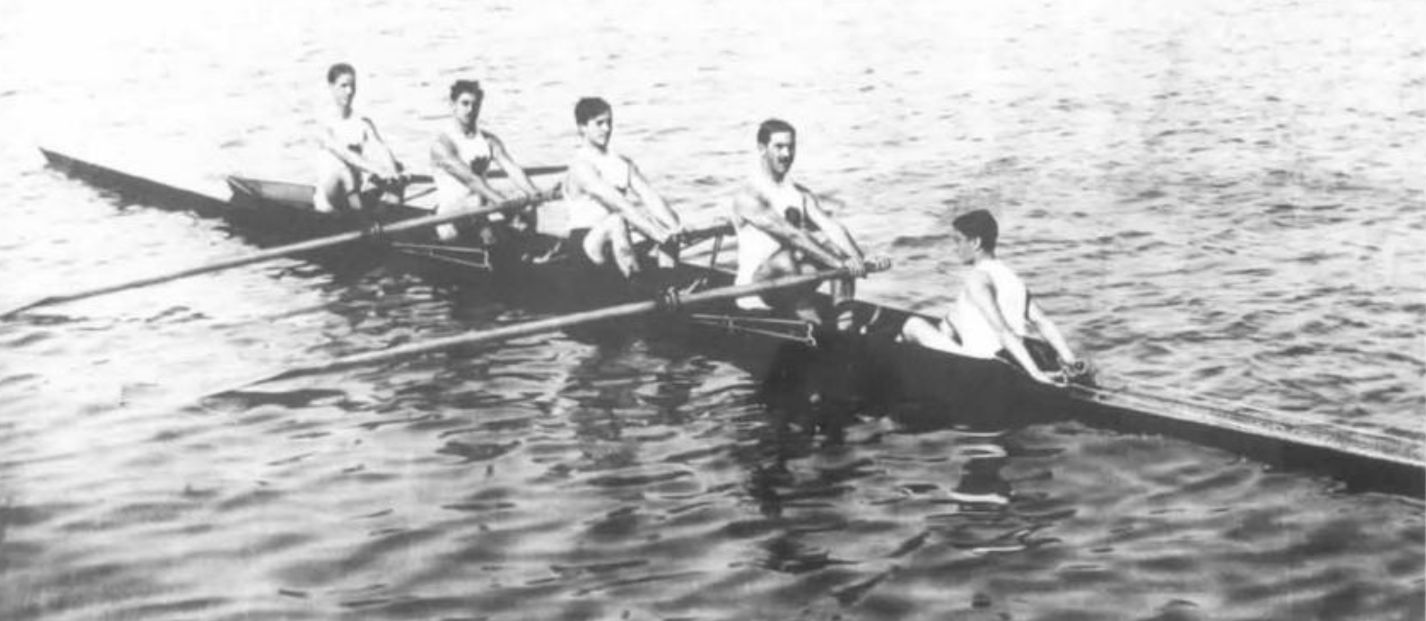
- Brenno Del Giudice in front of his brother Scipione Del Giudice in the bow seat (i.e. left)

Personal information
- Born: 23 November 1888 Venice, Italy
- Died: 6 December 1957 (aged 69) Venice, Italy
- Education: Accademia di Belle Arti di Venezia
- Relatives: Scipione Del Giudice (twin brother)

Sport
- Sport: Rowing
- Club: Querini, Venice
Medal record
Men's rowing
Representing Italy
European Rowing Championships
Gold medal – first place	1908 Lucerne	Coxed four
Gold medal – first place	1909 Paris	Coxed four
Silver medal – second place	1909 Paris	Eight
Gold medal – first place	1910 Ostend	Coxed four
Silver medal – second place	1911 Como	Coxed four
Gold medal – first place	1911 Como	Eight

Brenno Del Giudice (23 November 1888 – 6 December 1957) was an Italian rower who became a prominent architect.

== Family ==
Del Giudice was born on 23 November 1888 in Venice; the rower Scipione Del Giudice was his twin brother. Their parents were Vincenzo and Giuditta Del Giudice (née Zuanelli).

== Rowing career ==
Like some of his brothers, he became a rower for the Venetian rowing club Francesco Querini named for the polar explorer who died in 1900. In 1908, Del Giudice became Italian champion in the coxed four alongside his twin brother; his brother had first won an Italian championship three years earlier. At the 1908 European Championships, the brothers became European champions in the coxed four.

In 1909, the twin brothers became Italian champions in coxed four and the eight; that year their younger brother Curzio (1894–1950) was rowing with them in the eight. The 1909 European Rowing Championships were held in Paris and the twins won gold in the coxed four. When the men's eight started, most of the rowers had already been part of the earlier boats that day and the team was beaten by the French who, apart from Gaston Delaplane, rowed their first competition that day; the Italians including the three Del Giudice brothers had to settle for silver.

In 1910, the twin brothers became Italian champion in the coxed four. At the 1910 European Rowing Championships in Ostend, they won gold with the coxed four.

At the 1911 European Rowing Championships held on Lake Como, the judges had difficulty in deciding on the winner of the coxed four and eventually awarded the gold medal to the Swiss team, with the Italian team including the Del Giudice twins getting silver. With the eight, they won gold at those championships.

In 1912, the Italian selection in the men's eight was decided between the two Venetian clubs – Bucintoro and Querini. There was a collision and a scuffle broke out between the rowers. Both clubs were banned from competitions for one year by the Italian Rowing Federation and Italy's Olympic appearance in the eight was cancelled.

== Architectural career ==
Del Giudice studied at the Accademia di Belle Arti di Venezia (Academy of Fine Arts, Venice) from 1901 until he graduated in 1908. He worked for a few years for the Venetian architect Giuseppe Torres. In 1925, Del Giudice designed the ossuary / monument to the fallen of Vidor. In 1929, the Chiesa di Cristo Re (Church of Christ the King) was built to his design on Sant'Erasmo.

Del Giudice designed the marketing poster for the 15th international art exhibition at the Venice Biennale (1926) and designed the entrance pavilions which have since been demolished. In 1932 the Marathan Tower was built to his design at the Stadio Olimpico Grande Torino.

In 1932, he won the competition for La Spezia Cathedral following La Spezia becoming an episcopal seat in 1927. It was a major commission and he worked on it until 1950 but his designs were never implemented. Instead, in 1956 a new architectural competition was won by Adalberto Libera.

Del Giudice died in Venice on 6 December 1957.

== Gallery ==
Works by Brenno Del Giudice
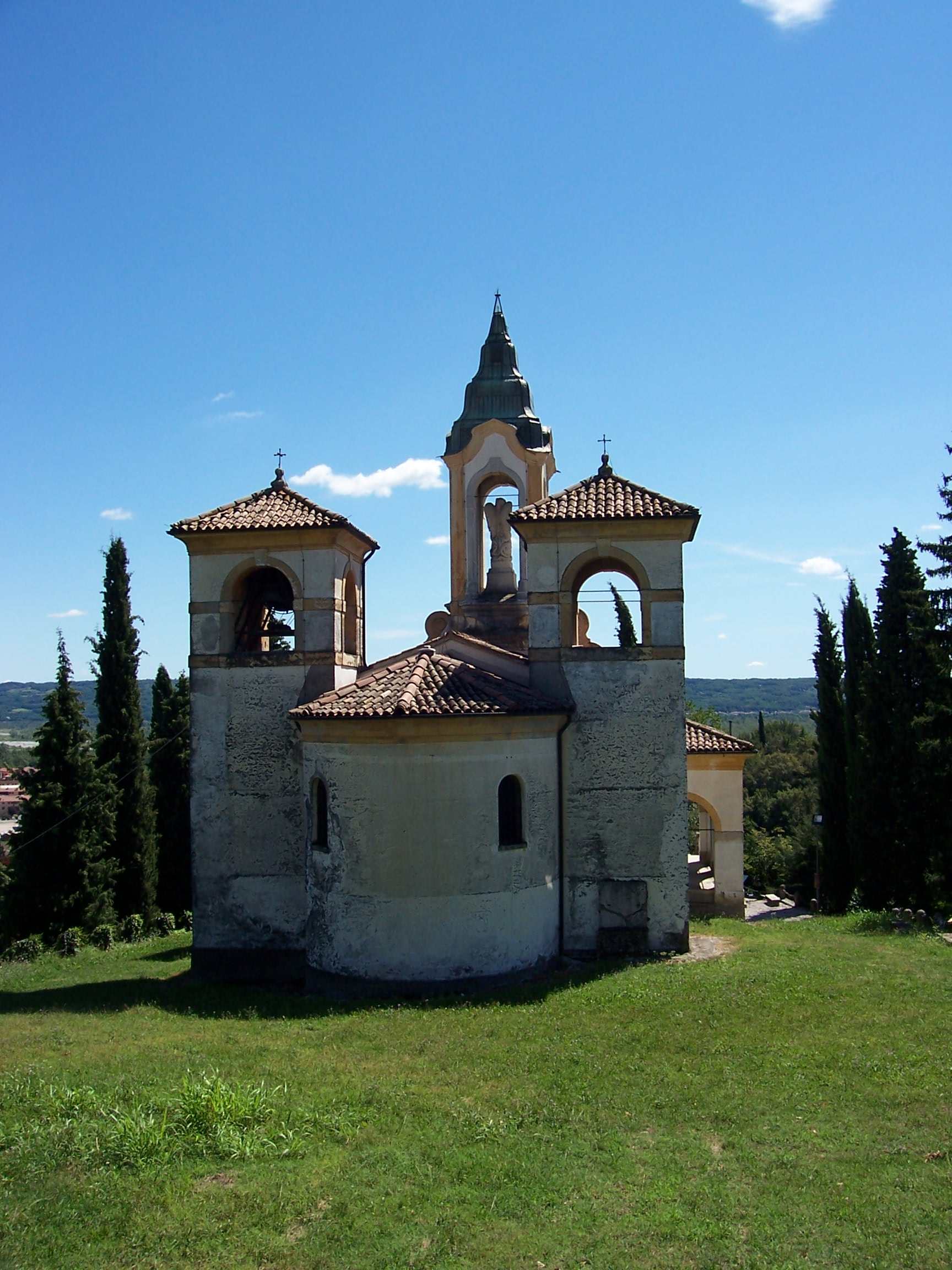
Vidor ossuary / monument (1925)

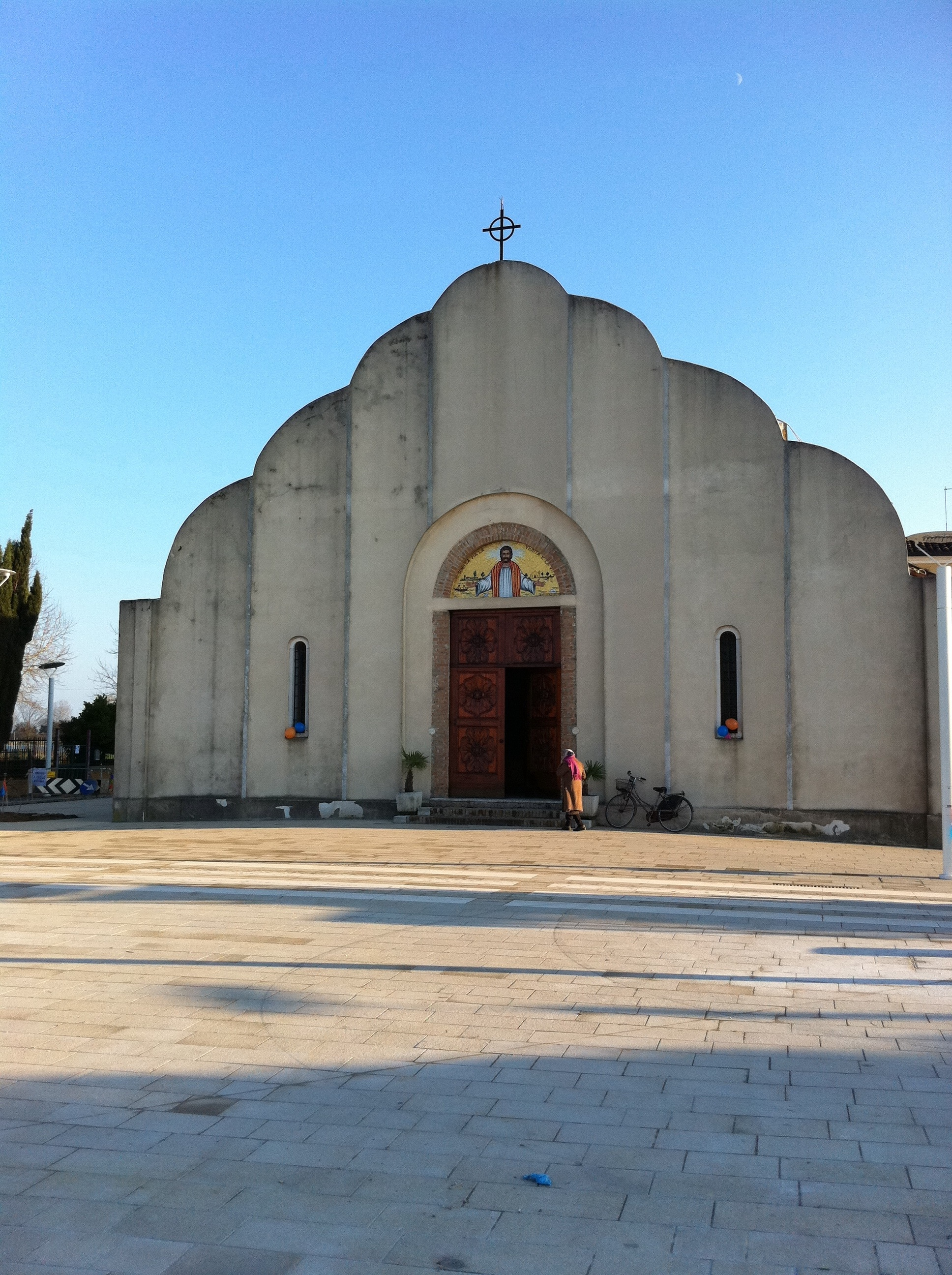
Chiesa di Cristo Re on Sant'Erasmo (1929)

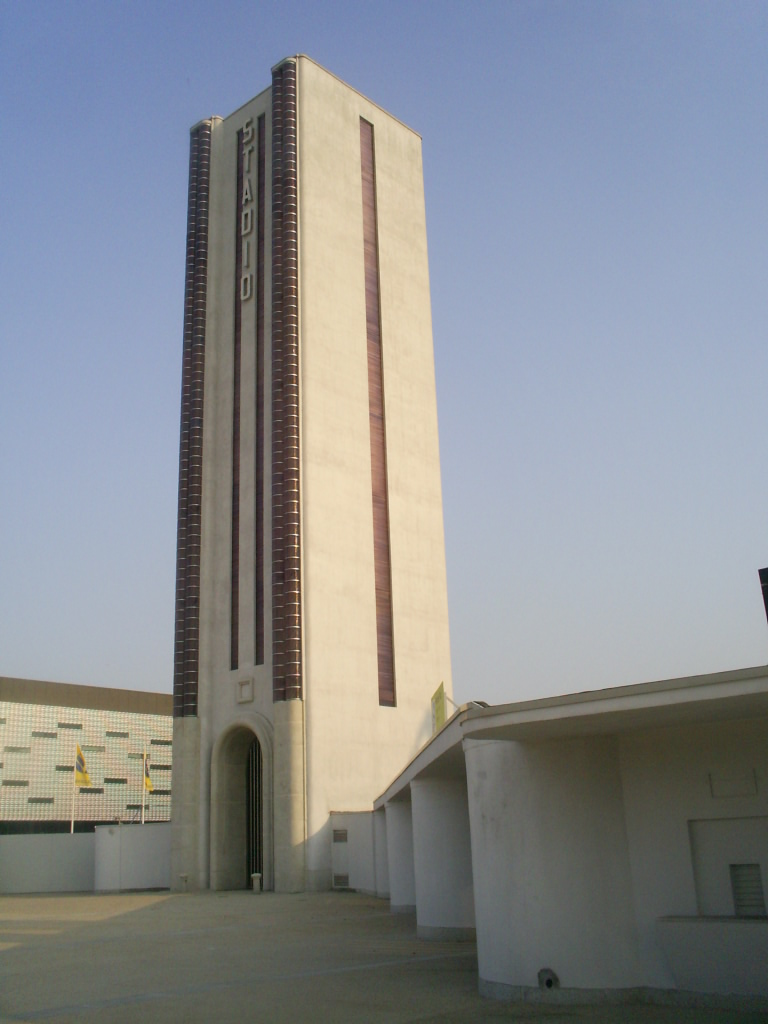
Marathan Tower in Turin (1932)

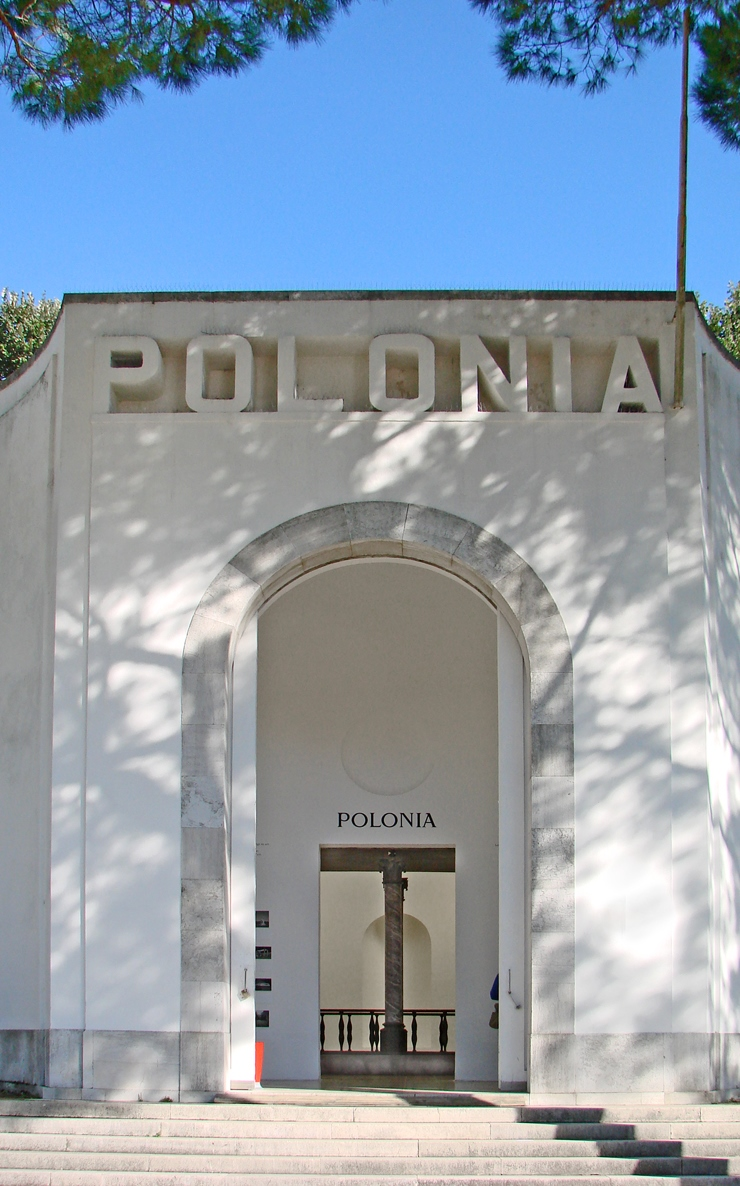
Polish pavilion at the Venice Biennale (1938)
