= Alfred Heinrich =

Alfred Heinrich may refer to:

- Alfred Heinrich (ice hockey)
- Alfred Heinrich (rower)
