= 1910 European Rowing Championships =

- Location: Ostend, Belgium
- Dates: 15 August 1910

The 1910 European Rowing Championships were rowing championships held in the Belgian city of Ostend. The competition, held on 15 August, was for men only and they competed in five boat classes (M1x, M2x, M2+, M4+, M8+).

== Medal summary ==
There is uncertainty about the results shown in the table below. The Italian rowing historian Maurizio Ustolin writes that Venetian rowers from Querini Venezia and Bucintoro Venezia were medallists in all five boat classes. According to Ustolin, Querini won gold in the coxed four (as shown below) and silver in the coxed pair (missing from the table below), with Bucintoro winning silver in the three remaining boat classes (the results show a bronze medal for the Italian single sculler instead). Rowing scholar Peter Mallory then repeated Ustolin's claims in a book chapter on early Italian rowing.

| Event | Gold | | Silver | | Bronze | |
|---|---|---|---|---|---|---|
| Event | Country & rowers | Time | Country & rowers | Time | Country & rowers | Time |
| M1x | France; Gaston Delaplane | | Switzerland; Moritz Stöckly | | Italy; Enrico Bruna | |
| M2x | France; Gaston Delaplane; Francois Rocchesani | | Italy; Enrico Bruna; Ercole Olgeni | | (Note: The source does not list further medallists.) | |
| M2+ | Belgium; Guillaume Visser; Urbain Molmans | | France; Mégrat; Profit | | (Note: The source does not list further medallists.) | |
| M4+ | Italy; Scipione Del Giudice; Luigi Ermellini; Mario Tres; Brenno Del Giudice; Giuseppe Mion (cox) | | Belgium; Guillaume Visser; Urbain Molmans; Gustave Wauters; Oscar Van Den Bossche | | France (Note: The source does not list the names of the team members.) | |
| M8+ | Belgium; Guillaume Visser; Urbain Molmans; Gustave Wauters; Georges Willems; Georges Van Den Bossche; Célestin Van den Noordgate; Edmond Vanwaes; Oscar Van Den Bossche | | Italy; Ercole Olgeni; Antonio Fontanella; Arturo Piazza; Enrico Bruna; Giovanni Scatturin; Agostino Wulten; Edoardo Signoretto; Aldo Bettini; G. Graziadei (cox) | | Hungary; Béla Bányai; Antal Szebeny; Miklós Szebeny; György Szebeny; Kálmán Jesze; Sándor Hautzinger; Róbert Éder; Ferenc Kirchknopf; Károly Koch (cox) | |
