= Rowing at the 1912 Summer Olympics – Men's single sculls =

Olympic rowing event

Men's single sculls at the Games of the V Olympiad
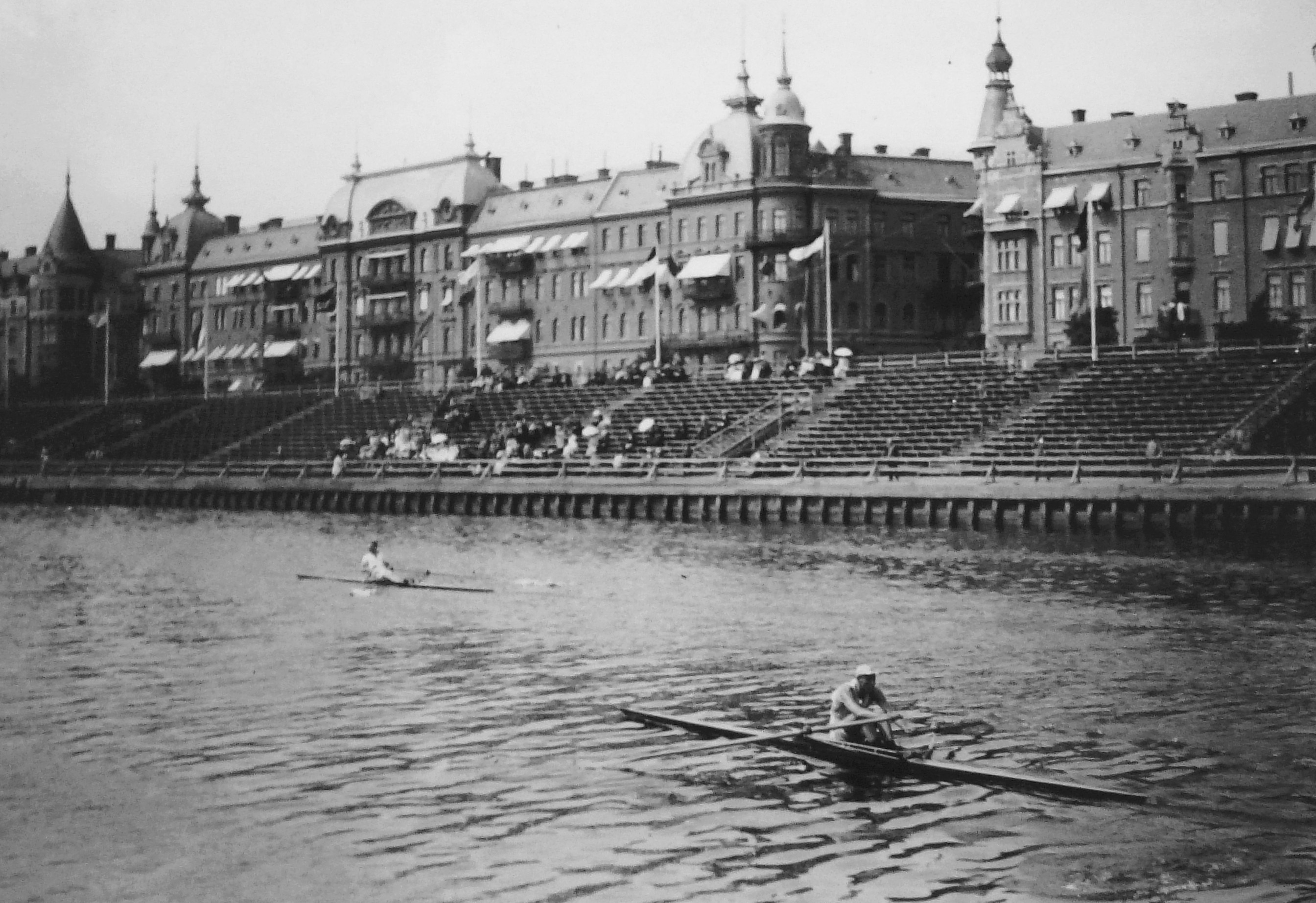
- A race during the competition
- Venue: Djurgårdsbrunnsviken
- Dates: 17–19 July
- Competitors: 13 from 11 nations
- Winning time: 7:47.3

Medalists
1st place, gold medalist(s)		Wally Kinnear; Great Britain
2nd place, silver medalist(s)		Polydore Veirman; Belgium
3rd place, bronze medalist(s)		Everard Butler; Canada
3rd place, bronze medalist(s)		Mart Kuusik; Russian Empire

The men's single sculls was a rowing event held as part of the Rowing at the 1912 Summer Olympics programme. It was the fourth appearance of the event. The competition was held from 17 to 19 July at Djurgårdsbrunnsviken. There were 13 competitors from 11 nations. Each nation could have up to two boats. The event was won by Wally Kinnear of Great Britain, the nation's second consecutive victory in the men's single sculls. The other three medal-winning nations were new to the podium in the event. Kinnear beat Everard Butler of Canada in the semifinals, while Belgium's Polydore Veirman prevailed over Mart Kuusik of the Russian Empire; Butler and Kuusik received bronze medals. Veirman earned silver after falling to Kinnear in the final.

== Background ==
This was the fourth appearance of the event. Rowing had been on the programme in 1896 but was cancelled due to bad weather. The single sculls has been held every time that rowing has been contested, beginning in 1900.

The two favorites in the event were likely Wally Kinnear of Great Britain (the Diamond Challenge Sculls winner in 1910 and 1911) and Polydore Veirman of Belgium, who would win the European championship later in 1912. Another strong contender was Everard Butler of Canada, the top North American sculler and winner of the National Association of Amateur Oarsmen events in 1911 and 1912.

Australasia, Austria, Bohemia, Denmark, Finland, and the Russian Empire each made their debut in the event. Great Britain made its third appearance, most among nations, having missed only the 1904 Games in St. Louis.

== Competition format ==
As in 1908, the 1912 tournament featured four rounds of one-on-one races. Semifinal losers each received bronze medals. For the first time, the Olympic course used the now-standard distance of 2000 metres.

== Schedule ==
Date	Time	Round
Wednesday, 17 July 1912	15:00	First round
Thursday, 18 July 1912	11:00; 11:40; 12:00; 19:30	Quarterfinals 1 and 2 First round heat 1 re-run Quarterfinals 3 and 4 Quarterfinals 1 re-run
Friday, 19 July 1912	12:30; 17:00	Semifinals; Final

== Results ==
=== First round ===
==== Heat 1 ====
Kuusic nearly collided with Heinrich in the first heat, leading to a protest that resulted in the heat being re-rowed the next day; Heinrich was disqualified in the second running of the heat. Three of the heats were walkovers.

Rank	Rower	Nation	Time	Notes
1	Mart Kuusik	Russian Empire	7:45.2	Q
—	Alfred Heinrich	Austria	DSQ	

==== Heat 2 ====
Rank	Rower	Nation	Time	Notes
1	Martin Stahnke	Germany	8:28.8	Q
—	Cecil McVilly	Australasia	DSQ	

==== Heat 3 ====
Rank	Rower	Nation	Time	Notes
1	Everard Butler	Canada	7:55.6	Q
2	Axel Haglund	Finland	8:11.8	

==== Heat 4 ====
Rank	Rower	Nation	Time	Notes
1	Wally Kinnear	Great Britain	7:44.0	Q
2	Kurt Hoffmann	Germany	7:46.9	

==== Heat 5 ====
Ivan Schweizer of Bohemia is listed as starting in this heat in the Official Report; however, it appears he did not actually compete.

Rank	Rower	Nation	Time	Notes
1	József Mészáros	Hungary	8:29.0	Q
—	Ivan Schweizer	Bohemia	DNS	

==== Heat 6 ====
Rank	Rower	Nation	Time	Notes
1	Mikael Simonsen	Denmark	8:14.0	Q
—	Jan Šourek	Bohemia	DNF	

==== Heat 7 ====
Rank	Rower	Nation	Time	Notes
1	Károly Levitzky	Hungary	8:04.0	Q

==== Heat8 ====
Rank	Rower	Nation	Time	Notes
1	Polydore Veirman	Belgium	7:59.2	Q

=== Quarterfinals ===
Mészáros crossed in front of Veirman in the first quarterfinal, resulting in a protest and the contest being held over. The second time, Veirman got an early lead and kept it throughout. Simonsen abandoned the competition, giving Butler a walkover in the second quarterfinal. Kuusic won the final quarterfinal by three lengths, despite having been the only quarterfinalist to have already rowed during the day, in his rematch against Heinrich.

==== Quarterfinal 1 ====
Rank	Rower	Nation	Time	Notes
1	Polydore Veirman	Belgium	7:52.0	Q
2	József Mészáros	Hungary	7:57.9	

==== Quarterfinal 2 ====
Rank	Rower	Nation	Time	Notes
1	Everard Butler	Canada	7:39.9	Q
—	Mikael Simonsen	Denmark	DNS	

==== Quarterfinal 3 ====
Rank	Rower	Nation	Time	Notes
1	Wally Kinnear	Great Britain	7:49.9	Q
2	Martin Stahnke	Germany	7:58.8	

==== Quarterfinal 4 ====
Rank	Rower	Nation	Time	Notes
1	Mart Kuusik	Russian Empire	7:45.2	Q
2	Károly Levitzky	Hungary	7:49.1	

=== Semifinals ===
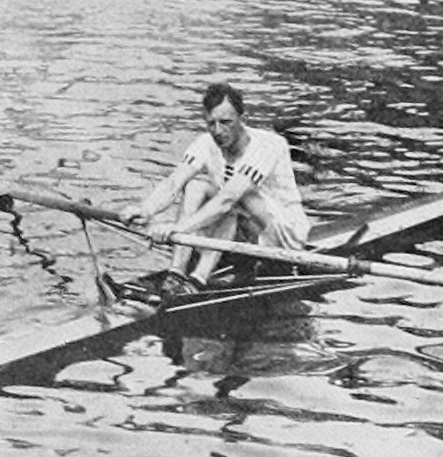
Gold medalist Wally Kinnear

==== Semifinal 1 ====
Rank	Rower	Nation	Time	Notes
1	Polydore Veirman	Belgium	7:41.0	Q
3rd place, bronze medalist(s)	Mart Kuusik	Russian Empire	7:43.9	

==== Semifinal 2 ====
Rank	Rower	Nation	Time	Notes
1	Wally Kinnear	Great Britain	7:37.0	Q
3rd place, bronze medalist(s)	Everard Butler	Canada	7:41.0	

=== Final ===
Rank	Rower	Nation	Time
1st place, gold medalist(s)	Wally Kinnear	Great Britain	7:47.3
2nd place, silver medalist(s)	Polydore Veirman	Belgium	7:56.0

== Results summary ==
Rank	Rower	Nation	First round	Quarterfinals	Semifinals	Final
1st place, gold medalist(s)	Wally Kinnear	Great Britain	7:44.0	7:49.9	7:37.0	7:47.3
2nd place, silver medalist(s)	Polydore Veirman	Belgium	7:59.2	7:52.0	7:41.0	7:56.0
3rd place, bronze medalist(s)	Everard Butler	Canada	7:55.6	7:39.9	7:41.0	Did not advance
3rd place, bronze medalist(s)	Mart Kuusik	Russian Empire	7:45.2	7:45.2	7:43.9	Did not advance
5	Károly Levitzky	Hungary	8:04.0	7:49.1	Did not advance	
5	József Mészáros	Hungary	8:29.0	7:57.9	Did not advance	
5	Martin Stahnke	Germany	8:28.8	7:58.8	Did not advance	
8	Mikael Simonsen	Denmark	8:14.0	DNS	Did not advance	
9	Axel Haglund	Finland	8:11.8	Did not advance		
9	Kurt Hoffmann	Germany	7:46.9	Did not advance		
11	Alfred Heinrich	Austria	DSQ	Did not advance		
11	Cecil McVilly	Australasia	DSQ	Did not advance		
11	Jan Šourek	Bohemia	DNF	Did not advance		
—	Ivan Schweizer	Bohemia	DNS	Did not advance		

== Sources ==
- Bergvall, Erik, ed. (1913). The Official Report of the Olympic Games of Stockholm 1912. Translated by Adams-Ray, Edward. Stockholm: Wahlström & Widstrand.
- Wudarski, Pawel (1999). "Wyniki Igrzysk Olimpijskich" (in Polish).
