= 1908 European Rowing Championships =

- Venue: Lake Lucerne (Vierwaldstättersee)
- Location: Lucerne, Switzerland
- Dates: 30 August 1908
- Nations: Four

The 1908 European Rowing Championships were rowing championships held in the Swizz city of Lucerne. The competition, held on 30 August, was for men only and they competed in five boat classes (M1x, M2x, M2+, M4+, M8+). Many of the rowers had a month earlier competed at the 1908 Summer Olympics in London.

== Medal summary ==
Four nations (Belgium, France, Italy, and Switzerland) competed in five events.

Event	Gold		Silver		Bronze	
Event	Country & rowers	Time	Country & rowers	Time	Country & rowers	Time
M1x	France; Gaston Delaplane		Switzerland; Ernst Hürlimann		(Note: The source does not list further medallists.)	
M2x	Belgium; Jozef Hermans; Xavier Crombet		Italy; Emilio Sacchini; Erminio Dones		Switzerland; H. de Kok; Max Geldner	
M2+	Belgium; Guillaume Visser; Urbain Molmans; Rodolphe Colpaert (cox)		Italy; Ercole Olgeni; Scipione Del Giudice; Giuseppe Mion (cox)		France (Note: The source does not list the names of the team members.)	
M4+	Italy; Ercole Olgeni; Scipione Del Giudice; Mario Tres; Brenno Del Giudice; Giuseppe Mion (cox)		Belgium; Rodolphe Poma; Oscar Dessomville; Polydore Veirman; Oscar Taelman		Switzerland; Albert Breuleux; L. Peter; Th. Schmid; P. Ottiker; E.-W. von Seckendorff (cox)	
M8+	Belgium; Rodolphe Poma; Oscar Dessomville; Polydore Veirman; François Vergucht; Georges Mys; Stanislas Kowalski; Marcel Morimont; Oscar Taelman; Raphael van der Waeren (cox)		France; Roche; Herbinet; Marius Lejeune; Jobelin; Terrail; G. Lejeune; Peyrouni; Besland		Italy; Giovanni Brunialti; Alberto del Nunzio; Archimede de Gregori; Alfredo Tuzi; Armando Garroni; Guido de Cupis; Carlo Gigliesi; Alfonso Serventi	
