= 1909 European Rowing Championships =

- Venue: Seine
- Location: Juvisy-sur-Orge near Paris, France
- Dates: 22 August 1909

The 1909 European Rowing Championships were rowing championships held on the Seine in Juvisy-sur-Orge just upstream of the French capital of Paris on 22 August. The competition was for men only and they competed in five boat classes (M1x, M2x, M2+, M4+, M8+).

== Medal summary ==
Event	Gold		Silver		Bronze	
Event	Country & rowers	Time	Country & rowers	Time	Country & rowers	Time
M1x	Italy; Teodoro Mariani		France; Gaston Delaplane		Belgium; Jozef Hermans	
M2x	Belgium; Daniël Clarembaux; Georges Desenfrans		France; Gaston Delaplane; Francois Rocchesani		Alsace-Lorraine (Note: The source does not list the names of the team members.)	
M2+	Italy; Scipione Del Giudice; Luigi Ermellini; Giuseppe Mion (cox)		France; Mégrat; Profit		Alsace-Lorraine (Note: The source does not list the names of the team members.)	
M4+	Italy; Scipione Del Giudice; Luigi Ermellini; Mario Tres; Brenno Del Giudice; Giuseppe Mion (cox)		Belgium; Rodolphe Poma; Oscar Dessomville; Polydore Veirman; Stanislas Kowalski; Raphael van der Waeren (cox)		Switzerland; Albert Breuleux; L. Peter; Th. Schmid; P. Ottiker; E.-W. von Seckendorff (cox)	
M8+	France; Roche; Herbinet; Gaston Delaplane; Gaston; Mountot; Hermann Barrelet; Motto; Marius Lejeune; G. Lejeune (cox)		Italy; Scipione Del Giudice; Luigi Ermellini; Tullio Rosada; Italo Sambo; Mario Tres; Curzio Del Giudice; Alfredo Stranieri; Brenno Del Giudice; Giuseppe Mion (cox)		(Note: The source does not list further medallists.)	
