= Rowing at the 1906 Intercalated Games =

At the 1906 Summer Olympics in Athens, six rowing events were contested. Now called the Intercalated Games, the 1906 Games are no longer considered as an official Olympic Games by the International Olympic Committee.

== Medal summary ==
Event	Gold	Silver	Bronze
Single sculls	Gaston Delaplane; France	Joseph Larran; France	none awarded
Coxed pairs (1000 m)	Italy; Enrico Bruna; Giorgio Cesana; Emilio Fontanella	Italy; Emilio Cesarana; Francesco Civera; Luigi Diana	France; Gaston Delaplane; Charles Delaporte; Marcel Frébourg
Coxed pairs (1 mile)	Italy; Enrico Bruna; Giorgio Cesana; Emilio Fontanella	Mixed team Max Orban (BEL); Rémy Orban (BEL); Theophilos Psiliakos (GRE)	France; Adolphe Bernard; Joseph Halcet; Jean-Baptiste Mathieu
Coxed four	Italy; Enrico Bruna; Giorgio Cesana; Emilio Fontanella; Giuseppe Poli; Riccardo Zardinoni	France; Gaston Delaplane; Charles Delaporte; Léon Delignières; Paul Echard; Marcel Frébourg	France; Adolphe Bernard; Joseph Halcet; Jean-Baptist Laporte; Jean-Baptist Mathieu; Pierre Sourbé
Naval boats (6 men)	Italy; Team Varese	Greece; Team Spetsai	Greece; Team Hydra
Naval boats (16 men)	Greece; Team Poros	Greece; Team Hydra	Italy; Team Varese

== Medal table ==
Rank	Nation	Gold	Silver	Bronze	Total
1	Italy	4	1	1	6
2	France	1	2	3	6
3	Greece	1	2	1	4
4	Mixed team	0	1	0	1
Totals (4 entries)		6	6	5	17
