= Ernest Barberolle =

French rower (1861–1948)

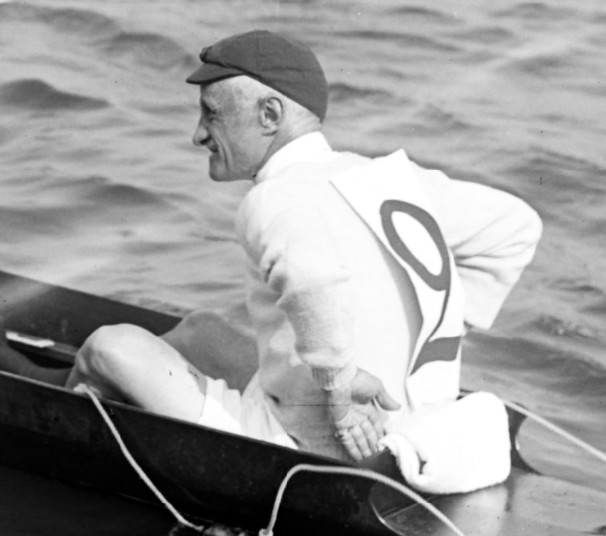
- Barberolle in 1920

Personal information
- Born: 16 October 1861 Paris, France
- Died: 5 September 1948 (aged 86) Joinville-le-Pont, France
- Height: 156 cm (5 ft 1 in)
- Weight: 56 kg (123 lb)
- Relatives: Maurice Monney-Bouton (son-in-law)

Sport
- Sport: Rowing
- Club: Société Nautique de la Marne, Joinville-le-Pont
Medal record
Men's rowing
Representing France
Olympic Games
Silver medal – second place	1920 Antwerp	Coxed pair
European Rowing Championships
Gold medal – first place	1920 Mâcon	Coxed pair
Bronze medal – third place	1923 Como	Coxed pair

Ernest Barberolle (16 October 1861 – 5 September 1948) was a French coxswain who competed in the 1920 Summer Olympics. He won a silver medal, along with Gabriel Poix and Maurice Monney-Bouton in the coxed pair in Antwerp. Monney-Bouton was his son-in-law.
