= Wally Kinnear =

Scottish rower

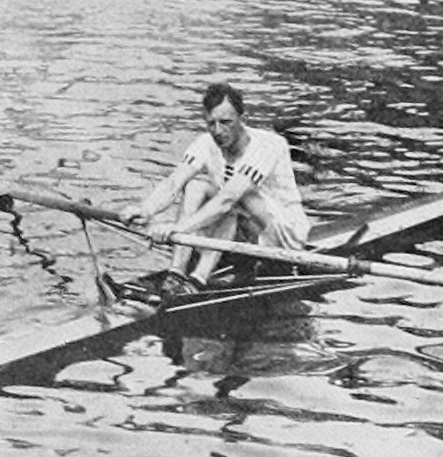
- Kinnear at the 1912 Olympics

Personal information
- Born: William Duthie Kinnear; 3 December 1880 Marykirk, Scotland
- Died: 5 March 1974 (aged 93) Leicester, England

Sport
- Sport: Rowing
- Club: Kensington Rowing Club

Achievements and titles
- Olympic finals: Yes Gold Medal 1912
Medal record
Representing Great Britain
Summer Olympics
Gold medal – first place	1912 Stockholm	single sculls

William Duthie Kinnear (3 December 1880 – 5 March 1974) was a Scottish rower who competed for Great Britain at the 1912 Summer Olympics and won major single scull events prior to the First World War.

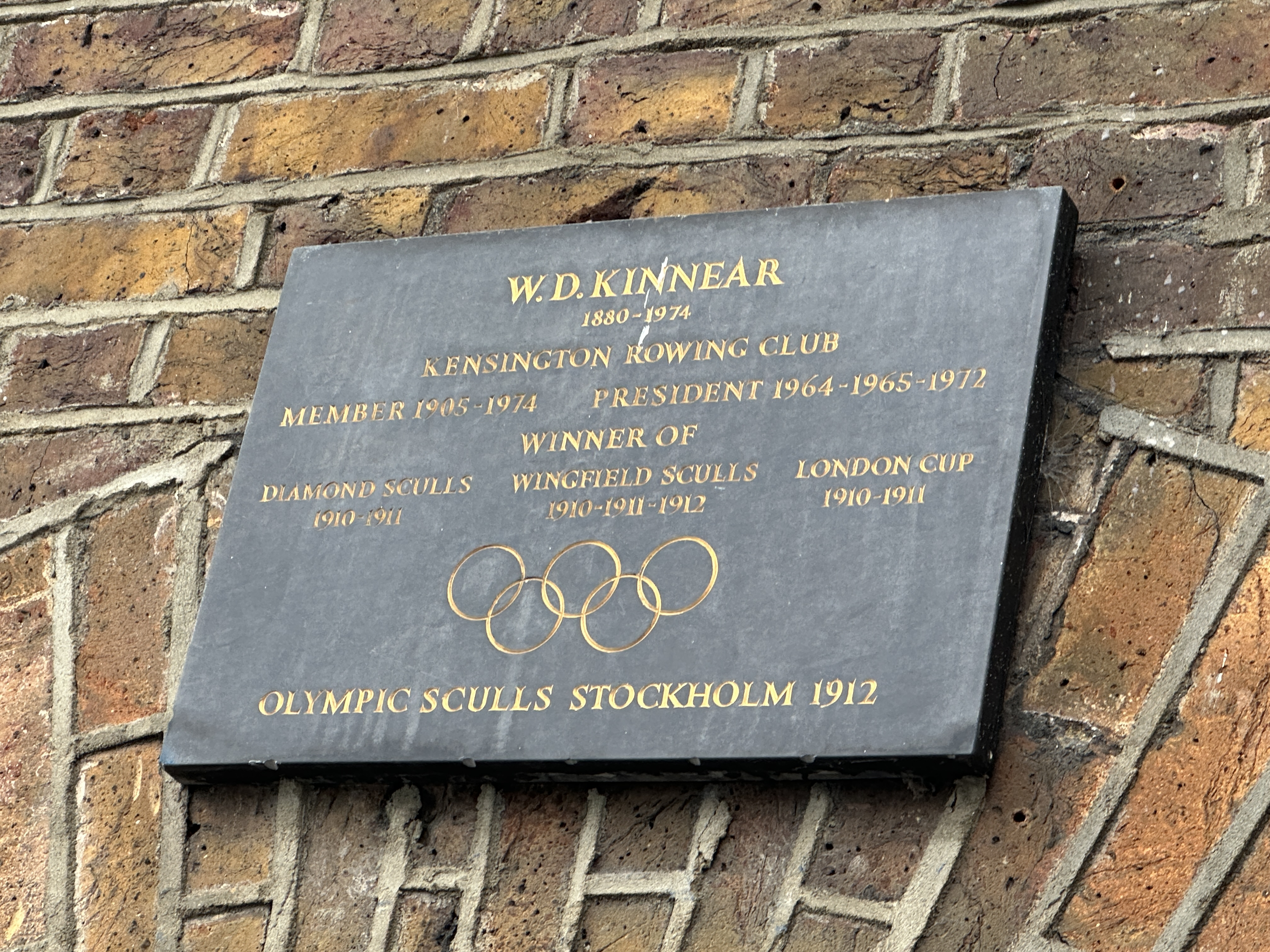
A plaque to Kinnear at Kensington Rowing Club on Lower Mall, Hammersmith, London.

== Early days ==
Better known to his friends as Wally, Kinnear was born in Marykirk, where he became a draper's assistant. He left home in 1902 for a career with the chain store Debenhams in London. Work colleagues introduced him to sculling and he became hooked. He first joined the Cavendish Rowing Club and in 1903 won the West End ARA sculling championship. He repeated this success in 1904 and 1905.

== Road to success ==
Kinnear then joined the Kensington Rowing Club and won many sculling championships on the River Thames over the next few years. In 1910 he won the Diamond Challenge Sculls at Henley Royal Regatta and the Wingfield Sculls when he beat Robert Bourne. In 1911 he beat Eric Powell to win the Diamonds, regained the Wingfield Sculls and won the London Cup at the Metropolitan Regatta to achieve sculling's "Triple Crown".

== Olympics and beyond ==
Kinnear won the gold medal in single sculls, rowing at the 1912 Summer Olympics in Stockholm. He captured the Olympic title comfortably and later the same year secured his third successive Wingfield Sculls. He lost the Wingfield Sculls in 1913 to Jock Wise.

== Later life ==
During World War I Kinnear served with the Royal Naval Air Service and then became a rowing coach. Later he moved to Desford, Leicestershire, where he worked as a security officer. He died of heart failure at Leicester General Hospital on 5 March 1974.

Kinnear was Godfather to writer Eric Newby, as mentioned in Newby's 1962 book "Something Wholesale". He was inducted into the Scottish Sports Hall of Fame on 12 March 2007.
