= Rémy Orban =

Belgian rower

Personal information
- Born: Joseph Albert Célestin Rémy Orban; 9 April 1880
- Died: 1951 (aged 70–71)
- Weight: 79 kg (174 lb)
- Relatives: Max Orban (brother)

Sport
- Sport: Rowing
- Club: Royal Club Nautique de Gand
Medal record
Men's rowing
Representing Belgium
Olympic Games
| Silver medal – second place | 1908 London | Eight |
Intercalated Games
| Silver medal – second place | 1906 Athens | Coxed pair 1 mile |
European Rowing Championships
| Gold medal – first place | 1906 Pallanza | Eight |

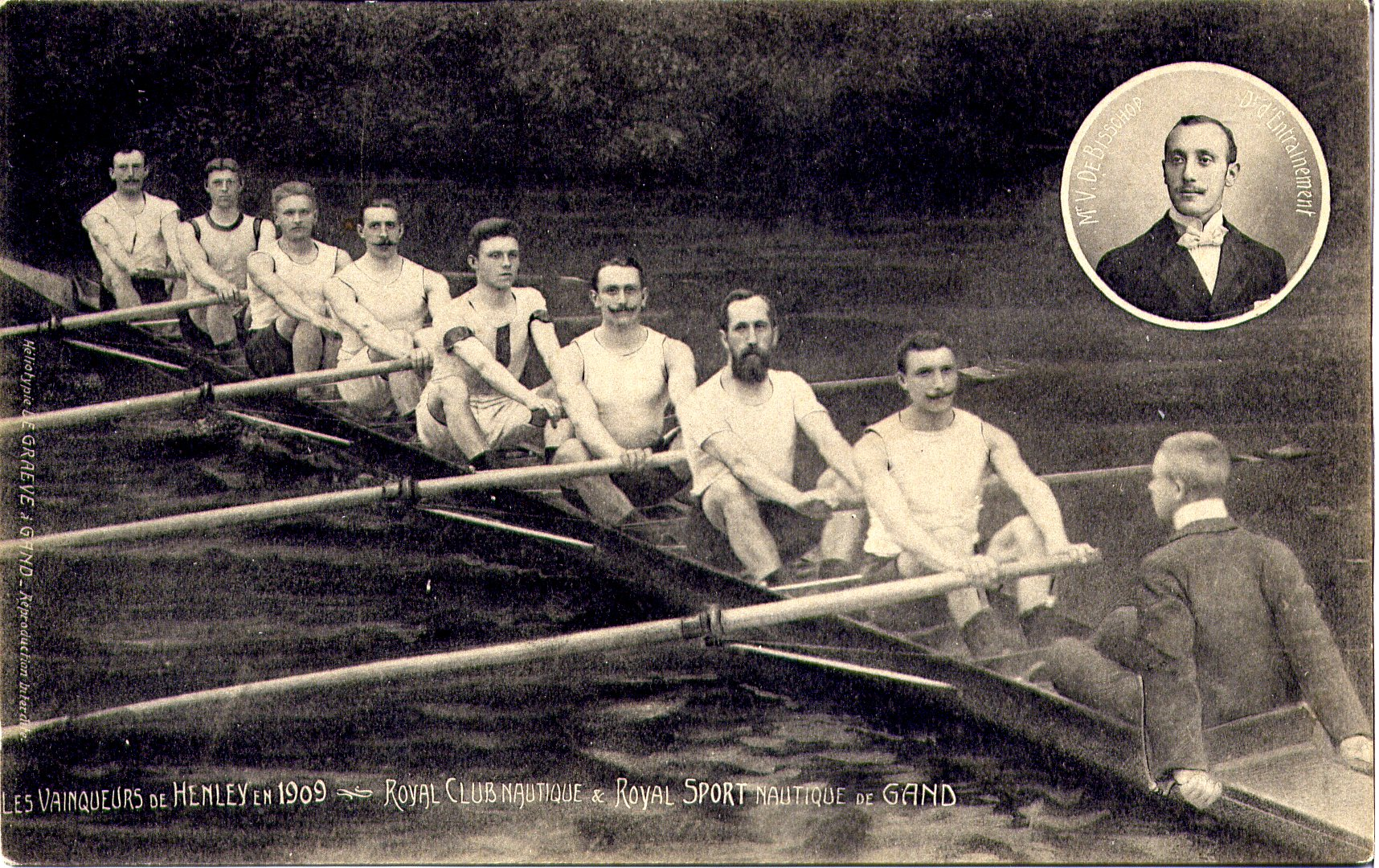

Joseph Albert Célestin Rémy Orban (9 April 1880 – 1951) was a Belgian rower who won a silver medal in men's eight at the 1908 Summer Olympics.
