= Rodolphe Poma =

Belgian rower (1885–1954)

Personal information
- Born: Rodolphe Antoine Pierre Thérèse Poma; 12 October 1885 Ghent, Belgium
- Died: 12 October 1954 (aged 69)
- Height: 183 cm (6 ft 0 in)
- Weight: 70 kg (154 lb)

Sport
- Sport: Rowing
- Club: KRCG, Gent
Medal record
Men's rowing
Representing Belgium
Olympic Games
Silver medal – second place	1900 Paris	Eight
Silver medal – second place	1908 London	Eight
European Rowing Championships
Gold medal – first place	1906 Pallanza	Eight
Gold medal – first place	1907 Strasbourg	Eight
Silver medal – second place	1908 Lucerne	Coxed four
Gold medal – first place	1908 Lucerne	Eight
Silver medal – second place	1909 Paris	Coxed four

Rodolphe Antoine Pierre Thérèse Poma (12 October 1885 – 12 October 1954), also known as Rudolph Poma, was a Belgian rower who competed in the 1900 Summer Olympics and 1908 Summer Olympics for Belgium. He competed in 1900 as coxswain of the Royal Club Nautique de Gand which won the silver medal in the eight and in 1908 as rower of the same club which won the silver medal in the eight.
