= Paul Piaget (rowing) =

Swiss coxswain

Personal information
- Born: 1905
- Died: unknown

Sport
- Sport: Rowing
- Club: SN Genève, Cologny
Medal record
Men's rowing
Representing Switzerland
Olympic Games
Bronze medal – third place	1920 Antwerp	Coxed pair
European Rowing Championships
Silver medal – second place	1920 Mâcon	Coxed pair

Paul Piaget (born 1905, date of death unknown) was a Swiss rowing coxswain who competed in the 1920 Summer Olympics. In 1920, he won the bronze medal of the Swiss boat in the coxed pair event.
