= Rowing at the 1920 Summer Olympics – Men's coxed pair =

Olympic rowing event

Men's coxed pair at the Games of the VII Olympiad
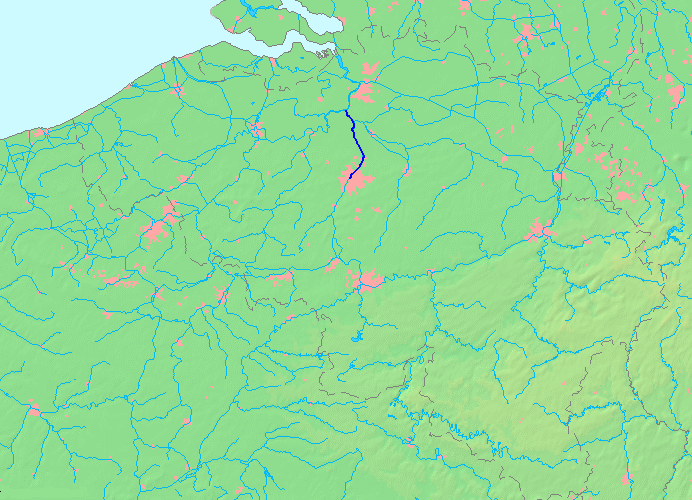
- Location of the canal
- Venue: Brussels–Scheldt Maritime Canal
- Dates: 28–29 August 1920
- Competitors: 12 from 4 nations
- Winning time: 7:56.0

Medalists
1st place, gold medalist(s)		Ercole Olgeni; Giovanni Scatturin; Guido De Felip (cox); Italy
2nd place, silver medalist(s)		Maurice Monney-Bouton; Gabriel Poix; Ernest Barberolle (cox); France
3rd place, bronze medalist(s)		Édouard Candeveau; Alfred Felber; Paul Piaget (cox); Switzerland

The men's coxed pair event was part of the rowing programme at the 1920 Summer Olympics. The competition was held on 28 and 29 August 1920. It was the second appearance of the event, which had previously been held only at the inaugural rowing competitions in 1900. Four boats, each from a different nation, competed. The event was won by the Italian boat in that nation's debut in the event, with Ercole Olgeni and Giovanni Scatturin the rowers and Guido De Felip the coxswain. France's crew (Maurice Monney-Bouton, Gabriel Poix, and cox Ernest Barberolle) took silver, the second consecutive silver for France. Switzerland (Édouard Candeveau, Alfred Felber, and cox Paul Piaget) earned bronze.

== Background ==
This was the second appearance of the event. Rowing had been on the programme in 1896 but was cancelled due to bad weather. The men's coxed pair was one of the original four events in 1900, but was not held in 1904, 1908, or 1912. It returned to the programme after World War I and was held every Games from 1924 to 1992, when it (along with the men's coxed four) was replaced with the men's lightweight double sculls and men's lightweight coxless four.

Italy and Switzerland each made their debut in the event. Belgium and France each made their second appearance, having previously competed in 1900.

== Competition format ==
The coxed pair event featured three-person boats, with two rowers and a coxswain. It was a sweep rowing event, with the rowers each having one oar (and thus each rowing on one side). The competition featured two rounds (semifinals and a final). There were three semifinals; the winner of each advanced to the final. As there were only four boats after withdrawals, two of the three semifinals ended up being walkovers. The three-boat final determined the medals. The course used the 2000 metres distance that became the Olympic standard in 1912.

== Schedule ==
Date	Time	Round
Saturday, 28 August 1920	16:05	Semifinals
Sunday, 29 August 1920	16:00	Final

== Results ==
=== Semifinals ===
==== Semifinal 1 ====
Rank	Rowers	Coxswain	Nation	Time	Notes
1	Ercole Olgeni; Giovanni Scatturin	Guido De Felip	Italy	8:10.0	Q
2	Georges Van Den Bossche; Oscar Van Den Bossche	René Van Damme	Belgium	8:25.0	

==== Semifinal 2 ====
Rank	Rowers	Coxswain	Nation	Time	Notes
1	Gabriel Poix; Maurice Monney-Bouton	Ernest Barberolle	France	9:15.0	Q

==== Semifinal 3 ====
Rank	Rowers	Coxswain	Nation	Time	Notes
1	Édouard Candeveau; Alfred Felber	Paul Piaget	Switzerland	8:50.0	Q

=== Final ===
Rank	Rowers	Coxswain	Nation	Time
1st place, gold medalist(s)	Ercole Olgeni; Giovanni Scatturin	Guido De Felip	Italy	7:56.0
2nd place, silver medalist(s)	Gabriel Poix; Maurice Monney-Bouton	Ernest Barberolle	France	7:57.0
3rd place, bronze medalist(s)	Édouard Candeveau; Alfred Felber	Paul Piaget	Switzerland	Unknown

== Results summary ==
Rank	Rowers	Coxswain	Nation	Semifinals	Final
1st place, gold medalist(s)	Ercole Olgeni; Giovanni Scatturin	Guido De Felip	Italy	8:10.0	7:56.0
2nd place, silver medalist(s)	Gabriel Poix; Maurice Monney-Bouton	Ernest Barberolle	France	9:15.0	7:57.0
3rd place, bronze medalist(s)	Édouard Candeveau; Alfred Felber	Paul Piaget	Switzerland	8:50.0	Unknown
4	Georges Van Den Bossche; Oscar Van Den Bossche	René Van Damme	Belgium	8:25.0	Did not advance

== Sources ==
- Belgium Olympic Committee (1957). Olympic Games Antwerp 1920: Official Report (PDF) (in French). Archived from the original (PDF) on 5 October 2013.
- Wudarski, Pawel (1999). "Wyniki Igrzysk Olimpijskich" (in Polish).
