= Everard Butler =

Canadian rower

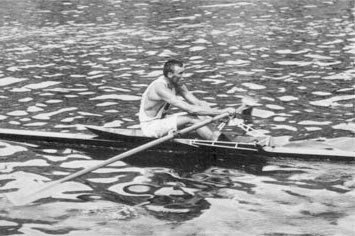
- Butler at the 1912 Olympics

Personal information
- Born: Everard Burnside Butler; December 28, 1885 Toronto, Ontario, Canada
- Died: November 23, 1958 (aged 73) Bournemouth, England
- Height: 1.83 m (6 ft 0 in)
- Weight: 72 kg (159 lb)

Sport
- Sport: Rowing
- Club: Argonaut Rowing Club, Toronto
Medal record
Men's rowing
Representing Canada
Olympic Games
Bronze medal – third place	1912 Stockholm	Single sculls

Everard Burnside Butler (December 28, 1885 – November 23, 1958) was a Canadian rower who won a bronze medal in the single sculls at the 1912 Summer Olympics.

Butler started training in rowing in 1908 and, the next year won his first junior race. By 1910, he rowed as a senior in the United States and Canada, and in 1911, he won two US national titles in the single sculls and quarter-mile dash. He defended those titles in 1912 and won the quarter-mile dash again in 1914. Butler fought in World War I with the 12th Artillery Brigade and suffered extensive injuries in a mustard gas attack in France. Consequently, after the war, he retired from major rowing competitions and worked as an accountant. He returned to the army during World War II and served with the 48th Highlanders and Royal Canadian Ordnance Corps.
