= Marius Lejeune =

French rower (1882–1949)

Personal information
- Nationality: French
- Born: 2 November 1882 Amiens, France
- Died: 5 September 1949 (aged 66)

Sport
- Sport: Rowing
Medal record
Men's rowing
Representing France
European Rowing Championships
Silver medal – second place	1908 Lucerne	Eight
Gold medal – first place	1909 Paris	Eight

Marius Lejeune (2 November 1882 – 5 September 1949) was a French rower. Lejeune won medals with the men's eight at the 1908 and 1909 European Rowing Championships. He also competed in the men's eight event at the 1912 Summer Olympics.
