= Maurice Monney-Bouton =

French rower (1892–1965)

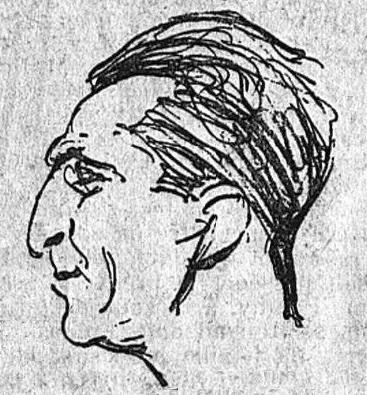
- Monney-Bouton in 1924

Personal information
- Born: Maurice Paul René Bouton; 24 February 1892 Paris, France
- Died: 15 June 1965 (aged 73) Clichy, Hauts-de-Seine, France
- Relatives: Ernest Barberolle (father-in-law)

Sport
- Sport: Rowing
Medal record
Men's rowing
Representing France
Olympic Games
Silver medal – second place	1920 Antwerp	Coxed pair
Silver medal – second place	1924 Paris	Coxless pair
European Rowing Championships
Gold medal – first place	1913 Ghent	Coxed pair
Gold medal – first place	1920 Mâcon	Coxed pair

Maurice Paul René Monney-Bouton (24 February 1892 in Paris – 15 June 1965) was a French rower who competed in the 1920 Summer Olympics and in the 1924 Summer Olympics.

In 1920 he won the silver medal as member of the French boat in the coxed pair event. Four years later he won his second silver medal this time with his partner Georges Piot in the coxless pair event.
