= Erminio Dones =

Italian rower (1882–1945)

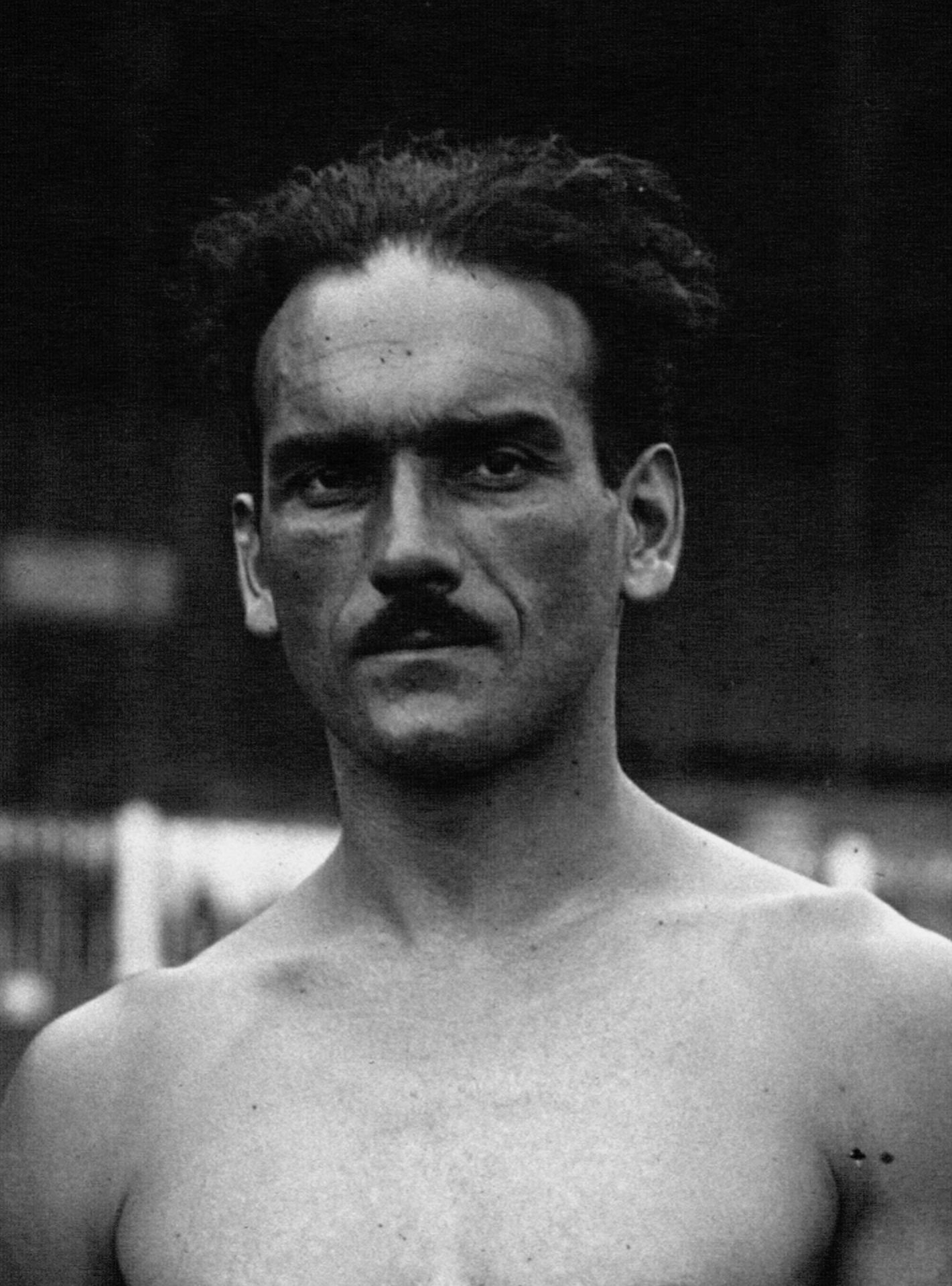
- Dones in 1919

Personal information
- Born: 12 December 1882 Venice, Italy
- Died: 6 May 1945 (aged 62) Zibido San Giacomo, Italy

Sport
- Sport: Rowing
Medal record
Men's rowing
Representing Italy
Olympic Games
Silver medal – second place	1920 Antwerp	Double sculls
European Rowing Championships
Bronze medal – third place	1905 Ghent	Eight
Bronze medal – third place	1907 Strasbourg	Single sculls
Gold medal – first place	1907 Strasbourg	Double sculls
Silver medal – second place	1908 Lucerne	Double sculls
Gold medal – first place	1912 Geneva	Double sculls
Silver medal – second place	1922 Barcelona	Double sculls
Bronze medal – third place	1923 Como	Double sculls

Erminio Dones (12 December 1882 – 6 May 1945) was an Italian rower who competed in the 1920 Summer Olympics. In 1920 he won the silver medal with his partner Pietro Annoni in the double sculls event.
