= 1913 European Rowing Championships =

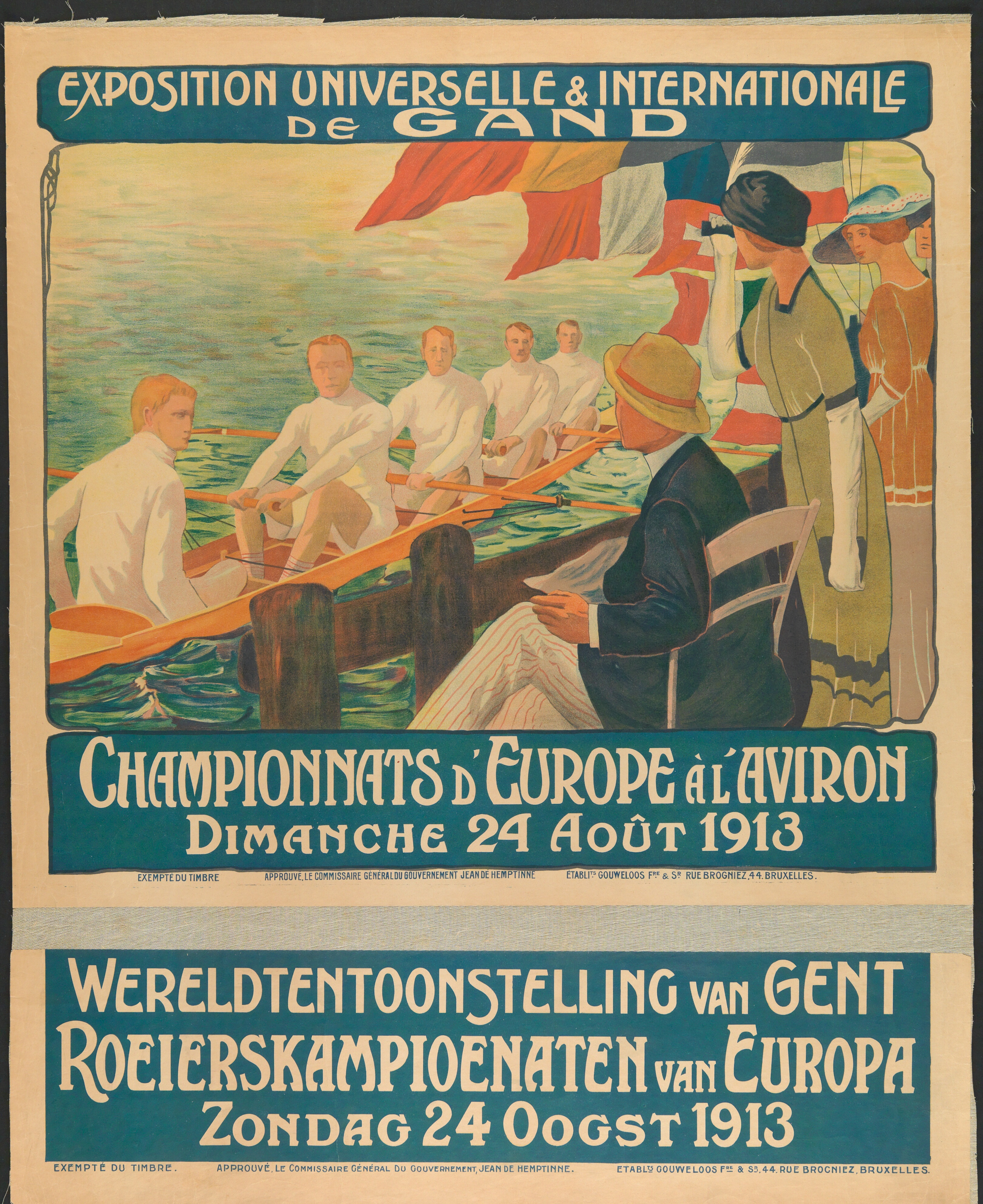
- Poster advertising the 1913 Championships
- Venue: Ghent–Terneuzen Canal
- Location: Ghent, Belgium
- Dates: 24 August 1913

The 1913 European Rowing Championships were rowing championships held on the Ghent–Terneuzen Canal in the Belgian city of Ghent. The competition was for men only and they competed in five boat classes (M1x, M2x, M2+, M4+, M8+). These were the last European Rowing Championships before the annual regatta was interrupted by WWI; the next championships would be held in 1920 in Mâcon.

== Background ==
It was the first time that the German rowing federation sent competitors to the European Rowing Championships and they were immediately successful, winning two out of the five boat classes (M1x and M8+). The single sculls competition descended into a farce, with the umpire twice calling for a restart. The Italian rower Giuseppe Sinigaglia and the Russian rower Anatol Peresselenzeff, who started for France, were then disqualified. In the eventual final Polydore Veirman capsized and the German rower Friedrich Graf was the only one to reach the finish line.

== Medal summary ==
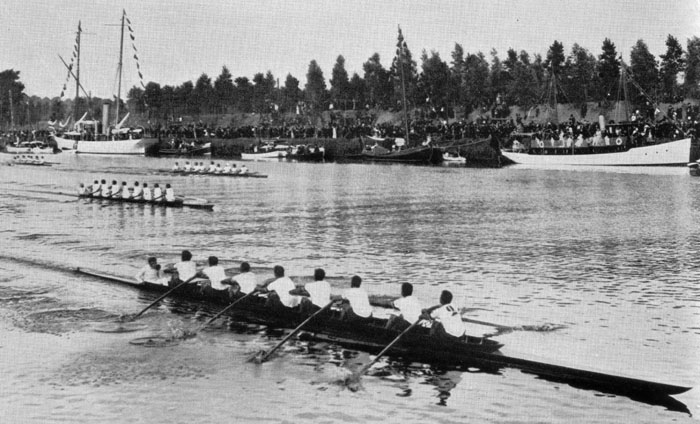
The German eight on its way to gold in Ghent

Event	Gold		Silver		Bronze	
Event	Country & rowers	Time	Country & rowers	Time	Country & rowers	Time
M1x	Germany; Friedrich Graf		(Note: Only Graf reached the finish line in the final.)			
M2x	France; Hermann Barrelet; Anatol Peresselenzeff		Italy; Giuseppe Sinigaglia; Nino Torlaschi		Germany; Bernhard von Gaza; Wenzel Joesten	
M2+	France; Gabriel Poix; Maurice Monney-Bouton		Switzerland; Charles Holzmann; Alfred Felber		Italy; Franco Gianolio; Giorgio Lajolo; Gustavo Canton (cox)	
M4+	Switzerland; Hans Walter; Max Rudolf; Paul Schmid; Walter Schoeller; Charles Muhr (cox)		Germany; Werner Furthmann; Max Vetter; Oscar Cordes; Lorenz Eismayer; Johann-Baptist Strohschnitter (cox)		France (Note: The source does not list the names of the team members.)	
M8+	Germany; Werner Furthmann; Josef Fremersdorf; Richard Piez; Kurt Hoffmann; Oscar Cordes; Max Vetter; Georg Oertel; Lorenz Eismayer; Johann Baptist Strohschnitter (cox)	6:35	Switzerland; Hans Walter; Max Rudolf; Paul Schmid; F. Bon; Georges Thoma; Wilhelm Walter; H. Studer; Walter Schoeller; A. Wolf (cox)	6:42	Italy; Emilio Lucca; Enrico Marinoni; Ettore Lucioni; Giuseppe Sinigaglia; Franco Lajolo; Giorgio Gianolio; Nino Torlaschi; Alfredo Taroni; Plinio Urio (cox)	6:46
