= Marcel Frébourg =

French rower (1892–1950)

Personal information
- Born: Marcel Gaston Charles Frébourg; 2 March 1892 Levallois-Perret, France
- Died: 2 March 1950 (aged 58) Paris, France

Sport
- Sport: Rowing
- Club: SNBS, Courbevoie
Medal record
Men's rowing
Representing France
Intercalated Games
Bronze medal – third place	1906 Athens	Coxed pair (1000 m)
Silver medal – second place	1906 Athens	Coxed four
European Rowing Championships
Silver medal – second place	1906 Pallanza	Eight

Marcel Gaston Charles Frébourg (2 March 1892 – 2 March 1950) was a French coxswain.

Frébourg competed at the 1906 Intercalated Games in Athens with the men's coxed four where they won silver. In the men's coxed pair (1 km) he won a bronze medal. In the 1 mile event for coxed pairs, he finished outside of the medals. At the 1906 European Rowing Championships, he won a silver medal with the men's eight.
