= Teodoro Mariani =

Italian rower

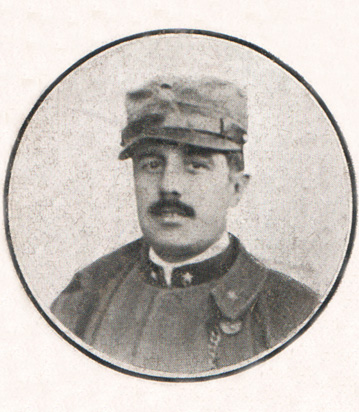
- Mariani in 1915

Personal information
- Born: 28 February 1882 Como, Italy
- Died: 2 August 1916 (aged 34) Monte Zebio, Italy

Sport
- Sport: Rowing
- Club: Canottieri Lario
Medal record
Men's rowing
Representing Italy
European Rowing Championships
Gold medal – first place	1909 Paris	Single sculls
Gold medal – first place	1911 Como	Double sculls

Teodoro Mariani (28 February 1882 – 2 August 1916) was an Italian rower.

Mariani was born in Como in 1882. He received his education at Caio Plinio Secondo in Como, graduating in 1900 with a major in accounting.

In 1892, he joined the ASDG Comense 1872, where he competed in various disciplines. After some time, he focused on gymnastics before switching to rowing. He left his original club and joined Canottieri Lario, a local rowing club. In 1908, he became the Italian champion in Salò in single sculls. At the 1909 European Rowing Championships held near Paris, he won the European champion in single sculls. At the 1911 European Rowing Championships in his hometown of Como, he became the European champion in double sculls, partnering with Giuseppe Sinigaglia, a friend from his time at ASDG Comense 1872.

In 1915, Mariani enlisted for WWI. He was killed by shrapnel on 2 August 1916, while fighting on Monte Zebio. In his honor, a street named Via Teodoro Mariani and the municipal gym Teodoro Mariani, located in Via Nazario Sauro in Como, are named for him.

== Bibliography ==
- Casarola, Maurizio Lo chiamavano Sina, Nordpress Edizioni, 2007.
- Bazzi, Mario Il gigante buono, Tipografia Commerciale Prini & C., Como.
