= Guido De Felip =

Italian rowing coxswain

Olympic medal record

Men's rowing
Gold medal – first place	1920 Antwerp	Coxed pair

Guido De Felip (21 September 1904 – 21 September 1968) was an Italian rowing coxswain, born in Venice, who competed in the 1920 Summer Olympics.

In 1920 he coxed the Italian boat which won the gold medal in the coxed pair event.
