= Anatol Peresselenzeff =

Russian rower and rowing coach

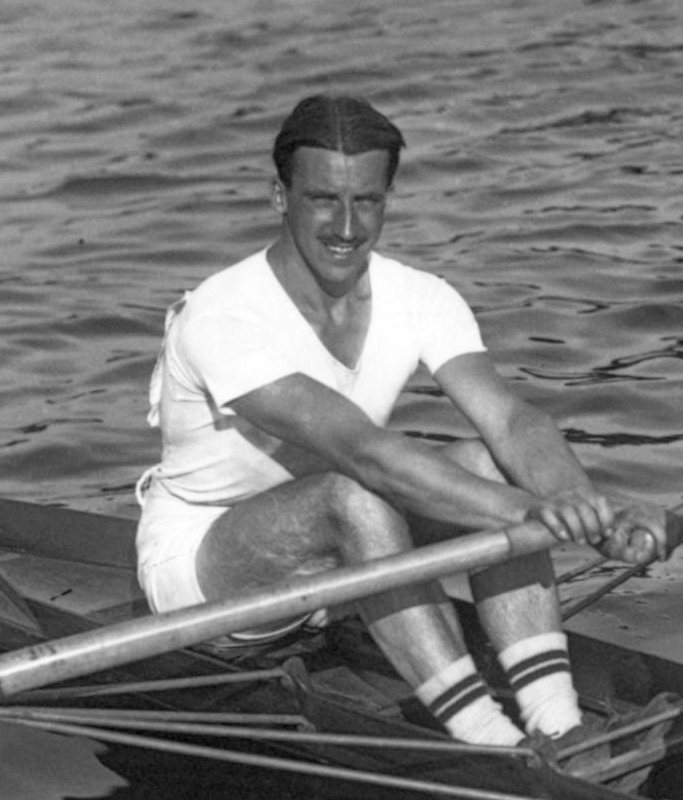
- Peresselenzeff in 1913

Personal information
- Born: Anatoly Andreevich Pereselentsev; 1889 Moscow, Russia
- Died: 1956 (aged 67) Moscow, Russia
- Height: 185 cm (6 ft 1 in)
- Weight: 80 kg (176 lb)

Sport
- Sport: Rowing
Medal record
Men's rowing
Representing France
European Rowing Championships
Gold medal – first place	1913 Ghent	Double sculls

Anatol Peresselenzeff (Russian: Анатолий Андреевич Переселенцев; 1889–1956) was a pioneer Russian rower and rowing coach. Competing in single sculls he won both the Russian (1908, 1909 and 1914) and French championships. In 1913 he also won the European title in double sculls, rowing with Hermann Barrelet; he was disqualified in the single sculls race, together with Giuseppe Sinigaglia.

Peresselenzeff was born in a wealthy family and took up rowing in 1903. In 1909 his parents sent him to Germany and France to study commerce. He returned to Russia in 1914 and retired from competitions in 1923, after winning his last Russian title, in the double sculls with Yakov Shestoperov. He then coached rowers at Spartak Moscow and Russian State University of Physical Education, Sport, Youth and Tourism, using French textbooks which he translated into Russian. In 1941 he was arrested as part of Stalin's political repressions and released in 1948. He died in 1956.

Peresselenzeff was married twice, first to Nina Teplyakova who was a leading Soviet tennis player, and then to Katya, a woman 15 years his junior.
