= Oscar Taelman =

Belgian rower

Personal information
- Born: Oscar Joseph Taelman; 5 October 1877 Ghent, Belgium
- Died: 23 October 1945 (aged 68) Ghent, Belgium
- Weight: 71 kg (157 lb)

Sport
- Sport: Rowing
- Club: KRCG, Gent
Medal record
Men's rowing
Representing Belgium
Olympic Games
Silver medal – second place	1908 London	Eight
European Rowing Championships
Gold medal – first place	1902 Strasbourg	Eight
Gold medal – first place	1907 Strasbourg	Eight
Silver medal – second place	1908 Lucerne	Coxed Four
Gold medal – first place	1908 Lucerne	Eight

Oscar Joseph Taelman (5 October 1877 – 23 October 1945) was a rower who competed in the 1908 Summer Olympics for Belgium. He competed as part of the Royal Club Nautique de Gand which won the silver medal in the eight.
