= Hardturm =

Football stadium in Zürich, Switzerland

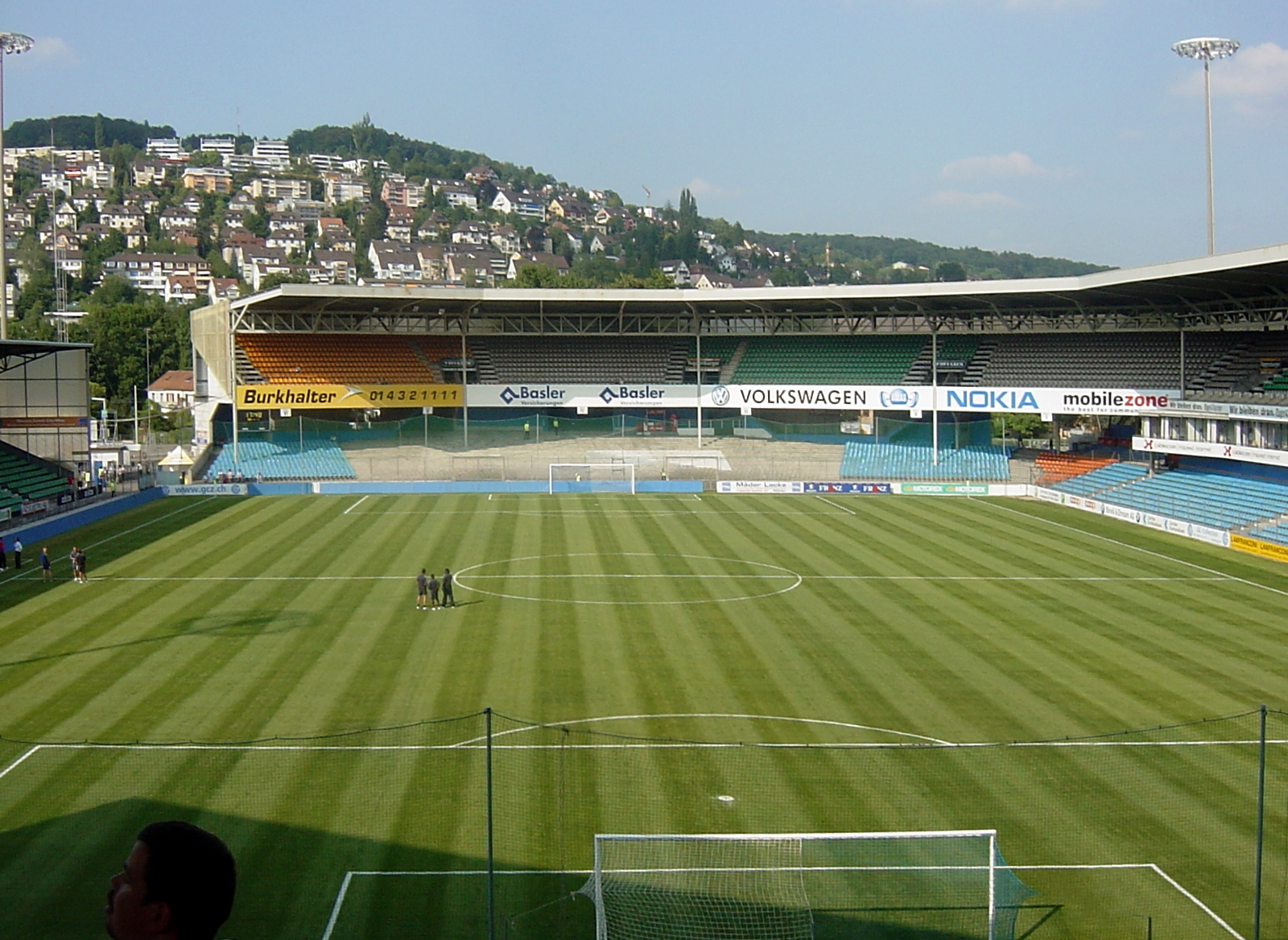
- Interactive map of Hardturm
- Location: Zürich, Switzerland
- Coordinates: 47°23′35″N 8°30′17″E
- Operator: Grasshopper Club Zürich
- Capacity: 17,666 (2007); 27,500 (1929)
- Surface: Grass

Construction
- Opened: 1929 (Football)
- Renovated: 1934, 1968, 1986, 1998
- Closed: 1 September 2007
- Demolished: December 2008 – March 2009

Tenant
- Grasshopper Club Zürich

The Hardturm was a football stadium located in Zürich's Kreis 5. Opened in 1929, it was the home of the Grasshopper Club Zürich until it closed in 2007. It was a host stadium for the 1954 FIFA World Cup.

The land for the stadium was bought by Walter Schoeller who passed it on his club free of charge. When the stadium was opened in 1929 it could hold 27,500 spectators. After many reconstructions the capacity was 38,000 in 1986, on time for the 100-Year Anniversary of the Grasshopper Club Zürich. Before closing, Hardturm could hold 17,666 spectators with standing areas for the home and away fans. In international games the Hardturm could hold 16,600 spectators with seating places in all areas.

During re-construction of the Letzigrund stadium, Grasshoppers shared use of the Hardturm with local rivals FC Zürich for the 2006–07 season. This led to protests by Grasshopper fans.

The Hardturm stadium closed in September 2007. Grasshoppers now play at the Letzigrund Stadium.

Hardturm's demolition started in December 2008 and a new stadium, Stadion Zürich is planned on the ground of the Hardturm, but the project has been stalled.

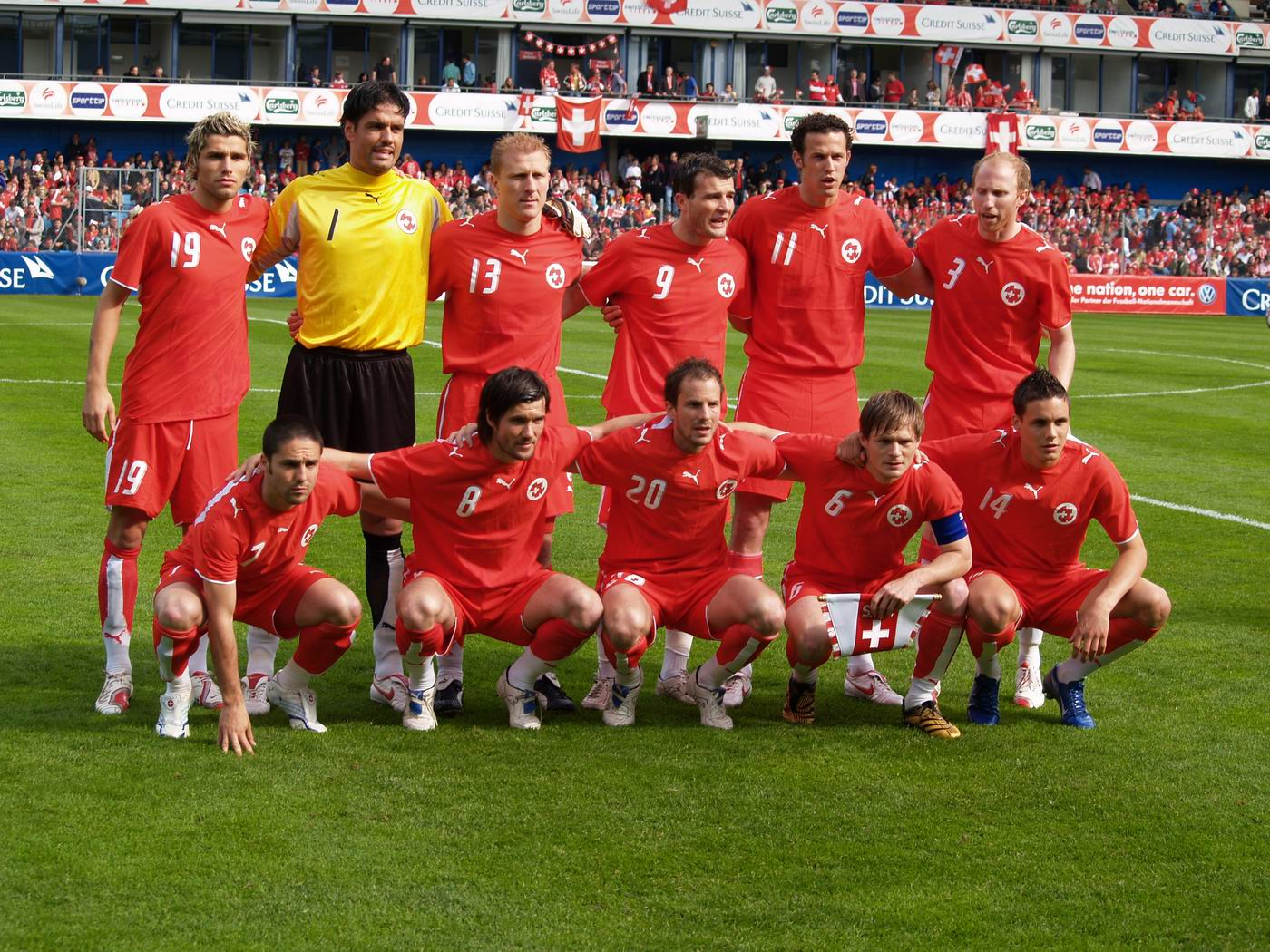
Swiss national football team at Hardturm (May 2006)

== See also ==
- List of football stadiums in Switzerland
