= Georges Mys =

Belgian rower

Personal information
- Born: Georges Victor Liévin Mathieu Mys; 26 March 1880 Ghent, Belgium
- Died: 7 November 1952 (aged 72) Ghent, Belgium
- Weight: 70 kg (154 lb)

Sport
- Sport: Rowing
- Club: Royal Club Nautique de Gand
Medal record
Men's rowing
Representing Belgium
Olympic Games
Silver medal – second place	1908 London	Eight
European Rowing Championships
Gold medal – first place	1907 Strasbourg	Eight
Gold medal – first place	1908 Lucerne	Eight

Georges Victor Liévin Mathieu Mys (26 March 1880 – 7 November 1952) was a rower who competed in the 1908 Summer Olympics for Belgium. He competed as part of the Royal Club Nautique de Gand which won the silver medal in the men's eight.
