= Marcel Morimont =

Belgian rower

Personal information
- Born: Marcel Charles Alphonse Morimont; 9 June 1886 Ghent, Belgium
- Died: unknown
- Weight: 68 kg (150 lb)

Sport
- Sport: Rowing
- Club: Royal Club Nautique de Gand
Medal record
Men's rowing
Representing Belgium
Olympic Games
Silver medal – second place	1908 London	Eight
European Rowing Championships
Gold medal – first place	1906 Pallanza	Eight
Gold medal – first place	1907 Strasbourg	Eight
Gold medal – first place	1908 Lucerne	Eight

Marcel Charles Alphonse Morimont (born 9 June 1886, date of death unknown) was a rower who competed in the 1908 Summer Olympics for Belgium. He competed as part of the Royal Club Nautique de Gand which won the silver medal in the men's eight.
