= Charles Delaporte =

French rower and cyclist

Personal information
- Full name: Charles Pierre Victor Delaporte
- Born: 21 July 1880 Paris, France
- Died: 1 May 1949 (aged 68) Neuilly-sur-Seine, France

Sport
- Sport: Rowing; Cycling
- Club: SNBS, Courbevoie
Medal record
Men's rowing
Representing France
Intercalated Games
Bronze medal – third place	1906 Athens	Coxed pair (1000 m)
Silver medal – second place	1906 Athens	Coxed four
European Rowing Championships
Silver medal – second place	1906 Pallanza	Eight

Charles Pierre Victor Delaporte (21 July 1880 – 1 May 1949) was a French rower and cyclist.

Delaporte was born in 1880. He competed in the men's single sculls event at the 1900 Summer Olympics. Delaporte competed at the 1906 Intercalated Games in Athens with the men's coxed four where they won silver. In the men's coxed pair (1 km) he won a bronze medal. In the 1 mile event for coxed pairs, he finished outside of the medals. He also competed in cycling (sprint) at the Intercalated Games and placed outside the medals.

At the 1906 European Rowing Championships, he won a silver medal with the men's eight.
