= 1911 European Rowing Championships =

- Venue: Lake Como
- Location: Lombardy region, Italy
- Dates: 10 September 1911

The 1911 European Rowing Championships were rowing championships held on Lake Como in the Italian Lombardy region on 10 September. The competition was for men only and they competed in five boat classes (M1x, M2x, M2+, M4+, M8+).

== Medal summary ==
Event	Gold		Silver		Bronze	
Event	Country & rowers	Time	Country & rowers	Time	Country & rowers	Time
M1x	Italy; Giuseppe Sinigaglia		Belgium; Polydore Veirman		France; Gaston Delaplane	
M2x	Italy; Giuseppe Sinigaglia; Teodoro Mariani		France; Gaston Delaplane; Francois Rocchesani		Belgium; Georges Desenfans; Jozef Hermans	
M2+	Italy; Ercole Olgeni; Enrico Bruna; G. Graziadei (cox)		Switzerland; F. de la Torre di Stampa; Victor Henny; Charles Muhr (cox)		Belgium; Guillaume Visser; Urbain Molmans	
M4+	Switzerland; Hans Walter; Paul Schmid; T.O. Schmid; Conrad Wirth; Henry Gowthorpe (cox)		Italy; Scipione Del Giudice; Luigi Ermellini; Mario Tres; Brenno Del Giudice; Giuseppe Mion (cox)		Belgium; Ernest Kaempf; Léopold Renwart; Charles Lalemand; Albert Piron	
M8+	Italy; Scipione Del Giudice; Luigi Ermellini; Tullio Rosada; Giovanni Nenzi; Mario Tres; Gino Solesin; Alfredo Stranieri; Brenno Del Giudice; Giuseppe Mion (cox)		Switzerland; Hans Walter; Paul Schmid; T.O. Schmid; Conrad Wirth; Georges Thoma; Max Rudolf; Alexander Müller; Walter Schoeller; Henry Gowthorpe (cox)		France; Daniel Donard; Malcolm Brown; Gaston Delaplane; Georges Flosse; F. Malafosse; J. de Molenes; Francois Rocchesani; F. Meller (cox)	
