= Róbert Éder =

Hungarian rower

Personal information
- Nationality: Hungarian
- Born: 16 October 1888
- Died: Unknown
- Weight: 74 kg (163 lb)

Sport
- Sport: Rowing
- Club: Pannónia Evezős Egylet
Medal record
Men's rowing
Representing Hungary
European Rowing Championships
Bronze medal – third place	1910 Ostend	Eight

Róbert Éder (born 16 October 1888, date of death unknown) was a Hungarian rower. He competed in the men's eight event at the 1908 Summer Olympics.

He was a member of the Pannónia Rowing Club, and in 1910 won a bronze medal at the European Championships. He continued rowing competitively until 1920. He was sentenced to six months in prison for high treason in 1921 and sentenced to eight months in prison for deception in 1931.
