= Mart Kuusik =

Estonian rower

Olympic medal record

Men's rowing
Bronze medal – third place	1912 Stockholm	Single sculls

Hugo-Maksimilian "Mart" Kuusik (9 December 1877, Kuokkala, Grand Duchy of Finland – 24 August 1965) was an Estonian rower who competed for the Russian Empire in the 1912 Summer Olympics.

Representing Russia, he won a bronze medal in a single sculls event.

His home-based rowing club was the "Pernauer Ruder Club" located in Pärnu.
