= 1906 European Rowing Championships =

- Venue: Lake Maggiore
- Location: Pallanza, Kingdom of Italy
- Dates: 9 September 1906

The 1906 European Rowing Championships were rowing championships held in the Italian commune of Pallanza on Lake Maggiore on 9 September. The competition was for men only and they competed in five boat classes (M1x, M2x, M2+, M4+, M8+).

== Medal summary ==
Event	Gold		Silver		Bronze	
Event	Country & rowers	Time	Country & rowers	Time	Country & rowers	Time
M1x	France; Gaston Delaplane		Italy; Giovanni Brunialti		Belgium; Theodore Conrades	
M2x	Belgium; Theodore Conrades; Xavier Crombet		Italy; Gianpietro Filippi; Costante Scalero		Switzerland; Alfred Sydler; Emmanuel de Trey	
M2+	Italy; Ercole Olgeni; Scipione Del Giudice; Giuseppe Mion (cox)		Belgium; Guillaume Visser; Urbain Molmans; Rodolphe Colpaert (cox)		(Note: The source does not list further medallists.)	
M4+	Belgium; Guillaume Visser; Polydore De Geyter; Alphonse Van Roy; Urbain Molmans; Rodolphe Colpaert (cox)		Italy; Giuseppe Sinigaglia; Annibale Beretta; Ettore Luciani; Orlando Pontiggia; T. Quadrio (cox)		France; Georges Richard; Caffet; Ch. Rueguera; R. Paul; Raymond Celestin (cox)	
M8+	Belgium; Rodolphe Poma; Oscar Dessomville; Marcel Van Crombrugge; Max Orban; Rémy Orban; François Vergucht; Marcel Morimont; Armand Larocque; Raphael van der Waeren (cox)		France; Charles Delaporte; Fabio Orlandini; Gaston Delaplane; Marcel Monniot; Malcolm Brown; Maurice Henon; Charles Roquebert; Marcel Frébourg		Italy; Archimede de Gregori; Alberto del Nunzio; Giovanni Brunialti; Alfredo Tuzi; Armando Garroni; Guido de Cupis; Ettore Manzolini; Giuseppe Aluffi	
