= Kurt Hoffmann (rower) =

German rower (1890–1976)

Personal information
- Born: Kurt Georg Hoffmann; 12 November 1890 Hamburg, Germany
- Died: 1976

Sport
- Sport: Rowing
- Club: Mainzer RV von 1878
Medal record
Men's rowing
Representing Germany
European Rowing Championships
Gold medal – first place	1913 Ghent	Eight

Kurt Georg Hoffmann (12 November 1890 – 1976) was a German rower. He competed at the 1912 Summer Olympics in Stockholm with the men's single sculls where he was eliminated in round one.
