= Max Orban =

Belgian rower

Personal information
- Born: Adrien Eugène Joseph Max Orban; 22 July 1881 Herve, Belgium
- Died: 23 May 1969 (aged 87)
- Relatives: Rémy Orban (brother)

Sport
- Sport: Rowing
- Club: Royal Club Nautique de Gand
Medal record
Men's rowing
Representing Belgium
Intercalated Games
Silver medal – second place	1906 Athens	Coxed pair 1 mile
European Rowing Championships
Gold medal – first place	1906 Pallanza	Eight

Adrien Eugène Joseph Max Orban (22 July 1881 – 23 May 1969) was a Belgian rower. He competed at the 1906 Intercalated Games in Athens with the men's coxed pair (1 mile) teamed up with his brother Rémy where they won silver.
