= 1907 European Rowing Championships =

- Venue: Rhine
- Location: Strasbourg or Kehl, German Empire
- Dates: ? August

The 1907 European Rowing Championships were rowing championships held on the Rhine. Generally referred to as being held in Strasbourg, the International Rowing Federation website implies that the championships were based in Kehl on the opposite side of the Rhine to Strasbourg. Either way, both towns were at the time part of the German Empire. The competition was for men only and they competed in five boat classes (M1x, M2x, M2+, M4+, M8+).

== Medal summary ==
| Event | Gold | | Silver | | Bronze | |
|---|---|---|---|---|---|---|
| Event | Country & rowers | Time | Country & rowers | Time | Country & rowers | Time |
| M1x | France; Gaston Delaplane | | Belgium; Jozef Hermans | | Italy; Erminio Dones | |
| M2x | Italy; Emilio Sacchini; Erminio Dones | | Belgium; Daniël Clarembaux; Jozef Hermans | | Alsace-Lorraine (Note: The source does not list the names of the team members.) | |
| M2+ | Belgium; Guillaume Visser; Urbain Molmans; Rodolphe Colpaert (cox) | | Italy; Giuseppe Sinigaglia; Annibale Beretta; Cetti (cox) | | Alsace-Lorraine (Note: The source does not list the names of the team members.) | |
| M4+ | Belgium; Guillaume Visser; Alphonse van Roy; Rodolphe Meyvaert; Urbain Molmans; Rodolphe Colpaert (cox) | | Italy (Note: The team was from Battellieri Cristoforo Colombo.); Ettore Sansoni; Mario Albertini; Giacomo Bellinzoni; Corrado Malaspina | | Italy (Note: The source does not list the names of the team members.) | |
| M8+ | Belgium; Rodolphe Poma; Oscar Dessomville; Polydore Veirman; François Vergucht; Georges Mys; Stanislas Kowalski; Marcel Morimont; Oscar Taelman; Raphael van der Waeren (cox) | | Italy; Giovanni Brunialti; Alberto del Nunzio; Archimede de Gregori; Alfredo Tuzi; Armando Garroni; Guido de Cupis; Carlo Gigliesi; Alfonso Serventi | | France (Note: The source does not list the names of the team members.) | |
