= Walter Schoeller =

Swiss athlete (1889-1979)

Personal information
- Born: 12 May 1889
- Died: 16 May 1979 (aged 90)

Sport
- Sport: Rowing, tennis, football, field hockey
- Club: Grasshopper Club Zürich
Medal record
Men's rowing
Representing Switzerland
European Rowing Championships
Silver medal – second place	1911 Como	Eight
Gold medal – first place	1913 Ghent	Coxed four

Walter Schoeller (12 May 1889 – 16 May 1979) was a Swiss athlete best known for his time with Grasshopper Club Zürich.

== Early life ==
Schoeller was a member of the prominent Schoeller family.

== Career ==
His performance led Grasshopper to national titles in rowing (1912 and 1913), tennis (1918 and 1922), football (1921) and field hockey (1926 and 1927), and earning him the nickname "Mister GC".

In 1934, Schoeller secured Hardturm Stadium for use by Grasshopper, and it remains their home ground today.

After 42 years of service to the club, Schoeller was named Honorary President in 1976.
