= Ferenc Kirchknopf =

Hungarian rower

Personal information
- Born: 9 June 1878 Budapest, Hungary
- Died: 1 March 1949 (aged 70) Mád, Hungary
- Weight: 74 kg (163 lb)

Sport
- Sport: Rowing
- Club: Pannónia Evezős Egylet
Medal record
Men's rowing
Representing Hungary
European Rowing Championships
Bronze medal – third place	1910 Ostend	Eight
Silver medal – second place	1921 Amsterdam	Eight
Bronze medal – third place	1922 Barcelona	Eight

Ferenc Kirchknopf (9 June 1878 – 1 March 1949) was a Hungarian rower. He competed at the 1908 Summer Olympics in London with the men's eight where they were eliminated in round one.
