= Jozef Hermans =

Belgian rower

Personal information
- Born: 31 May 1885
- Died: 5 November 1930 (aged 45)
- Weight: 67 kg (148 lb)

Sport
- Sport: Rowing
- Club: CRB, Bruxelles
Medal record
Men's rowing
Representing Belgium
European Rowing Championships
Silver medal – second place	1907 Strasbourg	Single scull
Silver medal – second place	1907 Strasbourg	Double scull
Gold medal – first place	1908 Lucerne	Double scull
Bronze medal – third place	1909 Paris	Single scull
Bronze medal – third place	1911 Como	Double scull
Silver medal – second place	1920 Mâcon	Eight

Jozef Hermans (31 May 1885 – 5 November 1930) was a Belgian rower. He competed at the 1908 Summer Olympics in London with the men's single sculls where he was eliminated in the quarter-final. He competed at the 1920 Summer Olympics in Antwerp with the men's eight where they were eliminated in round one.
