= 1904 European Rowing Championships =

- Venue: Seine
- Location: Courbevoie, Paris, France
- Dates: ? August

The 1904 European Rowing Championships were rowing championships held in Courbevoie, a suburb of Paris, on the Seine on a day in the middle of August. The competition was for men only and they competed in five boat classes (M1x, M2x, M2+, M4+, M8+). The 1904 Summer Olympics had been held in St. Louis, United States, just two weeks prior but no European rowers had attended (apart from auxiliary events that are not considered Olympic events).

== Medal summary ==
Event	Gold		Silver		Bronze	
Event	Country & rowers	Time	Country & rowers	Time	Country & rowers	Time
M1x	Switzerland; Louis von Moos		Alsace-Lorraine; Henri Barbenés		(Note: The source does not list the bronze medal winner.)	
M2x	France; Carlos Deltour; Antoine Védrenne		Belgium; Daniël Clarembaux; Xavier Crombet		Switzerland; Albert von Moos; Louis von Moos	
M2+	France; Beurrier; Émile Lejeune		Belgium; Guillaume Visser; Urbain Molmans; Rodolphe Colpaert (cox)		Italy; Augusto Barbati; Luigi Stolte; Guasco (cox)	
M4+	Belgium; Guillaume Visser; Urbain Molmans; Victor Van Acker; Ernest Tralbaut; Rodolphe Colpaert (cox)		France (Note: The source does not list the names of the team members.)		Italy; Enrico Capelli; Ermano Borghi; Costante Brambilla; Antonio Maganza; Guasco (cox)	
M8+	Belgium; Guillaume Visser; Urbain Molmans; Julien Lauwers; Ernest Tralbaut; Alphonse Van Roy; Hector Deprume; Victor Van Acker; Polydor De Geyter; Rodolphe Colpaert (cox)		France (Note: The source does not list the names of the team members.)		Italy; Carlo Caproni; Mario Bessignano; Uberto Cagnassi; Giorgio Gianolio; Virgilio Forni; Francesco Rossi; Aldo Marchetti; Antonio Colli; Guasco (cox)	
