= François Vergucht =

Belgian rower (1885–1944)

Personal information
- Born: François Pierre Vergucht; 30 December 1885 Saint-Josse-ten-Noode, Belgium
- Died: 23 June 1944 (aged 58) Ghent, German-occupied Belgium
- Weight: 73 kg (161 lb)

Sport
- Sport: Rowing
- Club: Royal Club Nautique de Gand
Medal record
Men's rowing
Representing Belgium
Olympic Games
Silver medal – second place	1908 London	Eight
European Rowing Championships
Gold medal – first place	1906 Pallanza	Eight
Gold medal – first place	1907 Strasbourg	Eight
Gold medal – first place	1908 Lucerne	Eight

François Vergucht (30 December 1885 – 23 June 1944) was a Belgian rower who won a silver medal in men's eight at the 1908 Summer Olympics.
