= Oscar Van Den Bossche =

Belgian rower

Personal information
- Born: 21 July 1888 Ghent, Belgium
- Died: 27 April 1951 (aged 62) Ghent, Belgium

Sport
- Sport: Rowing
- Club: KRSG, Gent
Medal record
Men's rowing
Representing Belgium
European Rowing Championships
Gold medal – first place	1910 Ostend	Eight
Silver medal – second place	1910 Ostend	Coxed four
Bronze medal – third place	1920 Mâcon	Coxed pair

Oscar Van Den Bossche (21 July 1888 – 27 April 1951) was a Belgian rower. He competed at the 1920 Summer Olympics in Antwerp with the men's coxed pair where he together with his brother Georges was eliminated in round one.
