= József Mészáros (rower) =

Hungarian rower

Personal information
- Nationality: Hungarian
- Born: 27 September 1884; Budapest, Austria-Hungary
- Died: 19 August 1956 (aged 71)

Sport
- Sport: Rowing

József Mészáros (27 September 1884 – 19 August 1956) was a Hungarian rower. He competed in the men's single sculls event at the 1912 Summer Olympics.
