= Enrico Bruna =

Italian rower (1880–1921)

Personal information
- Born: 21 November 1880 Venice, Italy
- Died: 7 February 1921 (aged 40) Venice, Italy

Sport
- Sport: Rowing
- Club: Bucintoro Venezia
Medal record
Men's rowing
Representing Italy
Intercalated Games
Gold medal – first place	1906 Athens	Coxed pair (1000 m)
Gold medal – first place	1906 Athens	Coxed pair (1 mile)
Gold medal – first place	1906 Athens	Coxed four
European Rowing Championships
Bronze medal – third place	1910 Ostend	Single scull
Silver medal – second place	1910 Ostend	Double scull
Silver medal – second place	1910 Ostend	Eight
Gold medal – first place	1911 Como	Coxed pair
Inter-Allied Games
Gold medal – first place	1919 Paris	Coxed four

Enrico Bruna (21 November 1880 – 7 February 1921) was an Italian rower.

Bruna was born in 1880 in Venice. He competed at the 1906 Intercalated Games (also known as the 1906 Olympic Games) in Athens where he won three rowing gold medals: in the coxed pair event over 1 km, in the same boat class over 1 mile, and in the coxed four. After World War I, he competed in the men's coxed four at the Inter-Allied Games outside Paris and won gold. He died two years later in Venice aged 40.
