= Tullio Camillotti =

Italian weightlifter

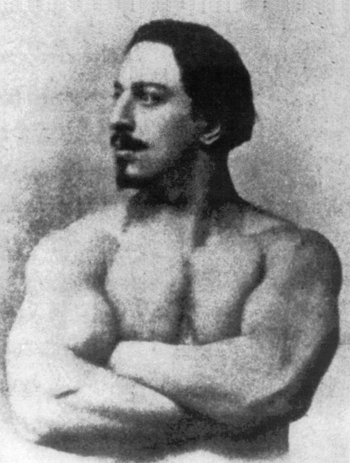

Personal information
- Born: 29 January 1880 Sacile, Italy
- Died: 21 February 1958 (aged 78) Sacile, Italy
- Education: University of Padua
- Height: 1.75 m (5 ft 9 in)
- Weight: 98 kg (216 lb)

Sport
- Sport: Weightlifting
- Club: Juventus, Trieste
Medal record
Representing Italy
Olympic Games
Silver medal – second place	1906 Athens	One hand lift

Tullio Camillotti (29 January 1880 – 21 February 1958) was a heavyweight Italian weightlifter who competed at the 1906 Intercalated Games. He won a silver medal in the one hand lift and finished seventh in the two hand lift. After graduating in law from the University of Padua he retired from competitions.
