= Gabriel Poix =

French rower (1888–1946)

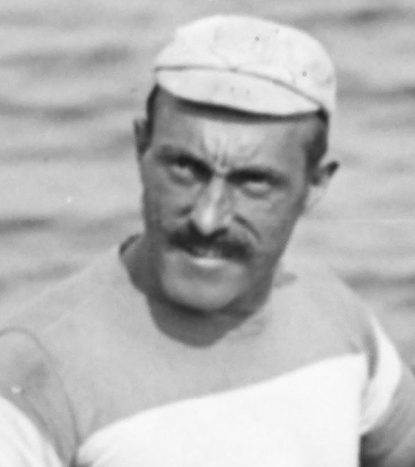
- Poix in 1920

Personal information
- Born: Gabriel Augustin Poix; 8 November 1888 Paris, France
- Died: 23 January 1946 (aged 57) Nogent-sur-Marne, France

Sport
- Sport: Rowing
- Club: Société Nautique de la Marne, Joinville-le-Pont
Medal record
Men's rowing
Representing France
Olympic Games
Silver medal – second place	1920 Antwerp	Coxed pair
European Rowing Championships
Gold medal – first place	1913 Ghent	Coxed pair
Gold medal – first place	1920 Mâcon	Coxed pair

Gabriel Augustin Poix (8 November 1888 – 23 January 1946) was a French rower who competed in the 1912 Summer Olympics and in the 1920 Summer Olympics.

In 1912, he was the strokeman of the French boat Société Nautique de Bayonne which was eliminated in the first round of the coxed four (inriggers) competition. Eight years later, he won the silver medal as a member of the French boat in the coxed pair event.
