= Alfred Heinrich (rower) =

Austrian rower

Personal information
- Nationality: Austrian
- Born: 10 February 1880; Vienna, Austria-Hungary

Sport
- Sport: Rowing

Alfred Heinrich (born 10 February 1880, date of death unknown) was an Austrian rower.

== Olympics career ==
He competed in the men's single sculls event at the 1912 Summer Olympics.
