= Ivan Schweizer =

Czechoslovak rower

Personal information
- Born: 5 September 1884
- Died: unknown

Sport
- Sport: Rowing
Medal record
Men's rowing
Representing Czechoslovakia
European Rowing Championships
Bronze medal – third place	1923 Como	Eight

Ivan Schweizer (5 September 1884 – ?) was a Czechoslovak rower. He competed at the 1920 Summer Olympics in Antwerp with the men's eight where they were eliminated in round one.
