= Ercole Olgeni =

Italian rower

Personal information
- Born: 11 December 1883 Venice, Italy
- Died: 14 July 1947 (aged 63) Venice, Italy

Sport
- Sport: Rowing
- Club: Querini Venezia; Bucintoro Venezia
Medal record
Men's rowing
Representing Italy
Olympic Games
Gold medal – first place	1920 Antwerp	Coxed pair
Silver medal – second place	1924 Paris	Coxed pair
European Rowing Championships
Silver medal – second place	1905 Ghent	Coxed four
Gold medal – first place	1906 Pallanza	Coxed pair
Gold medal – first place	1908 Lucerne	Coxed four
Silver medal – second place	1908 Lucerne	Coxed pair
Silver medal – second place	1910 Ostend	Double scull
Silver medal – second place	1910 Ostend	Eight
Gold medal – first place	1911 Como	Coxed pair
Bronze medal – third place	1924 Zürich	Coxed pair

Ercole Olgeni (11 December 1883 – 14 July 1947) was an Italian rower, born in Venice, who competed in the 1920 Summer Olympics and in the 1924 Summer Olympics.

In 1920 he won the gold medal as crew member of the Italian boat in the coxed pair event. Four years later he won the silver medal with the Italian boat in the same event.
