= Guillaume Visser =

Belgian rower

Personal information
- Born: 20 April 1880 Antwerp, Belgium
- Died: April 1952

Sport
- Sport: Rowing
- Club: KRSG, Gent
Medal record
Men's rowing
Representing Belgium
European Rowing Championships
Gold medal – first place	1903 Venice	Coxed pair
Gold medal – first place	1903 Venice	Coxed four
Gold medal – first place	1903 Venice	Eight
Silver medal – second place	1904 Paris	Coxed pair
Gold medal – first place	1904 Paris	Coxed four
Gold medal – first place	1904 Paris	Eight
Gold medal – first place	1905 Ghent	Coxed pair
Gold medal – first place	1905 Ghent	Coxed four
Silver medal – second place	1905 Ghent	Eight
Silver medal – second place	1906 Pallanza	Coxed pair
Gold medal – first place	1906 Pallanza	Coxed four
Gold medal – first place	1907 Strasbourg	Coxed pair
Gold medal – first place	1907 Strasbourg	Coxed four
Gold medal – first place	1908 Lucerne	Coxed pair
Gold medal – first place	1910 Ostend	Coxed pair
Silver medal – second place	1910 Ostend	Coxed four
Gold medal – first place	1910 Ostend	Eight
Bronze medal – third place	1911 Como	Coxed pair
Silver medal – second place	1912 Geneva	Coxed four

Guillaume Visser (20 April 1880 – April 1952) was a Belgian rower. He competed at the 1912 Summer Olympics in Stockholm with the men's coxed four where they were eliminated in the quarter-finals. Over a ten-year period, he won 19 medals at European Championships, including 13 gold medals.
