= Mario Albertini =

Italian swimmer and rower

Personal information
- Born: 11 March 1885 Pavia, Italy
- Died: 17 August 1957 (aged 72)

Sport
- Sport: Swimming; Rowing
- Club: Rari Nantes Pavia, Pavia (swimming); Battellieri Cristoforo Colombo (rowing)
Medal record
Men's rowing
Representing Italy
European Rowing Championships
Silver medal – second place	1907 Strasbourg	Coxed four

Mario Albertini (11 March 1885 – 17 August 1957) was an Italian swimmer and rower.

Albertini was born in 1885 in Pavia, Italy. He swam for Rari Nantes Pavia and won nine Italian national titles between 1902 and 1906. He competed at the 1906 Intercalated Games in Athens. In the 100 m freestyle, he was eliminated in the heats. In the 1 mile freestyle, he did not finish his heat.

He rowed for Battellieri Cristoforo Colombo and won a silver medal in the coxed four at the 1907 European Rowing Championships in Strasbourg.
