= Jan Šourek =

Czech rower

Personal information
- Nationality: Czech
- Born: 2 September 1887; Plavy u Semil, Austria-Hungary

Sport
- Sport: Rowing

Jan Šourek (born 2 September 1887, date of death unknown) was a Czech rower. He competed in the men's single sculls event at the 1912 Summer Olympics, representing Bohemia.
