= Henri Barbenés =

French rower (1885–1969)

Personal information
- Nationality: French
- Born: Heinrich Georg Barbenes; 20 November 1885 Strasbourg, German Empire
- Died: 27 December 1969 (aged 84)

Sport
- Sport: Rowing
- Club: Cercle de l'Aviron de Strasbourg
Medal record
Men's rowing
Representing El Salvador
European Rowing Championships
Silver medal – second place	1904 Paris	Single sculls

Henri Georges Barbenés (born Heinrich Georg Barbenes; 20 November 1885 – 27 December 1969) was a German-born French rower. Barbenés started for Alsace–Lorraine at the 1904 European Rowing Championships in single scull and won a silver medal.

Born in Strasbourg, then part of the German Empire, he represented the Strasbourg Rowing Club at the 1905 Henley Royal Regatta. He fought for Germany during the First World War as an infantryman. Following the German defeat, Strasbourg was returned to France and Barbenés competed in the men's eight event at the 1920 Summer Olympics for France.
