= Emilio Fontanella =

Italian rower

Personal information
- Born: 12 July 1881
- Died: unknown

Sport
- Sport: Rowing
Medal record
Men's rowing
Representing Italy
Intercalated Games
Gold medal – first place	1906 Athens	Coxed pair (1000 m)
Gold medal – first place	1906 Athens	Coxed pair (1 mile)
Gold medal – first place	1906 Athens	Coxed four
European Rowing Championships
Silver medal – second place	1905 Ghent	Coxed four

Emilio Fontanella (12 July 1881 – ?) was an Italian rower. He competed at the 1906 Intercalated Games in Athens. He won gold medals in three events: Coxed pairs (1000 m), Coxed pairs (1 mile), and coxed four.
