= Giuseppe Sinigaglia =

Italian rower

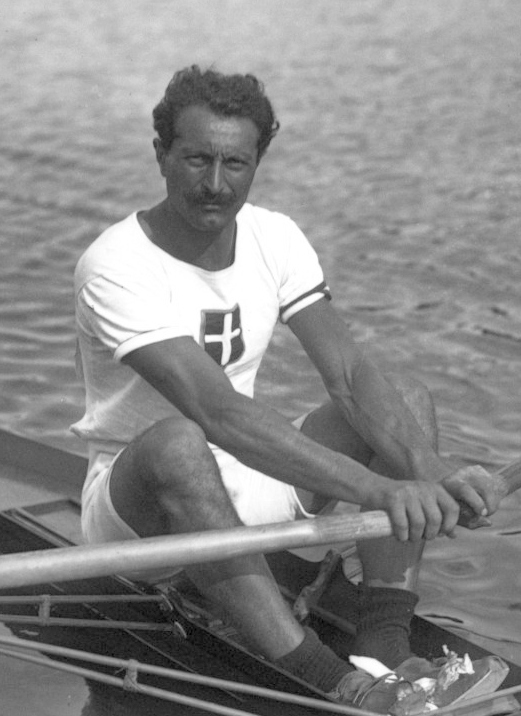
- Giuseppe Sinigaglia in 1913

Personal information
- Born: 28 January 1884 Como, Italy
- Died: 10 August 1916 (aged 32) San Vito al Torre, Italy

Sport
- Sport: Rowing
- Club: Lario Como
Medal record
Representing Italy
European Rowing Championships
Gold medal – first place	1911 Como	Single sculls
Gold medal – first place	1911 Como	Double sculls
Silver medal – second place	1906 Pallanza	Coxed four
Silver medal – second place	1907 Strasbourg	Coxed pair
Silver medal – second place	1912 Geneva	Single sculls
Silver medal – second place	1912 Geneva	Eight
Silver medal – second place	1913 Ghent	Double sculls
Bronze medal – third place	1913 Ghent	Eight

Giuseppe Sinigaglia (28 January 1884 – 10 August 1916) was an Italian rower. He won the Diamond Challenge Sculls at Henley Royal Regatta and eight medals at the European championships of 1906–1913 in various rowing events. He died of wounds during World War I.

== Biography ==
Sinigaglia was born at Como as the son of Antonio Sinigaglia and his wife Antoinette. His parents ran a restaurant, but his father emigrated to South America and never returned. He was educated at Gaius Plinius Technical Institute and was a member of Pool Comense 1872 until 1903 when he was expelled for indiscipline. He then joined Canottieri Lario. In 1907 he won the Italian championship in a coxed pair. In 1911 he was Italian and European Champion in the single scull and in the double scull with Teodoro Mariani. In 1914, Sinigaglia won the Diamond Challenge Sculls at Henley beating Colin Stuart in the final.

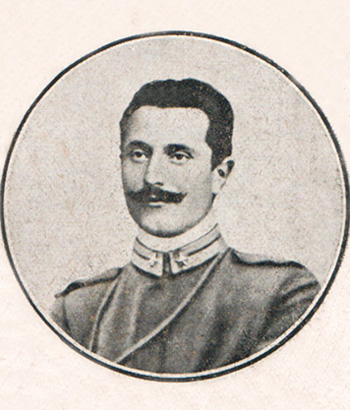
Sinigaglia as officer of the Granatieri di Sardegna

After the outbreak of World War I, Sinigaglia volunteered into the Royal Italian Army and was assigned to the 2nd Regiment Granatieri di Sardegna Mechanized Brigade. After a period of training he took part in the offensive against Monte Sabotino and Monte Podgora. In 1916 he was promoted to lieutenant and fought in the Battle of Asiago. He later took part in the Sixth Battle of the Isonzo at Monte San Michele and Gorizia. On 9 August 1916, Sinigaglia led his men in an attack on Hill 4 of Monte San Michele. He was hit by Austrian fire and was transported the hospital at San Vito al Torre where he died the next day.

Sinigaglia was awarded the Silver Medal of Military Valor. The stadium in Como was named in his honour.

== Bibliography ==
- Maurizio Casarola, Lo chiamavano Sina, Nordpress Edizioni, 2007.
- Mario Bazzi, Il gigante buono, Tipografia Commerciale Prini & C., Como.
