= Gaston Delaplane =

French cyclist and rower

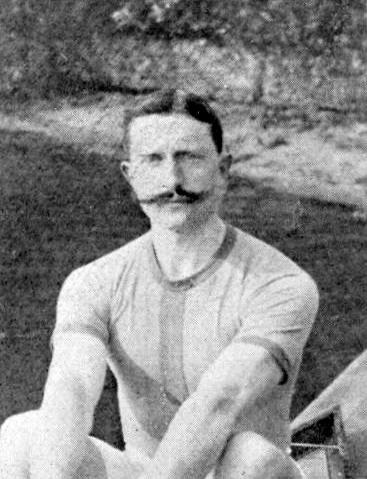
- Gaston Delaplane in 1911

Personal information
- Born: 6 March 1882 Le Havre, France
- Died: 12 December 1977 (aged 95) Nice, France

Cycling career
- Sport: Cycling
Medal record
Representing France
Men's rowing
Intercalated Games
Gold medal – first place	Athens 1906	Single sculls
Silver medal – second place	Athens 1906	Coxed fours
Bronze medal – third place	Athens 1906	Coxed pair (1km)
European Rowing Championships
Gold medal – first place	1906 Pallanza	Single sculls
Silver medal – second place	1906 Pallanza	Eight
Gold medal – first place	1907 Strasbourg	Single sculls
Gold medal – first place	1908 Lucerne	Single sculls
Silver medal – second place	1909 Paris	Single sculls
Silver medal – second place	1909 Paris	Double sculls
Gold medal – first place	1909 Paris	Eight
Gold medal – first place	1910 Ostend	Single sculls
Gold medal – first place	1910 Ostend	Double sculls
Silver medal – second place	1911 Como	Double sculls
Bronze medal – third place	1911 Como	Eight

Gaston Delaplane (6 March 1882 – 12 December 1977) was a French rower and cyclist. He won three medals in rowing at the 1906 Intercalated Games and competed in three cycling events at the 1908 Summer Olympics.
