= Giuseppe Mion =

Austrian ice hockey player

Personal information
- Born: 9 April 1959 (age 67) Villach, Austria

Sport
- Sport: Ice hockey

Giuseppe Mion (born 9 April 1959) is an Austrian ice hockey player. He competed in the men's tournament at the 1984 Winter Olympics.
