= Great Britain at the 1908 Summer Olympics =

- Flag of the United Kingdom
- IOC code: GBR
- NOC: British Olympic Association

in London
- Competitors: 676 in 24 sports
- Flag bearer: Kynaston Studd
- Medals Ranked 1st: Gold 56 Silver 51 Bronze 39 Total 146

Summer Olympics appearances (overview)
- 1896; 1900; 1904; 1908; 1912; 1920; 1924; 1928; 1932; 1936; 1948; 1952; 1956; 1960; 1964; 1968; 1972; 1976; 1980; 1984; 1988; 1992; 1996; 2000; 2004; 2008; 2012; 2016; 2020; 2024

Other related appearances
- 1906 Intercalated Games

Great Britain, represented by the British Olympic Association (BOA), competed as the host nation of the 1908 Summer Olympics in London. The British Olympic Association was the National Olympic Committee responsible for organising the United Kingdom's representation. At the time British and Irish athletes competed under the team name "United Kingdom". The British team comprised 676 competitors.

It was the fourth appearance of the country, which has not missed any of the Summer Olympic Games. The country finished in the Olympic table in first place for the first and only time in its history. The Men's field hockey on the 31st of October is the last time that Great Britain swept the medal podium at an Olympics, as of 2022.

== Medallists ==
Medal	Name	Sport	Event	Date
Gold	William Dod	Archery	Men's double York round	July 18
Gold	Queenie Newall	Archery	Women's double National round	July 18
Gold	Wyndham Halswelle	Athletics	Men's 400 m	July 23
Gold	Emil Voigt	Athletics	Men's 5 miles	July 18
Gold	Arthur Russell	Athletics	Men's 3200 m steeplechase	July 18
Gold	William Coales, Joe Deakin, Arthur Robertson	Athletics	Men's 3 miles team race	July 15
Gold	George Larner	Athletics	Men's 3500 m walk	July 14
Gold	George Larner	Athletics	Men's 10 miles walk	July 17
Gold	Tim Ahearne	Athletics	Men's triple jump	July 25
Gold	Henry Thomas	Boxing	Bantamweight	October 27
Gold	Richard Gunn	Boxing	Featherweight	October 27
Gold	Frederick Grace	Boxing	Lightweight	October 27
Gold	Johnny Douglas	Boxing	Middleweight	October 27
Gold	Albert Oldman	Boxing	Heavyweight	October 27
Gold	Victor Johnson	Cycling	Men's 660 yd	July 15
Gold	Benjamin Jones	Cycling	Men's 5000 m	July 18
Gold	Clarence Kingsbury	Cycling	Men's 20 km	July 14
Gold	Charles Henry Bartlett	Cycling	Men's 100 km	July 18
Gold	Benjamin Jones, Clarence Kingsbury, Leonard Meredith, Ernest Payne	Cycling	Men's team pursuit	July 17
Gold	Madge Syers	Figure skating	Ladies' singles	October 29
Gold	Great Britain men's Olympic football team: Horace Bailey; George Barlow; Albert Bell; Arthur Berry; Ronald Brebner; Frederick Chapman; Walter Corbett; W. Crabtree; Walter Daffern; Harold Hardman; Robert Hawkes; Kenneth Hunt; Thomas Porter; Clyde Purnell; Albert Scothern; Herbert Smith; Harold Stapley; Vivian Woodward	Football		October 24
Gold	England national field hockey team: Louis Baillon; Harry Freeman; Eric Green; Gerald Logan; Alan Noble; Edgar Page; Reggie Pridmore; Percy Rees; John Yate Robinson; Stanley Shoveller; Harvey Wood	Field hockey		October 31
Gold	Charles Darley Miller, George Arthur Miller, Patteson Womersley Nickalls, Herbert Haydon Wilson	Polo		June 21
Gold	Evan Noel	Rackets	Men's singles	April 29
Gold	John Jacob Astor, Vane Pennell	Rackets	Men's doubles	May 1
Gold	Harry Blackstaffe	Rowing	Men's single sculls	July 31
Gold	John Fenning, Gordon Thomson	Rowing	Men's coxless pair	July 31
Gold	Collier Cudmore, James Angus Gillan, Duncan Mackinnon, John Somers-Smith	Rowing	Men's coxless four	July 31
Gold	Henry Bucknall, Charles Burnell, Raymond Etherington-Smith, Albert Gladstone, Banner Johnstone, Frederick Septimus Kelly, Gilchrist Maclagan, Guy Nickalls, Ronald Sanderson	Rowing	Men's eight	July 31
Gold	Charles Crichton, Gilbert Laws, Thomas McMeekin	Sailing	6 m class	July 29
Gold	Norman Bingley, Richard Dixon, Charles Rivett-Carnac, Frances Rivett-Carnac	Sailing	7 m class	July 29
Gold	Charles Campbell, Blair Cochrane, John Rhodes, Henry Sutton, Arthur Wood	Sailing	8 m class	July 29
Gold	T. C. Glen Coats (helmsman), J. H. Downes (mate), J. S. Aspin, John Buchanan, J. C. Bunten, A. D. Downes, David Dunlop, John Mackenzie, Albert Martin, Gerald Tait	Sailing	12 m class	July 12
Gold	Joshua Millner	Shooting	Men's 1000 yd free rifle	July 9
Gold	Arthur Carnell	Shooting	Men's stationary target small-bore rifle	July 11
Gold	John Fleming	Shooting	Men's moving target small-bore rifle	July 11
Gold	William Styles	Shooting	Men's disappearing target small-bore rifle	July 11
Gold	Edward Amoore, Harold Humby, Maurice Matthews, William Pimm	Shooting	Men's team small-bore rifle	July 11
Gold	Peter Easte, Alexander Maunder, Frederic Moore, Charles Palmer, John Pike, John Postans	Shooting	Men's trap, team	July 11
Gold	Henry Taylor	Swimming	Men's 400 m freestyle	July 16
Gold	Henry Taylor	Swimming	Men's 1500 m freestyle	July 25
Gold	Frederick Holman	Swimming	Men's 200 m breaststroke	July 18
Gold	John Derbyshire, William Foster, Paul Radmilovic, Henry Taylor	Swimming	Men's 4 × 200 m freestyle relay	July 24
Gold	Josiah Ritchie	Tennis	Men's singles	July 11
Gold	Reginald Doherty, George Hillyard	Tennis	Men's doubles	July 11
Gold	Arthur Gore	Tennis	Men's indoor singles	July 11
Gold	Arthur Gore, Herbert Roper Barrett	Tennis	Men's indoor doubles	July 9
Gold	Dorothea Douglass	Tennis	Women's singles	July 11
Gold	Gwendoline Eastlake-Smith	Tennis	Women's indoor singles	July 11
Gold	Edward Barrett, John Duke, Frederick Goodfellow, Frederick Humphreys, William Hirons, Albert Ireton, Frederick Merriman, Edwin Mills, John James Shepherd	Tug of war		July 18
Gold	John Field-Richards, Bernard Boverton Redwood, Isaac Thomas Thornycroft	Water motorsports	Class B	August 28
Gold	John Field-Richards, Bernard Boverton Redwood, Isaac Thomas Thornycroft	Water motorsports	Class C	August 29
Gold	Great Britain men's national water polo team: George Cornet; Charles Forsyth; George Nevinson; Paulo Radmilovic; Charles Sydney Smith; Thomas Thould; George Wilkinson	Water polo		July 22
Gold	George de Relwyskow	Wrestling	Men's freestyle lightweight	July 24
Gold	Stanley Bacon	Wrestling	Men's freestyle middleweight	July 22
Gold	Con O'Kelly	Wrestling	Men's freestyle heavyweight	July 23
Silver	Reginald Brooks-King	Archery	Men's double York round	July 18
Silver	Lottie Dod	Archery	Women's double National round	July 18
Silver	Harold A. Wilson	Athletics	Men's 1500 m	July 14
Silver	Edward Owen	Athletics	Men's 5 miles	July 18
Silver	Arthur Robertson	Athletics	Men's 3200 m steeplechase	July 18
Silver	Ernest Webb	Athletics	Men's 3500 m walk	July 14
Silver	Ernest Webb	Athletics	Men's 10 miles walk	July 17
Silver	Con Leahy	Athletics	Men's high jump	July 21
Silver	Denis Horgan	Athletics	Men's shot put	July 16
Silver	John Condon	Boxing	Bantamweight	October 27
Silver	Charles Morris	Boxing	Featherweight	October 27
Silver	Frederick Spiller	Boxing	Lightweight	October 27
Silver	Sydney Evans	Boxing	Heavyweight	October 27
Silver	Benjamin Jones	Cycling	Men's 20 km	July 14
Silver	Charles Denny	Cycling	Men's 100 km	July 18
Silver	Frederick Hamlin, Thomas Johnson	Cycling	Men's tandem	July 15
Silver	Leaf Daniell, Cecil Haig, Martin Holt, Robert Montgomerie	Fencing	Men's team épée	October 24
Silver	Arthur Cumming	Figure skating	Men's special figures	October 29
Silver	James H. Johnson, Phyllis Johnson	Figure skating	Pairs	October 29
Silver	Walter Tysall	Gymnastics	Men's all-around	July 15
Silver	Ireland national field hockey team: Edward Allman-Smith; Henry Brown; Walter Campbell; William Graham; Richard Gregg; Edward Holmes; Robert Kennedy; Henry Murphy; Walter Peterson; Charles Power; Frank Robinson	Field hockey		October 31
Silver	Eustace Miles	Jeu de paume		May 23
Silver	Great Britain national lacrosse team: George Alexander; J. Alexander; L. Blockey; George Buckland; Eric Dutton; V. G. Gilbey; S. N. Hayes; Frank S. Johnson; Wilfrid Johnson; Edward Jones; Reginald Martin; Gerald Mason; G. J. Mason; Johnson Parker-Smith; Hubert Ramsey; Charles Scott; H. Shorrocks; Norman Whitley	Lacrosse		October 24
Silver	Walter Buckmaster, Frederick Freake, Walter Jones, John Wodehouse	Polo		June 21
Silver	John Hardress Lloyd, John Paul McCann, Percy O'Reilly, Auston Rotheram	Polo		June 21
Silver	Henry Leaf	Rackets	Men's singles	April 29
Silver	Cecil Browning, Edmund Bury	Rackets	Men's doubles	May 1
Silver	Alexander McCulloch	Rowing	Men's single sculls	July 31
Silver	George Fairbairn, Philip Verdon	Rowing	Men's coxless pair	July 31
Silver	Harold Barker, John Fenning, Philip Filleul, Gordon Thomson	Rowing	Men's coxless four	July 31
Silver	Cornwall rugby union: James Davey; Frederick Dean; John Jackett; Richard Jackett; E. J. Jones; J. T. Jose; A. Lawrey; C. R. Marshall; Barney Solomon; Bert Solomon; Nicholas Tregurtha; John Trevaskis; A. Wilcocks; Thomas Wedge; Arthur Wilson	Rugby union		October 26
Silver	C. MacIver (helmsman), J. G. Kenion (mate), J. M. Adam, James Baxter, W. P. Davidson, J. F. Jellico, T. A. R. Littledale, C. R. MacIver, C. Macleod Robertson, J. F. D. Spence	Sailing	12 m class	July 12
Silver	Arthur Fulton, John Martin, Harcourt Ommundsen, William Padgett, Philip Richardson, Fleetwood Varley	Shooting	Men's military rifle, team	July 11
Silver	Harold Humby	Shooting	Men's stationary target small-bore rifle	July 11
Silver	Maurice Matthews	Shooting	Men's moving target small-bore rifle	July 11
Silver	Harold Hawkins	Shooting	Men's disappearing target small-bore rifle	July 11
Silver	Ted Ranken	Shooting	Men's single-shot running deer	July 9
Silver	Ted Ranken	Shooting	Men's double-shot running deer	July 10
Silver	William Ellicott, William Russell Lane-Joynt, Charles Nix, Ted Ranken	Shooting	Men's team single-shot running deer	July 10
Silver	Thomas Battersby	Swimming	Men's 1500 m freestyle	July 25
Silver	William Robinson	Swimming	Men's 200 m breaststroke	July 18
Silver	James Cecil Parke, Josiah Ritchie	Tennis	Men's doubles	July 11
Silver	George Caridia	Tennis	Men's indoor singles	July 11
Silver	George Caridia, George Simond	Tennis	Men's indoor doubles	July 9
Silver	Dora Boothby	Tennis	Women's singles	July 11
Silver	Alice Greene	Tennis	Women's indoor singles	July 11
Silver	James Clarke, Thomas Butler, Charles Foden, William Greggan, Alexander Kidd, Daniel Lowey, Patrick Philbin, George Smith, Thomas Swindlehurst	Tug of war		July 18
Silver	William J. Press	Wrestling	Men's freestyle bantamweight	July 20
Silver	John Slim	Wrestling	Men's freestyle featherweight	July 22
Silver	William Wood	Wrestling	Men's freestyle lightweight	July 24
Silver	George de Relwyskow	Wrestling	Men's freestyle middleweight	July 22
Bronze	Beatrice Hill-Lowe	Archery	Women's double National round	July 18
Bronze	Norman Hallows	Athletics	Men's 1500 m	July 14
Bronze	Jimmy Tremeer	Athletics	Men's 400 m hurdles	July 22
Bronze	Edward Spencer	Athletics	Men's 10 miles walk	July 17
Bronze	William Webb	Boxing	Bantamweight	October 27
Bronze	Hugh Roddin	Boxing	Featherweight	October 27
Bronze	Harry Johnson	Boxing	Lightweight	October 27
Bronze	William Philo	Boxing	Middleweight	October 27
Bronze	Frederick Parks	Boxing	Heavyweight	October 27
Bronze	Charlie Brooks, Walter Isaacs	Cycling	Men's tandem	July 15
Bronze	Geoffrey Hall-Say	Figure skating	Men's special figures	October 29
Bronze	Dorothy Greenhough-Smith	Figure skating	Ladies' singles	October 29
Bronze	Edgar Syers, Madge Syers	Figure skating	Pairs	October 29
Bronze	Scotland national field hockey team: Alexander Burt; John Burt; Alastair Denniston; Charles Foulkes; Hew Fraser; James Harper-Orr; Ivan Laing; Hugh Neilson; Gordon Orchardson; Norman Stevenson; Hugh Walker	Field hockey		October 31
Bronze	Wales national field hockey team: Frank Connah; Llewellyn Evans; Arthur Law; Robert Lyne; Wilfred Pallott; Frederick Phillips; Edwin Richards; Charles Shepherd; Bertrand Turnbull; Philip Turnbull; James Williams	Field hockey		October 31
Bronze	Neville Bulwer-Lytton	Jeu de paume		May 23
Bronze	John Jacob Astor	Rackets	Men's singles	April 29
Bronze	Henry Brougham	Rackets	Men's singles	April 29
Bronze	Evan Noel, Henry Leaf	Rackets	Men's doubles	May 1
Bronze	Harry Blackstaffe	Rowing	Men's single sculls	July 31
Bronze	Richard Boyle, John Burn, Oswald Carver, Henry Goldsmith, Frank Jerwood, Harold Kitching, Eric Powell, Douglas Stuart, Edward Gordon Williams	Rowing	Men's eight	July 31
Bronze	Alfred Hughes, Frederick Hughes, Philip Hunloke, George Ratsey, William Dudley Ward	Sailing	8 m class	July 29
Bronze	Maurice Blood	Shooting	Men's 1000 yd free rifle	July 9
Bronze	George Barnes	Shooting	Men's stationary target small-bore rifle	July 11
Bronze	William Marsden	Shooting	Men's moving target small-bore rifle	July 11
Bronze	Edward Amoore	Shooting	Men's disappearing target small-bore rifle	July 11
Bronze	Alexander Rogers	Shooting	Men's single-shot running deer	July 9
Bronze	Geoffrey Coles, William Ellicott, Henry Lynch-Staunton, Jesse Wallingford	Shooting	Men's 50 yd free pistol, team	July 11
Bronze	Alexander Maunder	Shooting	Men's trap	July 11
Bronze	John Butt, Henry Creasey, Bob Hutton, William Morris, George Herbert Skinner, George Whitaker	Shooting	Men's trap, team	July 11
Bronze	Herbert Haresnape	Swimming	Men's 100 m backstroke	July 17
Bronze	Wilberforce Eaves	Tennis	Men's singles	July 11
Bronze	Clement Cazalet, Charles P. Dixon	Tennis	Men's doubles	July 11
Bronze	Ruth Winch	Tennis	Women's singles	July 11
Bronze	Walter Chaffe, Joseph Dowler, Ernest Ebbage, Thomas Homewood, Alexander Munro, William Slade, Walter Tammas, T. J. Williams, James Woodget	Tug of war		July 18
Bronze	William McKie	Wrestling	Men's freestyle featherweight	July 22
Bronze	Albert Gingell	Wrestling	Men's freestyle lightweight	July 24
Bronze	Frederick Beck	Wrestling	Men's freestyle middleweight	July 22
Bronze	Edward Barrett	Wrestling	Men's freestyle heavyweight	July 23

== Results by event ==
=== Archery ===
In the archery competition, the British team dominated the two events (one for men, one for women) popular in their country, winning both championships and second places as well as one third place, losing only a single bronze medal to the United States. British women were the only ones to compete in the women's event. Great Britain had 41 archers present, 25 women and 16 men; they totalled 42 entries over all three events held.

Brother and sister William and Lottie Dod took gold and silver medals, Queenie Newall taking the women's gold to become the oldest female gold medallist in Olympic history (a record she holds through the 2004 Summer Olympics), and the only Irish woman present at the 1908 Games won the women's bronze medal.

The British did not do as well in the Continental style, dominated by the French team, with the only Briton taking 12th place. Robert Backhouse, however, shot a score in a friendly demonstration that would have placed him second had he been in actual competition.

Event	Place	Archer	Score
Men's double York round	1st	William Dod	815
Men's double York round	2nd	Reginald Brooks-King	768
Men's double York round	4th	John Penrose	709
Men's double York round	5th	John Bridges	687
Men's double York round	6th	Harold James	652
Men's double York round	7th	Theodore Robinson	647
Men's double York round	8th	Hugh Nesham	643
Men's double York round	9th	John Keyworth	622
Men's double York round	10th	Charles Perry-Keene	543
Men's double York round	11th	Capel Pownall	532
Men's double York round	12th	John Stopford	530
Men's double York round	13th	Robert Backhouse	516
Men's double York round	14th	Robert Heathcote	476
Men's double York round	15th	Geoffrey Cornewall	430
Men's double York round	18th	Charles Coates	413
Men's double York round	21st	R. H. Bagnall-Oakeley	374
Men's Continental style	12th	John Keyworth	190
Women's double National round	1st	Queenie Newall	688
Women's double National round	2nd	Lottie Dod	642
Women's double National round	3rd	Beatrice Hill-Lowe	618
Women's double National round	4th	Jessie Wadworth	605
Women's double National round	5th	G. W. H. Honnywill	587
Women's double National round	6th	S. H. Armitage	582
Women's double National round	7th	V. W. H. Priestley-Foster	553
Women's double National round	8th	Lillian Wilson	534
Women's double National round	9th	Mary Wadworth	522
Women's double National round	10th	M. Boddam-Whetham	510
Women's double National round	11th	Gertrude Appleyard	503
Women's double National round	12th	E. Nott-Bower	503
Women's double National round	13th	Lillias Robertson	500
Women's double National round	14th	Margaret Weedon	498
Women's double National round	15th	Albertine Thackwell	484
Women's double National round	16th	Doris E. Day	483
Women's double National round	17th	K. G. Mudge	465
Women's double National round	18th	Ellen Babington	451
Women's double National round	19th	Christine Cadman	427
Women's double National round	20th	Martina Hyde	419
Women's double National round	21st	Sarah Leonard	410
Women's double National round	22nd	Ina Wood	387
Women's double National round	23rd	Janetta Vance	385
Women's double National round	24th	Emily Rushton	323
Women's double National round	25th	Hilda Williams	316

=== Athletics ===
The British team was the second most successful team in athletics. With 7 first-place finishes, they gathered less than half the championships that the American team did at 16, but still nearly doubled all other teams combined (4 gold medals).

==== Running ====
Event	Place	Athlete	Heats	Semifinals	Final
Men's 100 metres	Semi- finalist	Patrick Roche	11.4 seconds 1st, heat 17	Unknown; 3rd, semifinal 1	Did not advance
Men's 100 metres	Semi- finalist	John W. Morton	11.2 seconds 1st, heat 9	Unknown; 3rd, semifinal 2	Did not advance
Men's 100 metres	Semi- finalist	James P. Stark	11.8 seconds 1st, heat 16	Unknown; 3rd, semifinal 4	Did not advance
Men's 100 metres	Semi- finalist	Robert Duncan	11.4 seconds 1st, heat 7	Unknown; 4th, semifinal 3	Did not advance
Men's 100 metres	Semi- finalist	John George	11.6 seconds 1st, heat 2	Unknown; 4th, semifinal 4	Did not advance
Men's 100 metres	Heats	Meyrick Chapman	11.3 seconds 2nd, heat 10	Did not advance	
Men's 100 metres	Heats	Henry Pankhurst	11.5 seconds 2nd, heat 12	Did not advance	
Men's 100 metres	Heats	Denis Murray	Unknown; 3rd, heat 4	Did not advance	
Men's 100 metres	Heats	Harold Watson	Unknown; 3rd, heat 14	Did not advance	
Men's 100 metres	Heats	William Murray	Unknown; 4th, heat 8	Did not advance	
Men's 100 metres	—	Henry Harmer	Did not finish —, heat 5	Did not advance	
Men's 200 metres	4th	George Hawkins	22.8 seconds 1st, heat 15	22.6 seconds 1st, semifinal 4	22.9 seconds
Men's 200 metres	Semi- finalist	Lionel Reed	23.2 seconds 1st, heat 13	Unknown; 2nd, semifinal 3	Did not advance
Men's 200 metres	Semi- finalist	Patrick Roche	22.8 seconds 1st, heat 3	Unknown; 2nd, semifinal 4	Did not advance
Men's 200 metres	Semi- finalist	John George	23.4 seconds 1st, heat 1	Unknown; 3rd, semifinal 3	Did not advance
Men's 200 metres	Semi- finalist	Samuel Hurdsfield	23.6 seconds 1st, heat 9	Unknown; 4th, semifinal 3	Did not advance
Men's 200 metres	Heats	Robert Duncan	Unknown; 2nd, heat 5	Did not advance	
Men's 200 metres	Heats	John W. Morton	Unknown; 2nd, heat 12	Did not advance	
Men's 200 metres	Heats	Henry Pankhurst	Unknown; 3rd, heat 10	Did not advance	
Men's 200 metres	Heats	James P. Stark	Unknown; 3rd, heat 11	Did not advance	
Men's 400 metres	1st	Wyndham Halswelle	49.4 seconds 1st, heat 15	48.4 seconds (OR); 1st, semifinal 2	50.0 seconds (walkover)
Men's 400 metres	Semi- finalist	Charles Davies	50.4 seconds 1st, heat 12	Unknown; 2nd, semifinal 1	Did not advance
Men's 400 metres	Semi- finalist	Edwin Montague	50.2 seconds 1st, heat 1	Unknown; 2nd, semifinal 2	Did not advance
Men's 400 metres	Semi- finalist	George Nicol	50.8 seconds 1st, heat 5	Unknown; 3rd, semifinal 2	Did not advance
Men's 400 metres	Semi- finalist	Edward Ryle	Walkover; 1st, heat 3	Unknown; 3rd, semifinal 3	Did not advance
Men's 400 metres	Semi- finalist	G. W. Young	52.4 seconds 1st, heat 16	Unknown; 4th, semifinal 1	Did not advance
Men's 400 metres	Heats	Christopher Maude Chavasse	Unknown; 2nd, heat 8	Did not advance	
Men's 400 metres	Heats	Arthur Astley	Unknown; 2nd, heat 9	Did not advance	
Men's 400 metres	Heats	Alan Patterson	Unknown; 2nd, heat 11	Did not advance	
Men's 400 metres	Heats	Robert Robb	Unknown; 2nd, heat 13	Did not advance	
Men's 400 metres	Heats	Noel Godfrey Chavasse	Unknown; 3rd, heat 7	Did not advance	
Men's 800 metres	5th	Theodore Just	None held	1:57.8; 1st, semifinal 6	1:56.4
Men's 800 metres	7-8	Ivo Fairbairn-Crawford	None held	1:57.8; 1st, semifinal 8	Did not finish
Men's 800 metres	Semi- finalist	George Butterfield	None held	Unknown; 2nd, semifinal 1	Did not advance
Men's 800 metres	Semi- finalist	James Lintott	None held	Unknown; 2nd, semifinal 2	Did not advance
Men's 800 metres	Semi- finalist	John Lee	None held	Unknown; 2nd, semifinal 3	Did not advance
Men's 800 metres	Semi- finalist	Arthur Astley	None held	Unknown; 2nd, semifinal 5	Did not advance
Men's 800 metres	Semi- finalist	George Morphy	None held	Unknown; 3rd, semifinal 3	Did not advance
Men's 800 metres	Semi- finalist	Harold Holding	None held	Unknown; 3rd, semifinal 7	Did not advance
Men's 800 metres	—	Frederick Ashford	None held	Did not finish —, semifinal 1	Did not advance
Men's 800 metres	—	L. J. Manogue	None held	Did not finish —, semifinal 4	Did not advance
Men's 1500 metres	2nd	Harold A. Wilson	None held	Unknown; 1st, semifinal 7	4:03.6
Men's 1500 metres	3rd	Norman Hallows	None held	4:03.4 (OR); 1st, semifinal 3	4:04.0
Men's 1500 metres	5th	Ivo Fairbairn-Crawford	None held	Unknown; 1st, semifinal 8	4:07.6
Men's 1500 metres	6th	Joe Deakin	None held	4:13.6; 1st, semifinal 6	4:07.9
Men's 1500 metres	7-8	Ernest Loney	None held	4:08.4; 1st, semifinal 4	Did not finish
Men's 1500 metres	Semi- finalist	George Butterfield	None held	Unknown; 3rd, semifinal 2	Did not advance
Men's 1500 metres	Semi- finalist	John McGough	None held	Unknown; 3rd, semifinal 4	Did not advance
Men's 1500 metres	Semi- finalist	Francis Knott	None held	Unknown; 4th, semifinal 1	Did not advance
Men's 1500 metres	Semi- finalist	John Lee	None held	Unknown; 4th, semifinal 2	Did not advance
Men's 1500 metres	Semi- finalist	Josh Smith	None held	Unknown; 5th, semifinal 1	Did not advance
Men's 110 metre hurdles	Semi- finalist	Eric Hussey	16.8 seconds 1st, heat 11	Unknown; 2nd, semifinal 1	Did not advance
Men's 110 metre hurdles	Semi- finalist	William Knyvett	Walkover; 1st, heat 7	Unknown; 2nd, semifinal 2	Did not advance
Men's 110 metre hurdles	Semi- finalist	Alfred Healey	15.8 seconds 1st, heat 1	Unknown; 2nd, semifinal 3	Did not advance
Men's 110 metre hurdles	Semi- finalist	Cecil Kinahan	16.8 seconds 1st, heat 12	Unknown; 2nd, semifinal 4	Did not advance
Men's 110 metre hurdles	Semi- finalist	Laurence Kiely	Walkover; 1st, heat 4	Unknown; 3rd, semifinal 3	Did not advance
Men's 110 metre hurdles	Semi- finalist	Wallis Walters	17.8 seconds 1st, heat 6	Unknown; 3rd, semifinal 1	Did not advance
Men's 110 metre hurdles	Semi- finalist	Oswald Groenings	16.4 seconds 1st, heat 3	Unknown; 4th, semifinal 1	Did not advance
Men's 110 metre hurdles	Semi- finalist	Tim Ahearne	Walkover; 1st, heat 9	Unknown; 4th, semifinal 3	Did not advance
Men's 110 metre hurdles	Heats	Arthur Halligan	Unknown; 2nd, heat 2	Did not advance	
Men's 110 metre hurdles	Heats	Kenneth Powell	Unknown; 2nd, heat 5	Did not advance	
Men's 110 metre hurdles	Heats	Edward Leader	Unknown; 2nd, heat 13	Did not advance	
Men's 400 metre hurdles	3rd	Jimmy Tremeer	Walkover; 1st, heat 10	1:00.6; 1st, semifinal 4	57.0 seconds
Men's 400 metre hurdles	4th	Leslie Burton	1:00.4; 1st, heat 12	Unknown; 1st, semifinal 3	58.0 seconds
Men's 400 metre hurdles	Semi- finalist	Frederick Harmer	Walkover; 1st, heat 4	Unknown; 2nd, semifinal 3	Did not advance
Men's 400 metre hurdles	Semi- finalist	Wyatt Gould	Walkover; 1st, heat 8	Unknown; 3rd, semifinal 3	Did not advance
Men's 400 metre hurdles	Semi- finalist	Oswald Groenings	Walkover; 1st, heat 7	Did not finish —, semifinal 2	Did not advance
Men's 400 metre hurdles	Semi- finalist	Geoffrey Burton	Walkover; 1st, heat 5	Did not finish —, semifinal 4	Did not advance
Men's 400 metre hurdles	Heats	John Densham	Unknown; 2nd, heat 2	Did not advance	
Men's 3200 metre steeplechase	1st	Arthur Russell (athlete)	None held	10:56.2; 1st, semifinal 1	10:47.8
Men's 3200 metre steeplechase	2nd	Arthur Robertson	None held	11:10.0; 1st, semifinal 4	10:48.4
Men's 3200 metre steeplechase	4th	Guy Holdaway	None held	Unknown; 1st, semifinal 5	11:26.0
Men's 3200 metre steeplechase	5th	Harry Sewell	None held	Unknown; 1st, semifinal 6	Unknown
Men's 3200 metre steeplechase	Semi- finalist	Joseph Kinchin	None held	Unknown; 2nd, semifinal 5	Did not advance
Men's 3200 metre steeplechase	—	Frank Buckley	None held	Did not finish —, semifinal 2	Did not advance
Men's 3200 metre steeplechase	—	Joseph English	None held	Did not finish —, semifinal 2	Did not advance
Men's 3200 metre steeplechase	—	Henry Barker	None held	Did not finish —, semifinal 3	Did not advance
Men's 3200 metre steeplechase	—	Billy Grantham	None held	Did not finish —, semifinal 6	Did not advance
Men's 3200 metre steeplechase	—	Thomas Downing	None held	Disqualified —, semifinal 1	Did not advance
Men's 3200 metre steeplechase	—	Richard Yorke	None held	Disqualified —, semifinal 4	Did not advance
Men's medley relay	Semi- finalist	George Hawkins; Henry Pankhurst; Edwin Montague; Theodore Just	None held	Unknown; 2nd, semifinal 3	Did not advance
Men's 3 mile team race (Note: The 3 mile team race used a point-for-place system with only the top three runners from each 5-man team counting. The International Olympic Committee only considers those three (Coales, Deakin, and Robertson for Great Britain) to be medallists.)	1st	Joe Deakin	None held	15:05.6; 2 points, team=6	14:39.6; 1 point, team=6
Men's 3 mile team race	1st	Arthur Robertson	None held	15:05.6; 3 points, team=6	14:41.0; 2 points, team=6
Men's 3 mile team race	1st	William Coales	None held	15:05.6; 1 point, team=6	14:41.6; 3 points, team=6
Men's 3 mile team race	No place	Harold A. Wilson	None held	15:05.6; No score, team=6	14:57.0; No score, team=6
Men's 3 mile team race	No place	Norman Hallows	None held	Did not finish No score, team=6	15:08.0; No score, team=6
Men's 5 miles	1st	Emil Voigt	None held	26:13.4; 1st, semifinal 2	25:11.2
Men's 5 miles	2nd	Edward Owen	None held	26:12.2; 1st, semifinal 6	25:24.0
Men's 5 miles	5th	Arthur Robertson	None held	25:50.2; 1st, semifinal 5	26:13.0
Men's 5 miles	10-12	James Murphy	None held	25:59.2; 1st, semifinal 4	Did not finish
Men's 5 miles	Semi- finalist	Samuel Stevenson	None held	Unknown; 3rd, semifinal 5	Did not advance
Men's 5 miles	—	William Coales	None held	Did not finish —, semifinal 1	Did not advance
Men's 5 miles	—	Joe Deakin	None held	Did not finish —, semifinal 4	Did not advance
Men's marathon	12th	William Clarke	None held		3:16:08.6
Men's marathon	13th	Ernest Barnes	None held		3:17:30.8
Men's marathon	15th	Fred Lord	None held		3:19:08.8
Men's marathon	17th	James Beale	None held		3:20:14.0
Men's marathon	—	Fred Appleby	None held		Did not finish
Men's marathon	—	Henry Barrett	None held		Did not finish
Men's marathon	—	Alexander Duncan	None held		Did not finish
Men's marathon	—	Thomas Jack	None held		Did not finish
Men's marathon	—	Jack Price	None held		Did not finish
Men's marathon	—	Frederick Thompson	None held		Did not finish
Men's marathon	—	Albert Wyatt	None held		Did not finish
Men's marathon	—	Samuel Stevenson	None held		Did not start
Men's 3500 metre walk	1st	George Larner	None held	15:32.0; 1st, semifinal 1	14:55.0
Men's 3500 metre walk	2nd	Ernest Webb	None held	15:17.2; 1st, semifinal 2	15:07.4
Men's 3500 metre walk	8th	Ralph Harrison	None held	16:04.4; 2nd, semifinal 3	Disqualified
Men's 3500 metre walk	9th	William J. Palmer	None held	16:33.0; 3rd, semifinal 1	Disqualified
Men's 3500 metre walk	10th	Ernest Larner	None held	16:10.0; 4th, semifinal 3	Did not advance
Men's 3500 metre walk	11th	John Butler	None held	16:17.0; 5th, semifinal 3	Did not advance
Men's 3500 metre walk	13th	Sydney Sarel	None held	17:06.0; 5th, semifinal 1	Did not advance
Men's 3500 metre walk	—	Bill Brown	None held	Disqualified —, semifinal 1	Did not advance
Men's 3500 metre walk	—	Richard Quinn	None held	Disqualified —, semifinal 2	Did not advance
Men's 3500 metre walk	—	James Reid	None held	Disqualified —, semifinal 2	Did not advance
Men's 10 mile walk	1st	George Larner	None held	1:18:19.0; 1st, semifinal 2	1:15:57.4
Men's 10 mile walk	2nd	Ernest Webb	None held	1:20:18.8; 1st, semifinal 1	1:17:31.0
Men's 10 mile walk	3rd	Edward Spencer	None held	1:21:25.4; 2nd, semifinal 1	1:21:20.2
Men's 10 mile walk	4th	Fred Carter	None held	1:21:25.4; 2nd, semifinal 1	1:21:20.2
Men's 10 mile walk	5th	Ernest Larner	None held	1:21:25.4; 2nd, semifinal 1	1:24:26.2
Men's 10 mile walk	6th	William J. Palmer	None held	1:19:04.0; 4th, semifinal 2	Unknown
Men's 10 mile walk	7th	Ralph Harrison	None held	1:18:21.2; 2nd, semifinal 2	Did not start
Men's 10 mile walk	9th	Gadwin Withers	None held	1:19:22.4; 5th, semifinal 2	Did not advance
Men's 10 mile walk	10th	Sydney Schofield	None held	1:21:07.4; 6th, semifinal 2	Did not advance
Men's 10 mile walk	12th	Thomas Hammond	None held	1:23:44.0; 6th, semifinal 1	Did not advance
Men's 10 mile walk	—	John Butler	None held	Did not finish —, semifinal 2	Did not advance
Men's 10 mile walk	—	Alfred Yeoumans	None held	Disqualified —, semifinal 1	Did not advance

==== Jumping ====
Event	Place	Athlete	Height/ Distance
Men's high jump	2nd	Con Leahy	1.88 metres
Men's high jump	7th	Patrick Leahy	1.78 metres
Men's high jump	10th	Edward Leader	1.77 metres
Men's high jump	10th	Haswell Wilson	1.77 metres
Men's high jump	20th	Alfred Bellerby	1.59 metres
Men's long jump	8th	Tim Ahearne	6.72 metres
Men's long jump	9th	Denis Murray	6.71 metres
Men's long jump	11th	Charles Williams	6.65 metres
Men's long jump	16th	Alfred Bellerby	6.44 metres
Men's long jump	17th	Wilfred Bleaden	6.43 metres
Men's long jump	18th	William Watt	6.42 metres
Men's long jump	21-32	Lionel Cornish	Unknown
Men's triple jump	1st	Tim Ahearne	14.92 metres
Men's triple jump	11th	Cyril Dugmore	13.31 metres
Men's triple jump	12th	Michael Dineen	13.23 metres
Men's triple jump	18-20	George Mayberry	Unknown
Men's standing high jump	8th	Walter Henderson	1.42 metres
Men's standing high jump	17th	Lancelot Stafford	1.32 metres
Men's standing high jump	19-23	Alfred Flaxman	Unknown
Men's standing long jump	8-25	Tim Ahearne	Unknown
Men's standing long jump	8-25	Wilfred Bleaden	Unknown
Men's standing long jump	8-25	Lionel Cornish	Unknown
Men's standing long jump	8-25	Walter Henderson	Unknown
Men's standing long jump	8-25	Frederick Kitching	Unknown
Men's standing long jump	8-25	Lancelot Stafford	Unknown

==== Throwing ====
Event	Place	Athlete	Distance
Men's shot put	2nd	Denis Horgan	13.62 metres
Men's shot put	5th	Edward Barrett	12.89 metres
Men's shot put	9-25	John Barrett	Unknown
Men's shot put	9-25	Henry Leeke	Unknown
Men's shot put	9-25	Tom Nicolson	Unknown
Men's discus throw	12-42	Edward Barrett	Unknown
Men's discus throw	12-42	Michael Collins	Unknown
Men's discus throw	12-42	Alfred Flaxman	Unknown
Men's discus throw	12-42	Walter Henderson	Unknown
Men's discus throw	12-42	Henry Leeke	Unknown
Men's discus throw	12-42	Ernest May	Unknown
Men's discus throw	12-42	John Murray	Unknown
Men's hammer throw	4th	Tom Nicolson	48.09 metres
Men's hammer throw	9th	Alan Fyffe	37.35 metres
Men's hammer throw	10-19	Henry Leeke	Unknown
Men's hammer throw	10-19	Robert Lindsay-Watson	Unknown
Men's hammer throw	10-19	Ernest May	Unknown
Men's hammer throw	10-19	John Murray	Unknown
Men's javelin throw	8-16	Henry Leeke	Unknown
Men's javelin throw	8-16	Ernest May	Unknown
Men's javelin throw	8-16	Jimmy Tremeer	Unknown
Men's Greek discus	11-23	John Barrett	Unknown
Men's Greek discus	11-23	Alfred Flaxman	Unknown
Men's Greek discus	11-23	Walter Henderson	Unknown
Men's Greek discus	11-23	Henry Leeke	Unknown
Men's Greek discus	11-23	Ernest May	Unknown
Men's freestyle javelin	10-33	Edward Barrett	Unknown
Men's freestyle javelin	10-33	Alfred Flaxman	Unknown
Men's freestyle javelin	10-33	Walter Henderson	Unknown
Men's freestyle javelin	10-33	Henry Leeke	Unknown
Men's freestyle javelin	10-33	Ernest May	Unknown

=== Boxing ===
Great Britain dominated the boxing competitions, taking 14 of the 15 medals including all 5 gold medals.

Weight class	Place	Boxer	Round of 16	Quarter- finals	Semi- finals	Final
Bantamweight; Up to 116 pounds	1st	A. Henry Thomas	Not held	Defeated McGurk; 2-0 decision	Bye	Defeated Condon; 2-0 decision
Bantamweight; Up to 116 pounds	2nd	John Condon	Not held	Defeated Mazior; KO, 3rd round	Defeated Webb; 2-0 decision	Lost to Thomas; 2-0 decision
Bantamweight; Up to 116 pounds	3rd	William Webb	Not held	Defeated Perry; 2-1 decision	Lost to Condon; 2-0 decision	Did not advance
Bantamweight; Up to 116 pounds	4th	Frank McGurk	Not held	Lost to Thomas; 2-0 decision	Did not advance	
Bantamweight; Up to 116 pounds	4th	Henry Perry	Not held	Lost to Webb; 2-1 decision	Did not advance	
Featherweight; Up to 126 pounds	1st	Richard Gunn	Not held	Defeated Poillot; KO, 2nd round	Defeated Ringer; 2-0 decision	Defeated Morris; 2-0 decision
Featherweight; Up to 126 pounds	2nd	Charles Morris	Not held	Defeated Adams; 2-0 decision	Defeated Roddin; 2-0 decision	Lost to Gunn; 2-0 decision
Featherweight; Up to 126 pounds	3rd	Hugh Roddin	Not held	Defeated Lloyd; 2-0 decision	Lost to Morris; 2-0 decision	Did not advance
Featherweight; Up to 126 pounds	4th	Thomas Ringer	Not held	Defeated Constant; 2-0 decision	Lost to Gunn; 2-0 decision	Did not advance
Featherweight; Up to 126 pounds	5th	Edward Adams	Not held	Lost to Morris; 2-0 decision	Did not advance	
Featherweight; Up to 126 pounds	5th	John Lloyd	Not held	Lost to Roddin; 2-0 decision	Did not advance	
Lightweight; Up to 140 pounds	1st	Frederick Grace	Defeated Fearman; 2-0 decision	Defeated Wells; 2-0 decision	Bye	Defeated Spiller; 2-0 decision
Lightweight; Up to 140 pounds	2nd	Frederick Spiller	Defeated Fee; 2-0 decision	Defeated Jessup; KO, 2nd round	Defeated Johnson; 2-0 decision	Lost to Grace; 2-0 decision
Lightweight; Up to 140 pounds	3rd	Harry Johnson	Defeated Hansen; 2-0 decision	Defeated Holmes; 2-1 decision	Lost to Spiller; 2-0 decision	Did not advance
Lightweight; Up to 140 pounds	4th	Harold Holmes	Defeated André Bouvier; KO, 2nd round	Lost to Johnson; 2-1 decision	Did not advance	
Lightweight; Up to 140 pounds	4th	George Jessup	Defeated Osborne; KO, 1st round	Lost to Spiller; KO, 2nd round	Did not advance	
Lightweight; Up to 140 pounds	4th	Matt Wells	Defeated Holberg; 4th-round decision	Lost to Grace; 2-0 decision	Did not advance	
Lightweight; Up to 140 pounds	7th	Edward Fearman	Lost to Grace; 2-0 decision	Did not advance		
Lightweight; Up to 140 pounds	7th	Patrick Fee	Lost to Spiller; 2-0 decision	Did not advance		
Lightweight; Up to 140 pounds	7th	Frank Osborne	Lost to Jessup; KO, 1st round	Did not advance		
Middleweight; Up to 158 pounds	1st	Johnny Douglas	Defeated Doudelle; KO, 1st round	Bye	Defeated Warnes; KO, 2nd round	Defeated Baker; 2-0 decision
Middleweight; Up to 158 pounds	3rd	William Philo	Defeated Murdoch; 2-1 decision	Bye	Lost to Baker; KO, 1st round	Did not advance
Middleweight; Up to 158 pounds	4th	Ruben Warnes	Defeated Morard; KO, 2nd round	Bye	Lost to Douglas; KO, 2nd round	Did not advance
Middleweight; Up to 158 pounds	5th	William Childs	Defeated Aspa; KO, 2nd round	Lost to Baker; 2-0	Did not advance	
Middleweight; Up to 158 pounds	6th	William Dees	Lost to Baker; KO, 2nd round	Did not advance		
Middleweight; Up to 158 pounds	6th	Arthur Murdoch	Lost to Philo; 2-1 decision	Did not advance		
Heavyweight; No limit	1st	Albert Oldman	Not held	Defeated Myrans; KO, 1st round	Bye	Defeated Evans; KO, 1st round
Heavyweight; No limit	2nd	Sydney Evans	Not held	Defeated Ireton; KO, 1st round	Defeated Frederick Parks; 2-1 decision	Lost to Oldman; KO, 1st round
Heavyweight; No limit	3rd	Frederick Parks	Not held	Defeated Brewer; 2-0 decision	Lost to Evans; 2-1 decision	Did not advance
Heavyweight; No limit	4th	Harold Brewer	Not held	Lost to Frederick Parks; 2-0 decision	Did not advance	
Heavyweight; No limit	4th	Albert Ireton	Not held	Lost to Evans; KO, 1st round	Did not advance	
Heavyweight; No limit	4th	Isaac Myrans	Not held	Lost to Oldman; KO, 1st round	Did not advance	

Opponent nation	Wins	Losses	Percent
Australasia	1	3	.250
France	7	0	1.000
Denmark	2	0	1.000
Total international	10	3	.769
Great Britain	24	24	.500
Total	34	27	.557

=== Cycling ===
Great Britain won 5 of a possible 7 gold medals in the cycling competitions, losing only the men's tandem to France and the men's sprint by exceeding the time limit (though a French cyclist finished first in that event as well).

Event	Place	Cyclist	Heats	Semifinals	Final
Men's 660 yards	1st	Victor Johnson	56.2 seconds 1st, heat 4	59.2 seconds 1st, semifinal 1	51.2 seconds
Men's 660 yards	4th	Daniel Flynn	55.0 seconds 1st, heat 13	54.8 seconds 1st, semifinal 3	Unknown
Men's 660 yards	Semi- finalist	Clarence Kingsbury	57.4 seconds 1st, heat 3	Unknown; 2nd, semifinal 2	Did not advance
Men's 660 yards	Semi- finalist	William Bailey	50.8 seconds 1st, heat 2	Unknown; 3rd, semifinal 2	Did not advance
Men's 660 yards	Semi- finalist	Benjamin Jones	59.0 seconds 1st, heat 1	Unknown; 3rd, semifinal 4	Did not advance
Men's 660 yards	Semi- finalist	Ernest Payne	57.2 seconds 1st, heat 12	Unknown; 4th, semifinal 3	Did not advance
Men's 660 yards	Heats	George Summers	Unknown; 2nd, heat 6	Did not advance	
Men's 660 yards	Heats	W. F. Magee	Unknown; 2nd, heat 11	Did not advance	
Men's 660 yards	Heats	Albert Denny	Unknown; 2nd, heat 16	Did not advance	
Men's 660 yards	Heats	J. L. Lavery	Unknown; 3rd, heat 7	Did not advance	
Men's 660 yards	Heats	George Anderson	Unknown; 4th, heat 14	Did not advance	
Men's 5000 metres	1st	Benjamin Jones	None held	9:08.8; 1st, semifinal 5	8:36.2
Men's 5000 metres	5th	Clarence Kingsbury	None held	8:53.0; 1st, semifinal 6	Unknown
Men's 5000 metres	Semi- finalist	Daniel Flynn	None held	Unknown; 2nd, semifinal 1	Did not advance
Men's 5000 metres	Semi- finalist	W. F. Magee	None held	Unknown; 2nd, semifinal 4	Did not advance
Men's 5000 metres	Semi- finalist	C. V. Clark	None held	Unknown; 2nd, semifinal 7	Did not advance
Men's 5000 metres	Semi- finalist	J. L. Lavery	None held	Unknown; 4-9, semifinal 5	Did not advance
Men's 5000 metres	Semi- finalist	Albert Calvert	None held	Unknown; 5-6, semifinal 6	Did not advance
Men's 5000 metres	—	William Bailey	None held	Did not finish —, semifinal 1	Did not advance
Men's 5000 metres	—	Ernest Payne	None held	Did not finish —, semifinal 2	Did not advance
Men's 20 kilometres	1st	Clarence Kingsbury	None held	32:33.8; 1st, semifinal 2	34:13.6
Men's 20 kilometres	2nd	Benjamin Jones	None held	32:39.0; 1st, semifinal 4	Unknown
Men's 20 kilometres	5-9	Albert Denny	None held	33:40.6; 1st, semifinal 6	Unknown
Men's 20 kilometres	5-9	Leon Meredith	None held	33:21.0; 1st, semifinal 1	Unknown
Men's 20 kilometres	Semi- finalist	Charlie Brooks	None held	32:34.0; 2nd, semifinal 2	Did not advance
Men's 20 kilometres	Semi- finalist	D. C. Robertson	None held	34:53.8; 2nd, semifinal 5	Did not advance
Men's 20 kilometres	Semi- finalist	Herbert Bouffler	None held	Unknown; 4th, semifinal 3	Did not advance
Men's 20 kilometres	—	Daniel Flynn	None held	Did not finish —, semifinal 1	Did not advance
Men's 20 kilometres	—	Frederick Hamlin	None held	Did not finish —, semifinal 3	Did not advance
Men's 20 kilometres	—	W. Lower	None held	Did not finish —, semifinal 4	Did not advance
Men's 100 kilometres	1st	Charles Bartlett	None held	Unknown; 2nd, semifinal 2	2:41:48.6
Men's 100 kilometres	2nd	Charles Denny	None held	Unknown; 7-9, semifinal 2	Unknown
Men's 100 kilometres	4th	William Pett	None held	Unknown; 6th, semifinal 2	Unknown
Men's 100 kilometres	7th	D. C. Robertson	None held	Unknown; 6th, semifinal 1	Unknown
Men's 100 kilometres	8th	Sydney Bailey	None held	Unknown; 3rd, semifinal 1	Unknown
Men's 100 kilometres	9-17	J. H. Bishop	None held	Unknown; 5th, semifinal 1	Did not finish
Men's 100 kilometres	9-17	Leon Meredith	None held	2:43:15.4; 1st, semifinal 2	Did not finish
Men's 100 kilometres	9-17	Harry Mussen	None held	Unknown; 7-14, semifinal 1	Did not finish
Men's 100 kilometres	Semi- finalist	John Norman	None held	Unknown; 7-14, semifinal 1	Did not advance
Men's 100 kilometres	—	R. Jolly	None held	Did not finish —, semifinal 2	Did not advance
Men's 100 kilometres	—	David Noon	None held	Did not finish —, semifinal 2	Did not advance
Men's sprint	Finalist	Victor Johnson	1:33.8; 1st, heat 1	1:27.4; 1st, semifinal 1	Time limit exceeded
Men's sprint	Finalist	Benjamin Jones	1:35.0; 1st, heat 12	1:40.8; 1st, semifinal 3	Time limit exceeded
Men's sprint	Finalist	Clarence Kingsbury	1:27.4; 1st, heat 15	1:35.6; 1st, semifinal 4	Time limit exceeded
Men's sprint	Semi- finalist	Daniel Flynn	1:30.2; 1st, heat 4	Unknown; 2-4, semifinal 2	Did not advance
Men's sprint	Semi- finalist	Ernest Payne	1:32.0; 1st, heat 5	Unknown; 2-4, semifinal 2	Did not advance
Men's sprint	Semi- finalist	J. L. Lavery	1:41.0; 1st, heat 14	Unknown; 3rd, semifinal 3	Did not advance
Men's sprint	Heats	George Summers	Unknown; 2nd, heat 13	Did not advance	
Men's sprint	Heats	John Matthews	Unknown; 3rd, heat 2	Did not advance	
Men's sprint	Heats	William Bailey	Unknown; 3rd, heat 7	Did not advance	
Men's sprint	Heats	Herbert Crowther	Unknown; 3rd, heat 8	Did not advance	
Men's sprint	—	W. F. Magee	Time limit exceeded —, heat 6	Did not advance	
Men's tandem	2nd	Frederick Hamlin; Thomas H. Johnson	3:14.8; 1st, heat 2	2:42.2; 1st, semifinal 1	Unknown
Men's tandem	3rd	Charlie Brooks; Walter Isaacs	2:42.2; 1st, heat 1	Unknown; 2nd, semifinal 1	Unknown
Men's tandem	Semi- finalist	John Matthews; Leon Meredith	2:43.2; 1st, heat 7	Unknown; 2nd, semifinal 2	Did not advance
Men's tandem	Semi- finalist	John Barnard; Arthur Rushen	Unknown; 2nd, heat 4	Unknown; 3rd, semifinal 2	Did not advance
Men's tandem	Heats	R. Jolly; John Norman	Unknown; 2nd, heat 6	Did not advance	
Men's tandem	Heats	C. McKaig; E. C. Piercy	Unknown; 3rd, heat 3	Did not advance	
Men's team pursuit	1st	Benjamin Jones; Clarence Kingsbury; Leon Meredith; Ernest Payne	Walkover; 1st, heat 1	2:19.6; 1st, semifinal 1	2:18.6

=== Diving ===
Event	Place	Diver	Preliminary groups	Semi- finals	Final
Men's 10 metre platform	8th	Harold Goodworth	76.00 points 2nd, group 1	59.48 points 4th, semifinal 2	Did not advance
Men's 10 metre platform	12th	George Cane	73.10 points 3rd, group 4	Did not advance	
Men's 10 metre platform	14th	James Aldous	68.00 points 5th, group 1	Did not advance	
Men's 10 metre platform	16th	William Hoare	65.20 points 3rd, group 2	Did not advance	
Men's 10 metre platform	19th	William Webb	57.70 points 4th, group 3	Did not advance	
Men's 10 metre platform	21st	Frank Collings	56.50 points 5th, group 3	Did not advance	
Men's 10 metre platform	23rd	Thomas Harrington	53.15 points 6th, group 5	Did not advance	
Men's 3 metre springboard	6th	Harold Clarke	78.60 points 2nd, group 2	81.10 points 4th, semifinal 2	Did not advance
Men's 3 metre springboard	7th	Herbert Pott	82.50 points 1st, group 4	79.60 points 3rd, semifinal 1	Did not advance
Men's 3 metre springboard	10th	Frank Errington	70.83 points 2nd, group 3	72.60 points 5th, semifinal 1	Did not advance
Men's 3 metre springboard	12th	Harold Smyrk	78.30 points 3rd, group 5	Did not advance	
Men's 3 metre springboard	14th	Harry Crank	70.30 points 4th, group 1	Did not advance	
Men's 3 metre springboard	16th	William Hoare	67.80 points 5th, group 3	Did not advance	
Men's 3 metre springboard	17th	Alexander Beckett	67.50 points 5th, group 1	Did not advance	
Men's 3 metre springboard	18th	William Bull	66.00 points 3rd, group 4	Did not advance	
Men's 3 metre springboard	20th	Thomas Cross	64.50 points 4th, group 5	Did not advance	
Men's 3 metre springboard	23rd	Anthony Taylor	58.80 points 3rd, group 2	Did not advance	

=== Fencing ===
Great Britain took second in the men's team épée competition, with Montgomerie also making it into a three-way playoff for 2nd, 3rd and 4th places in the individual event despite having been nearly eliminated in both the second round and the semifinals. His bottom placing in that playoff gave France a sweep of the medals. The British were less successful in sabre, with no fencers making it to the final in the individual competition and the team being eliminated in the first round.

Event	Place	Fencer	First round	Second round	Semi- final	Final
Men's épée	4th	Robert Montgomerie	6-1 (1st in I)	2-2 (2nd in 4)	3-4 (4th in 1)	6-3
Men's épée	5th	Cecil Haig	2-2 (3rd in K)	2-1 (1st in 8)	4-3 (2nd in 1)	2-5
Men's épée	8th	Martin Holt	3-4 (2nd in D)	3-1 (1st in 4)	4-3 (2nd in 2)	2-6
Men's épée	Second round	Leaf Daniell	5-1 (1st in G)	3-2 (3rd in 5)	Did not advance	
Men's épée	Second round	Sydney Martineau	3-2 (2nd in F)	2-2 (3rd in 7)	Did not advance	
Men's épée	Second round	Edgar Amphlett	4-1 (1st in J)	1-3 (5th in 2)	Did not advance	
Men's épée	Second round	Henri Davids	2-2 (2nd in M)	1-4 (5th in 3)	Did not advance	
Men's épée	First round	John Blake	2-4 (4th in C)	Did not advance		
Men's épée	First round	Percival Davson	3-4 (4th in E)	Did not advance		
Men's épée	First round	Ralph Chalmers	3-3 (4th in H)	Did not advance		
Men's épée	First round	Edgar Seligman	2-4 (4th in L)	Did not advance		
Men's épée	First round	Luke Fildes	2-6 (7th in A)	Did not advance		
Men's sabre	Semi- finalist	C. Barry Notley	3-2 (2nd in L)	2-2 (2nd in 1)	2-5 (7th in 1)	Did not advance
Men's sabre	Second round	William Marsh	3-1 (1st in D)	2-2 (3rd in 3)	Did not advance	
Men's sabre	Second round	Robert Badman	2-3 (3rd in G)	1-3 (4th in 2)	Did not advance	
Men's sabre	First round	Archibald Murray	2-2 (4th in B)	Did not advance		
Men's sabre	First round	Charles Wilson	2-3 (4th in H)	Did not advance		
Men's sabre	First round	Alfred Keene	2-3 (4th in I)	Did not advance		
Men's sabre	First round	Edward Brookfield	3-4 (4th in J)	Did not advance		
Men's sabre	First round	Douglas Godfree	0-5 (6th in C)	Did not advance		
Men's sabre	First round	Lockhart Leith	0-5 (6th in K)	Did not advance		
Men's sabre	First round	Alfred Chalke	1-5 (7th in M)	Did not advance		

Event	Place	Fencers	Play-in match	First round	Semi- finals	Final	Repechage	Silver medal match
Men's team épée	2nd	Leaf Daniell (all); Cecil Haig (1st, sf, r, sm); Martin Holt (p, 1st, sf, r); Robert Montgomerie (all) Edgar Seligman (1st) (Note: This fencer competed in the team event, but is not listed in the IOC medallist database.); Edgar Amphlett (sm)	Defeated Netherlands; 9-7 Advanced to first round	Defeated Germany; 13-5 Advanced to semifinals	Lost to France; 12-5 Relegated to repechage	Did not advance	Defeated Denmark; 9-8 Advanced to silver medal match	Defeated Belgium; 9-5 Won silver medal
Men's team sabre	6th	H. Evan James; William Marsh; Archibald Murray; Charles Wilson	Not held	Lost to Italy; 11-5 Out; 6th place	Did not advance		Not relegated	

=== Figure skating ===
Event	Place	Skater	Score
Men's singles	4th	Keiller Greig	310.9
Men's singles	5th	Albert March	232.0
Men's singles	—	Herbert Yglesias	Did not finish
Men's special figures	2nd	Arthur Cumming	32.8
Men's special figures	3rd	Geoffrey Hall-Say	20.8
Ladies' singles	1st	Madge Syers	252.5
Ladies' singles	3rd	Dorothy Greenhough-Smith	192.1
Ladies' singles	5th	Gwendoline Lycett	164.0
Pair skating	2nd	Phyllis Johnson; James H. Johnson	10.3
Pair skating	3rd	Madge Syers; Edgar Syers	9.6

=== Football ===
England national amateur football team represented Great Britain in the football competition.

Event	Place	Players	First round	Semifinals	Final	Bronze match
Men's football	1st	Horace Bailey, Arthur Berry, Frederick Chapman (captain), Walter Corbett, Harold Hardman, Robert Hawkes, Kenneth Hunt, Herbert Smith, Harold Stapley, Clyde Purnell, Vivian Woodward	Won vs. Sweden; 12-1	Won vs. Netherlands; 4-0	Won vs. Denmark; 2-0	Not relegated

=== Gymnastics ===
Gymnast	Event	Score	Rank
S. Walter Tysall	Men's all-around	312	2nd place, silver medalist(s)
Samuel Hodgetts	Men's all-around	266	6
Edward Potts	Men's all-around	252.5	9
George Bailey	Men's all-around	246	12
Franklin Dick	Men's all-around	233.5	16
Arthur Hodges	Men's all-around	252.5	16
William Watters	Men's all-around	225.5	23
James Graham	Men's all-around	225	24
Joseph Cook	Men's all-around	213	31
G. Meade	Men's all-around	205	37
Edgar Dyson	Men's all-around	195.5	42
Sidney Domville	Men's all-around	193.75	45
Robert Hanley	Men's all-around	193.5	46
John Watters	Men's all-around	187.5	48
William Fergus	Men's all-around	183.5	51
Edmund Aspinall	Men's all-around	177	56
C. H. Smith	Men's all-around	171.5	58
Oliver Bauscher	Men's all-around	149.5	73
A. V. Ford	Men's all-around	141.5	79
Leonard Hanson	Men's all-around	121	85

Event	Place	Gymnast	Score
Men's team	8th	Percy Baker, William Barrell, Robert Bonney, Henry Cattley, Mellor Clay, Edward Clough, James Cotterell, William Cowhig, G. C. Cullen, Frank Denby, Herbert Drury, W. Fitt, Harry Gill, Arthur Harley, Albert Hawkins, William Hoare, J. A. Horridge, Henry Huskinson, J. W. Jones, E. Justice, N. J. Keighley, Robert Laycock, Robert McGaw, J. McPhail, W. Manning, W. G. Merrifield, Charles Oldaker, G. Parrott, E. Parsons, Edward Richardson, Irven Robertshaw, George Ross, David Scott, J. F. Simpson, Walter Skeeles, Joshua Speight, Herbert Stell, C. V. Sederman, William Titt, Charles Vigurs, Enos Walton, H. Waterman, Edgar Watkins, John Whitaker, F. Whitehead	196

=== Hockey ===
Great Britain sent four teams, one from each of the Home Nations. Scotland and England defeated Germany and France, respectively, in the first round before facing each other in the semifinals. Their victories assured them medals, while Ireland and Wales had been guaranteed medals by receiving byes in the first round. England won in the semifinal against Scotland, while Ireland defeated Wales in the other semifinal. The two losing teams received bronze medals, while England took the gold by winning the final against Ireland, who received silver.

Event	Place	Players	First round	Semifinals	Final	5th/6th
Men's hockey	1st	England Louis Baillon, Harry Freeman, Eric Green, Gerald Logan, Alan Noble, Edgar Page, Reggie Pridmore, Percy Rees, John Yate Robinson, Stanley Shoveller, Harvey Wood	Won vs. France; 10-1	Won vs. Scotland; 6-1	Won vs. Ireland; 8-1	Not relegated
Men's hockey	2nd	Ireland Edward Allman-Smith, Henry Brown, Walter Campbell, William Graham, Richard Gregg, Edward Holmes, Robert Kennedy, Henry Murphy, Jack Peterson, Walter Peterson, Charles Power, Frank Robinson	Bye	Won vs. Wales; 3-1	Lost vs. England; 8-1	Not relegated
Men's hockey	3rd	Scotland Alexander Burt, John Burt, Alastair Denniston, Charles Foulkes, Hew Fraser, James Harper-Orr, Ivan Laing, Hugh Neilson, Gordon Orchardson, Norman Stevenson, Hugh Walker	Won vs. Germany; 4-0	Lost vs. England; 6-1	Did not advance	Not relegated
Men's hockey	3rd	Wales Frank Connah, Llewellyn Evans, Arthur Law, Richard Lyne, Wilfred Pallott, Frederick Phillips, Edward Richards, Charles Shephard, Bertrand Turnbull, Philip Turnbull, James Williams	Bye	Lost vs. Ireland; 3-1	Did not advance	Not relegated

Opponent nation	Wins	Losses	Percent
France	1	0	1.000
Germany	1	0	1.000
Total international	2	0	1.000
Great Britain	3	3	.500
Total	5	3	.625

=== Jeu de paume ===
In the jeu de paume competition, British players took the silver and bronze medals.

Event	Place	Player	Round of 16	Quarter- finals	Semi- finals	Final/ Bronze match
Jeu de paume	2nd	Eustace Miles	Defeated Sands; 6-3, 6-3, 6-3	Defeated Noel; 6-5, 6-1, 6-5	Defeated Lytton; 6-4, 6-1, 6-3	Lost to Gould; 6-5, 6-4, 6-4
Jeu de paume	3rd	Neville Bulwer-Lytton, 3rd Earl of Lytton	Bye	Defeated Biedermann; 6-5, 6-1, 6-2	Lost to Miles; 6-4, 6-1, 6-3	Defeated Page; 6-2, 6-4, 6-4
Jeu de paume	4th	Arthur Page	Bye	Defeated Palmer; 5-6, 6-4, 6-5, 6-1	Lost to Gould; 6-1, 6-0, 6-0	Lost to Lytton; 6-2, 6-4, 6-4
Jeu de paume	5th	Edwin Biedermann	Bye	Lost to Lytton; 6-5, 6-1, 6-2	Did not advance	
Jeu de paume	5th	Evan Noel	Defeated Tatham; 6-2, 6-3, 6-3	Lost to Miles; 6-5, 6-1, 6-5	Did not advance	
Jeu de paume	5th	Arthur Palmer	Bye	Lost to Page; 5-6, 6-4, 6-5, 6-1	Did not advance	
Jeu de paume	5th	Vane Pennell	Defeated Cazalet; 6-1, 6-4, 6-1	Lost to Gould; 6-3, 6-3, 6-2	Did not advance	
Jeu de paume	9th	William Cazalet	Lost to Pennell; 6-1, 6-4, 6-1	Did not advance		
Jeu de paume	9th	Charles Tatham	Lost to Noel; 6-2, 6-3, 6-3	Did not advance		

Opponent nation	Wins	Losses	Percent
United States	1	3	.250
Total international	1	3	.250
Great Britain	6	6	.500
Total	7	9	.438

=== Lacrosse ===
Great Britain lost the only lacrosse match played in 1908 to Canada, earning the silver medal.

Event	Place	Players	Final
Men's lacrosse	2nd	Gustav Alexander, J. Alexander, (Note: This player is listed as a reserve in the Official Report, and might not have actually played. Regardless, the IOC database lists him as a medallist.) L. Blockey, George Buckland, Eric Dutton, V. G. Gilbey, S. N. Hayes, Frank S. Johnson, Wilfrid Johnson, Edward Jones, Reginald Martin, Gerald Mason, G. J. Mason, Johnson Parker-Smith, Hubert Ramsay, Charles Scott, H. Shorrocks, Norman Whitley	Lost vs. Canada; 14-10

=== Polo ===
Great Britain was the only nation to compete in polo in 1908, with two English teams and an Irish team competing.

Event	Place	Players	Match 1	Match 2
Men's polo	1st	Roehampton; Charles Darley Miller, George Arthur Miller, Patteson Womersley Nickalls, Herbert Haydon Wilson	Defeated Hurlingham; 3-1	Defeated Ireland; 8-1
Men's polo	2nd	Hurlingham Club; Walter Buckmaster, Frederick Freake, Walter Jones, John Wodehouse	Lost to Roehampton; 3-1	Bye
Men's polo	2nd	Ireland; John Hardress Lloyd, John Paul McCann, Percy O'Reilly, Auston Rotherham	Bye	Lost to Roehampton; 8-1

=== Rackets ===
The host nation was the only one to compete in rackets in 1908.

Event	Place	Player	Round of 16	Quarter- finals	Semi- finals	Final
Men's singles	1st	Evan Noel	Defeated Browning; 3-1	Defeated Pennell; 3-0	Defeated Astor; 3-0	Defeated Leaf; Walkover
Men's singles	2nd	Henry Leaf	Bye	Bye	Defeated Brougham; 3-0	Lost to Noel; Walkover
Men's singles	3rd	John Jacob Astor	Bye	Bye	Lost to Noel; 3-0	did not advance
Men's singles	3rd	Henry Brougham	Bye	Bye	Lost to Leaf; 3-0	did not advance
Men's singles	5th	Vane Pennell	Bye	Lost to Noel; 3-0	Did not advance	
Men's singles	6th	Browning	Lost to Noel; 3-1	Did not advance		
Men's doubles	1st	John Jacob Astor; Vane Pennell	None held		Defeated Leaf & Noel; 4-2	Defeated Browning & Bury; 4-1
Men's doubles	2nd	Cecil Browning; Edmund Bury	None held		Bye	Lost to Astor & Pennell; 4-1
Men's doubles	3rd	Henry Leaf; Evan Noel	None held		Lost to Astor & Pennell; 4-2	Did not advance

=== Rowing ===
Event	Place	Rowers	First round	Quarter- finals	Semi- finals	Final
Men's single sculls	1st	Harry Blackstaffe	Bye	10.3; 1st, quarterfinal 3	10.14 seconds 1st, semifinal 2	9.26
Men's single sculls	2nd	Alexander McCulloch	Bye	10.8; 1st, quarterfinal 4	10.22 seconds 1st, semifinal 1	Unknown
Men's coxless pair	1st	John Fenning; Gordon Thomson	None held		9.46; 1st, semifinal 1	9.41
Men's coxless pair	2nd	George Fairbairn; Philip Verdon	None held		11.5; 1st, semifinal 2	Unknown
Men's coxless four	1st	Collier Cudmore, James Angus Gillan, Duncan Mackinnon, John Somers-Smith	None held		8.34; 1st, semifinal 1	8.34
Men's coxless four	2nd	Philip Filleul, Harold Barker, John Fenning, Gordon Thomson	None held		9.4; 1st, semifinal 2	Unknown
Men's eight	1st	Albert Gladstone, Frederick Kelly, Banner Johnstone, Guy Nickalls, Charles Burnell, Ronald Sanderson, Raymond Etherington-Smith, Henry Bucknall, Gilchrist Maclagan	None held	8.10; 1st, quarterfinal 2	8.12; 1st, semifinal 1	8.34
Men's eight	3rd	Frank Jerwood, Eric Powell, Oswald Carver, Edward Williams, Henry Goldsmith, Harold Kitching, John Burn, Douglas Stuart, Richard Boyle	None held	Bye	Unknown; 2nd, semifinal 2	Did not advance

=== Rugby ===
Great Britain lost the only rugby union match played in 1908 to Australasia, earning the silver medal. The British representative was the Cornwall county team, which had won the 1907 county championships.

Event	Place	Players	Final
Men's rugby union	2nd	John Jackett, J. C. Solomon, Bertram Solomon, Frederick Dean, J. T. Jose, Thomas Wedge, James Davey, Richard Jackett, E. J. Jones, Arthur Wilson, Nicholas Tregurtha, A. Lawrey, C. R. Marshall, A. Wilcocks, John Trevaskis	Lost vs. Australasia; 32-3

=== Sailing ===
Great Britain took all four of the sailing gold medals, without contest in the cases of the 7 metre class (where only one boat entered) and the 12 metre class (where both boats were British).

Class	Place	Boat	Sailors
6 metre	1st	Dormy	Gilbert Laws, Thomas McMeekin, Charles Crichton
6 metre	4th	Sibindi	Johan Leuchars, Wilfrid Leuchars, Frank Smith
7 metre	1st	Heroine	Charles Rivett-Carnac, Richard Dixon, Norman Bingley, Frances Rivett-Carnac
8 metre	1st	Cobweb	Blair Cochrane, Arthur Wood, Henry Sutton, John Rhodes, Charles Campbell
8 metre	3rd	Sorais	Philip Hunloke, Alfred Hughes, Frederick Hughes, George Ratsey, William Ward
12 metre	1st	Hera	T. C. Glen Coats (helmsman), J. H. Downes (mate), J. S. Aspin, John Buchanan, J. C. Bunten, A. D. Downes, David Dunlop, John Mackenzie, Albert Martin, Gerald Tait
12 metre	2nd	Mouchette	C. MacIver (helmsman), J. G. Kenion (mate), J. M. Adam, James Baxter, W. P. Davidson, J. F. Jellico, T. A. R. Littledale, C. R. MacIver, C. Macleod Robertson, J. F. D. Spence

=== Shooting ===
Event	Place	Shooter	Score
Men's 1000 yard free rifle	1st	Joshua Milner	98
Men's 1000 yard free rifle	3rd	Maurice Blood	92
Men's 1000 yard free rifle	4th	Richard Barnett	92
Men's 1000 yard free rifle	4th	Ted Ranken	92
Men's 1000 yard free rifle	6th	Thomas Caldwell	91
Men's 1000 yard free rifle	6th	John Sellars	91
Men's 1000 yard free rifle	16th	Thomas Fremantle	87
Men's 1000 yard free rifle	19th	Percy Whitehead	86
Men's 1000 yard free rifle	24th	John Hopton	84
Men's 1000 yard free rifle	28th	Alexander Rogers	82
Men's 300 metre free rifle	10th	Jesse Wallingford	828
Men's 300 metre free rifle	11th	Maurice Blood	825
Men's 300 metre free rifle	20th	Arthur Jackson	771
Men's 300 metre free rifle	26th	Robert Hawkins	752
Men's 300 metre free rifle	40th	Henry Chaney	671
Men's team free rifle	6th	Jesse Wallingford; Harold Hawkins; Charles Churcher; Thomas Raddall; James Bostock; Robert Brown	4355
Men's team military rifle	2nd	Harcourt Ommundsen; Fleetwood Varley; Arthur Fulton; Philip Richardson; William Padgett; John Martin	2497
Men's stationary target small-bore rifle	1st	Arthur Carnell	387
Men's stationary target small-bore rifle	2nd	Harold Humby	386
Men's stationary target small-bore rifle	3rd	George Barnes	385
Men's stationary target small-bore rifle	4th	Maurice Matthews	384
Men's stationary target small-bore rifle	5th	Edward Amoore	383
Men's stationary target small-bore rifle	6th	William Pimm	379
Men's stationary target small-bore rifle	7th	Archie Taylor	376
Men's stationary target small-bore rifle	8th	Harold Hawkins	374
Men's stationary target small-bore rifle	9th	Jack Warner	373
Men's stationary target small-bore rifle	10th	Arthur Wilde	370
Men's stationary target small-bore rifle	12th	James Milne	368
Men's stationary target small-bore rifle	14th	William Milne	363
Men's moving target small-bore rifle	1st	John Fleming	24
Men's moving target small-bore rifle	2nd	Maurice Matthews	24
Men's moving target small-bore rifle	3rd	William Marsden	24
Men's moving target small-bore rifle	4th	Edward Newitt	24
Men's moving target small-bore rifle	5th	Philip Plater	22
Men's moving target small-bore rifle	6th	William Pimm	21
Men's moving target small-bore rifle	7th	William Milne	21
Men's moving target small-bore rifle	9th	William Styles	17
Men's moving target small-bore rifle	10th	Arthur Wilde	13
Men's moving target small-bore rifle	13th	James Milne	12
Men's moving target small-bore rifle	19th	Edward Amoore	3
Men's moving target small-bore rifle	19th	Harold Hawkins	3
Men's disappearing target small-bore rifle	1st	William Styles	45
Men's disappearing target small-bore rifle	2nd	Harold Hawkins	45
Men's disappearing target small-bore rifle	3rd	Edward Amoore	45
Men's disappearing target small-bore rifle	4th	William Milne	45
Men's disappearing target small-bore rifle	5th	James Milne	45
Men's disappearing target small-bore rifle	6th	Arthur Wilde	45
Men's disappearing target small-bore rifle	8th	Harold Humby	45
Men's disappearing target small-bore rifle	9th	John Fleming	42
Men's disappearing target small-bore rifle	9th	Maurice Matthews	42
Men's disappearing target small-bore rifle	9th	Edward Newitt	42
Men's disappearing target small-bore rifle	15th	William Pimm	39
Men's disappearing target small-bore rifle	15th	Philip Plater	39
Men's team small-bore rifle	1st	Maurice Matthews; Harold Humby; William Pimm; Edward Amoore	771
Men's single-shot running deer	2nd	Ted Ranken	24
Men's single-shot running deer	3rd	Alexander Rogers	24
Men's single-shot running deer	4th	Maurice Blood	23
Men's single-shot running deer	5th	Albert Kempster	22
Men's single-shot running deer	6th	James Cowan	21
Men's single-shot running deer	6th	William Russell Lane-Joynt	21
Men's single-shot running deer	9th	Joshua Millner	20
Men's single-shot running deer	10th	Charles Nix	19
Men's single-shot running deer	12th	William Ellicott	16
Men's double-shot running deer	2nd	Ted Ranken	46
Men's double-shot running deer	4th	Maurice Blood	34
Men's double-shot running deer	5th	Albert Kempster	34
Men's double-shot running deer	6th	William Ellicott	33
Men's double-shot running deer	6th	Alexander Rogers	33
Men's double-shot running deer	9th	John Bashford	25
Men's double-shot running deer	10th	James Cowan	24
Men's double-shot running deer	11th	Charles Nix	22
Men's double-shot running deer	13th	William Russell Lane-Joynt	20
Men's double-shot running deer	15th	Joshua Millner	15
Men's team single-shot running deer	2nd	Charles Nix; William Russell Lane-Joynt; William Ellicott; Ted Ranken	85
Men's individual pistol	5th	Jesse Wallingford	467
Men's individual pistol	7th	William Ellicott	458
Men's individual pistol	11th	Geoffrey Coles	449
Men's individual pistol	13th	Henry Lynch-Staunton	443
Men's individual pistol	14th	William Russell Lane-Joynt	442
Men's individual pistol	16th	William Newton	440
Men's individual pistol	23rd	Charles Wirgman	425
Men's individual pistol	28th	Peter Jones	407
Men's individual pistol	31st	J. Nelson Le Fevre	399
Men's individual pistol	39th	Henry Munday	358
Men's individual pistol	42nd	John Bashford	329
Men's team pistol	3rd	Jesse Wallingford; Geoffrey Coles; Henry Lynch-Staunton; William Ellicott	1817
Men's individual trap shooting	3rd	Alexander Maunder	57
Men's individual trap shooting	5th	Charles Palmer	55
Men's individual trap shooting	7th	Bob Hutton	53
Men's individual trap shooting	10th	Frederic Moore	52
Men's individual trap shooting	11th	George Whitaker	51
Men's individual trap shooting	12th	John Pike	50
Men's individual trap shooting	17th	Henry Creasey	46
Men's individual trap shooting	17th	Percy Easte	46
Men's individual trap shooting	19th	Gerald Merlin	45
Men's individual trap shooting	20th	William Morris	44
Men's individual trap shooting	24th	John Butt	26
Men's team trap shooting	1st	Percy Easte; Alexander Maunder; Frederic Moore; Charles Palmer; John Pike; John Postans	407
Men's team trap shooting	3rd	John Butt; Henry Creasey; Bob Hutton; William Morris; George Herbert Skinner; George Whitaker	372

=== Swimming ===
Event	Place	Swimmer	Heats	Semifinals	Final
Men's 100 metre freestyle	Semi- finalist	George Dockrell	1:13.2; 1st, heat 8	1:11.4; 3rd, semifinal 2	Did not advance
Men's 100 metre freestyle	Semi- finalist	Addin Tyldesley	1:12.0; 2nd, heat 2	Unknown; 5th, semifinal 2	Did not advance
Men's 100 metre freestyle	Semi- finalist	Wilfred Edwards	1:05.8; 1st, heat 7	Unknown; 5-6, semifinal 1	Did not advance
Men's 100 metre freestyle	Semi- finalist	Paul Radmilovic	1:12.0; 2nd, heat 6	Unknown; 5-6, semifinal 1	Did not advance
Men's 100 metre freestyle	Heats	John Derbyshire	1:12.6; 2nd, heat 4	Did not advance	
Men's 100 metre freestyle	Heats	George Innocent	Unknown; 3rd, heat 5	Did not advance	
Men's 400 metre freestyle	1st	Henry Taylor	5:42.2; 1st, heat 6	5:41.0; 2nd, semifinal 1	5:36.8
Men's 400 metre freestyle	4th	William Foster	5:54.8; 1st, heat 2	5:52.2; 2nd, semifinal 2	Unknown
Men's 400 metre freestyle	Semi- finalist	Sydney Battersby	5:48.8; 1st, heat 1	Unknown; 3rd, semifinal 1	Did not advance
Men's 400 metre freestyle	Semi- finalist	Paul Radmilovic	6:10.0; 1st, heat 5	Unknown; 3rd, semifinal 2	Did not advance
Men's 400 metre freestyle	Heats	Sam Blatherwick	6:16.8; 2nd, heat 4	Did not advance	
Men's 400 metre freestyle	Heats	William Haynes	6:21.2; 2nd, heat 7	Did not advance	
Men's 400 metre freestyle	Heats	Archibald Sharp	7:00.4; 2nd, heat 9	Did not advance	
Men's 1500 metre freestyle	1st	Henry Taylor	23:24.4; 1st, heat 6	22:54.0; 1st, semifinal 1	22:48.4
Men's 1500 metre freestyle	2nd	Sydney Battersby	23:42.8; 1st, heat 4	23:23.0; 1st, semifinal 2	22:51.2
Men's 1500 metre freestyle	Semi- finalist	William Foster	24:33.0; 1st, heat 7	Unknown; 3rd, semifinal 1	Did not advance
Men's 1500 metre freestyle	Semi- finalist	Lewis Moist	26:52.0; 1st, heat 3	Unknown; 4th, semifinal 1	Did not advance
Men's 1500 metre freestyle	Semi- finalist	John Jarvis	25:51.6; 1st, heat 5	Did not finish —, semifinal 2	Did not advance
Men's 1500 metre freestyle	Semi- finalist	Paul Radmilovic	25:02.4; 1st, heat 1	Did not start —, semifinal 2	Did not advance
Men's 1500 metre freestyle	Heats	Sam Blatherwick	25:15.4; 2nd, heat 2	Did not advance	
Men's 1500 metre freestyle	Heats	Robert Hassell	28:14.8; 3rd, heat 5	Did not advance	
Men's 100 metre backstroke	3rd	Herbert Haresnape	1:26.2; 1st, heat 4	1:28.8; 2nd, semifinal 2	1:27.0
Men's 100 metre backstroke	Semi- finalist	Jack Taylor	1:25.8; 1st, heat 6	Unknown; 3rd, semifinal 2	Did not advance
Men's 100 metre backstroke	Semi- finalist	Sidney Parvin	1:35.2; 1st, heat 5	Unknown; 4th, semifinal 1	Did not advance
Men's 100 metre backstroke	Semi- finalist	Colin Lewis	1:30.2; 1st, heat 3	Unknown; 4th, semifinal 2	Did not advance
Men's 100 metre backstroke	Heats	Frederick Unwin	1:30.0; 2nd, heat 1	Did not advance	
Men's 100 metre backstroke	Heats	Sidney Willis	1:34.4; 2nd, heat 2	Did not advance	
Men's 100 metre backstroke	Heats	Eric Seward	Unknown; 3rd, heat 7	Did not advance	
Men's 200 metre breaststroke	1st	Fred Holman	3:10.6; 1st, heat 1	3:10.0; 1st, semifinal 1	3:09.2
Men's 200 metre breaststroke	2nd	William Robinson	3:13.0; 1st, heat 5	1:11.8; 1st, semifinal 2	3:12.8
Men's 200 metre breaststroke	Heats	Percy Courtman	3:18.4; 2nd, heat 7	Did not advance	
Men's 200 metre breaststroke	Heats	Alf Davies	Unknown; 3rd, heat 3	Did not advance	
Men's 200 metre breaststroke	Heats	Sydney Gooday	Unknown; 3rd, heat 4	Did not advance	
Men's 200 metre breaststroke	Heats	Frederick Naylor	Unknown; 4-5, heat 2	Did not advance	
Men's 4×200 metre freestyle relay	1st	William Foster; Paul Radmilovic; John Derbyshire; Henry Taylor	None held	10:53.4; 1st, semifinal 2	10:55.6

=== Tennis ===
Great Britain took all 6 gold medals in the lawn tennis competitions in 1908.

Event	Place	Name	Round of 64	Round of 32	Round of 16	Quarter- finals	Semi- finals	Final
Men's singles	1st	Josiah Ritchie	Bye	Defeated Gauntlett	Defeated Crawley	Defeated Germot	Defeated Eaves	Defeated Froitzheim
Men's singles	3rd	Wilberforce Eaves	Defeated Kinzl	Bye	Defeated Bissing	Defeated Dixon	Lost to Ritchie	Did not advance
Men's singles	5th	George Caridia	Bye	Defeated Kitson	Defeated R. Powell	Lost to Froitzheim	Did not advance	
Men's singles	5th	Charles Dixon	Defeated Rahe	Defeated Lauber	Defeated Hykš	Lost to Eaves	Did not advance	
Men's singles	9th	Walter Crawley	Bye	Bye	Lost to Ritchie	Did not advance		
Men's singles	9th	James Parke	Bye	Defeated Tóth	Lost to Froitzheim	Did not advance		
Men's singles	26th	Kenneth Powell	Lost to Froitzheim	Did not advance				
Women's singles	1st	Dorothea Chambers	None held		Bye	Defeated Morton	Defeated Winch	Defeated Boothby
Women's singles	2nd	Penelope Boothby	None held		Bye	Bye	Bye	Lost to Chambers
Women's singles	3rd	Ruth Winch	None held		Bye	Bye	Lost to Chambers	Did not advance
Women's singles	4th	Agnes Morton	None held		Defeated Greene	Lost to Chambers	Did not advance	
Women's singles	5th	Alice Greene	None held		Lost to Morton	Did not advance		
Men's doubles	1st	George Hillyard; Reginald Doherty	None held	Bye	Bye	Defeated; Crawley/K. Powell	Defeated; Cazalet/Dixon	Defeated; Ritchie/Parke
Men's doubles	2nd	Josiah Ritchie; James Parke	None held	Bye	Defeated; Zsigmondy/Tóth	Defeated; Piepes/Zborzil	Bye	Lost to Hillyard/Doherty
Men's doubles	3rd	Clement Cazalet; Charles Dixon	None held	Bye	Defeated; C. van Lennep/R. van Lennep	Defeated; Gauntlett/Kitson	Lost to Hillyard/Doherty	Did not advance
Men's doubles	4th	Walter Crawley; Kenneth Powell	None held	Bye	Defeated; Foulkes/R. Powell	Lost to Hillyard/Doherty	Did not advance	

Event	Place	Name	Round of 16	Quarter- finals	Semi- finals	Final
Men's indoor singles	1st	Arthur Gore	Bye	Bye	Defeated Ritchie	Defeated Caridia
Men's indoor singles	2nd	George Caridia	Bye	Defeated Setterwall	Defeated Eaves	Lost to Gore
Men's indoor singles	3rd	Josiah Ritchie	Bye	Bye	Lost to Gore	did not advance
Men's indoor singles	4th	Wilberforce Eaves	Bye	Defeated Boström	Lost to Caridia	did not advance
Men's indoor singles	7th	Lionel Escombe	Lost to Setterwall	Did not advance		
Women's indoor singles	1st	Gwendoline Eastlake-Smith	None held	Defeated Pinkney	Defeated Wallenberg	Defeated Greene
Women's indoor singles	2nd	Alice Greene	None held	Defeated Boothby	Defeated Adlerstråhle	Lost to Eastlake-Smith
Women's indoor singles	5th	Penelope Boothby	None held	Lost to Greene	Did not advance	
Women's indoor singles	5th	Mildred Coles	None held	Lost to Wallenberg	Did not advance	
Women's indoor singles	5th	Violet Pinkney	None held	Lost to Eastlake-Smith	Did not advance	
Men's indoor doubles	1st	Herbert Barrett; Arthur Gore	None held	Bye	Defeated; Escombe/Ritchie	Defeated; Caridia/Simond
Men's indoor doubles	2nd	George Caridia; George Simond	None held	Defeated; Eaves/Hillyard	Defeated; Boström/Setterwall	Lost to Barrett/Gore
Men's indoor doubles	4th	Lionel Escombe; Josiah Ritchie	None held	Bye	Lost to Barrett/Gore	Did not advance
Men's indoor doubles	5th	Wilberforce Eaves; George Hillyard	None held	Lost to Caridia/Simond	Did not advance	

Opponent nation	Wins	Losses	Percent
Austria	2	0	1.000
Bohemia	1	0	1.000
Canada	2	0	1.000
France	1	0	1.000
Germany	3	3	.500
Hungary	2	0	1.000
Netherlands	1	0	1.000
South Africa	3	0	1.000
Sweden	5	3	.625
Total international	20	6	.769
Great Britain	19	19	.500
Total	39	25	.609

=== Tug of war ===
Great Britain sent three police teams to compete in tug of war in 1908. They took the three medals, with the Liverpool police eliminating both foreign entrants (the United States in the only quarterfinal match and Sweden in the semifinals). The City of London team defeated the Metropolitan police in the other semifinal, going on to defeat the Liverpool squad in the final. The Metropolitan team won the bronze medal by default when the Swedes did not appear for the bronze match.

Event	Place	Athletes	Quarterfinals	Semifinals	Final
Tug of war	1st	City of London Police; Edward Barrett, Henry Duke, Frederick W. Goodfellow, Frederick H. Humphreys, William Hirons, Albert Ireton, Frederick Merriman, Edwin A. Mills, John James Shepherd	Bye	Defeated (GBR) Metropolitan Police "K" Division	Defeated (GBR) Liverpool Police
Tug of war	2nd	Liverpool Police; James M. Clarke, Thomas Butler, Charles Foden, William Greggan, Alexander Kidd, Daniel McDonald Lowey, Patrick Philbin, George Smith, Thomas Swindlehurst	Defeated; United States	Defeated; Sweden	Lost to (GBR) City of London Police
Tug of war	3rd	Metropolitan Police "K" Division; Walter Chaffe, Joseph Dowler, Ernest W. Ebbage, Thomas Homewood, Alexander Munro, William Slade, Walter B. Tammas, T. J. Williams, James Woodget	Bye	Lost to (GBR) City of London Police	Did not advance

=== Water motorsports ===
Great Britain had a boat finish in each of two races in the water motorsports competitions, thereby winning two gold medals in the midst of a gale. No British boat finished in the third race, leaving the final gold medal to France, which competed only in the open class.

Event	Place	Boat	Sailors	Result
Class A — Open class	—	Wolseley-Siddely	Hugh Grosvenor, 2nd Duke of Westminster; George Clowes; Joseph Frederick Laycock (first race only); G. H. Atkinson (second race only)	Race cancelled (first race); Ran aground (second race)
Class A — Open class	—	Dylan	Thomas Scott-Ellis, 8th Baron Howard de Walden; A. G. Fentiman	Retired, race cancelled (first race); Did not start (second race)
Class B — Under 60 feet	1st	Gyrinus	Isaac Thomas Thornycroft; Bernard Redwood; John Field-Richards (Note: Field Richards is not listed in the IOC medallist database.)	Finished
Class B — Under 60 feet	—	Quicksilver	John Marshall Gorham; Mrs. Gorham	Did not finish
Class C — 6.5–8 metres	1st	Gyrinus	Thomas Thornycroft; Bernard Redwood	Finished
Class C — 6.5–8 metres	—	Sea Dog	Warwick Wright; Thomas Weston	Did not finish

=== Water polo ===
Event	Place	Water poloists	Quarterfinals	Semifinals	Final
Men's water polo	1st	George Cornet, Charles Forsyth, George Nevinson, Paul Radmilovic, Charles Sydney Smith, Thomas Thould, George Wilkinson	Bye	Bye	Defeated Belgium; 9-2

=== Wrestling ===
Event	Place	Wrestler	Round of 32	Round of 16	Quarter- finals	Semi- finals	Final
Greco-Roman lightweight	9th	Ernest Blount	Bye	Lost to Persson	Did not advance		
Greco-Roman lightweight	9th	George Faulkner	Bye	Lost to Møller	Did not advance		
Greco-Roman lightweight	9th	Albert Hawkins	Defeated; Carlsen	Lost to Radvány	Did not advance		
Greco-Roman lightweight	9th	William Wood	Defeated; Halík	Lost to Maróthy	Did not advance		
Greco-Roman lightweight	17th	George Mackenzie	Lost to Malmström	Did not advance			
Greco-Roman lightweight	17th	Albert Rose	Lost to Maróthy	Did not advance			
Greco-Roman lightweight	17th	William Ruff	Lost to Radvány	Did not advance			
Greco-Roman lightweight	17th	Albert Whittingstall	Lost to Møller	Did not advance			
Greco-Roman middleweight	9th	Edgar Bacon	Bye	Lost to Eriksen	Did not advance		
Greco-Roman middleweight	9th	Frederick Beck	Defeated; Challstorp	Lost to Andersson	Did not advance		
Greco-Roman middleweight	9th	Gerald Bradshaw	Bye	Lost to Mårtensson	Did not advance		
Greco-Roman middleweight	17th	Stanley Bacon	Lost to Andersson	Did not advance			
Greco-Roman light heavyweight	5th	Alfred Banbrook	Bye	Defeated; Meesen	Lost to Jensen	Did not advance	
Greco-Roman light heavyweight	9th	Cyril Brown	Bye	Lost to Dubois	Did not advance		
Greco-Roman light heavyweight	9th	Ernest Nixson	Bye	Lost to Saarela	Did not advance		
Greco-Roman light heavyweight	9th	Walter West	Defeated; Šustera	Lost to Weckman	Did not advance		
Greco-Roman light heavyweight	17th	Henry Foskett	Lost to Dubois	Did not advance			
Greco-Roman super heavyweight	5th	Edward Barrett	None held		Lost to Payr	Did not advance	
Greco-Roman super heavyweight	5th	Frederick Humphreys	None held		Lost to Petrov	Did not advance	

Event	Place	Wrestler	Round of 16	Quarter- finals	Semi- finals	Final
Freestyle bantamweight	2nd	William Press	Defeated; Whiterall	Defeated; Sansom	Defeated; Tomkins	Lost to Mehnert
Freestyle bantamweight	4th	Frederick Tomkins	Defeated; W. Cox	Defeated; Saunders	Lost to Press	Lost to Côté
Freestyle bantamweight	5th	Fred Davis	Defeated; Knight	Lost to Côté	Did not advance	
Freestyle bantamweight	5th	Burt Sansom	Defeated; Schwan	Lost to Press	Did not advance	
Freestyle bantamweight	5th	George Saunders	Defeated; J. Cox	Lost to Tomkins	Did not advance	
Freestyle bantamweight	5th	Harry Sprenger	Bye	Lost to Mehnert	Did not advance	
Freestyle bantamweight	9th	John Cox	Lost to Saunders	Did not advance		
Freestyle bantamweight	9th	William Cox	Lost to Tomkins	Did not advance		
Freestyle bantamweight	9th	Frank Knight	Lost to Davis	Did not advance		
Freestyle bantamweight	9th	George Schwan	Lost to Sansom	Did not advance		
Freestyle bantamweight	9th	Henry Witherall	Lost to Press	Did not advance		
Freestyle featherweight	2nd	James Slim	Bye	Defeated; Peake	Defeated; Tagg	Lost to Dole
Freestyle featherweight	3rd	William McKie	Bye	Defeated; White	Lost to Dole	Defeated; Tagg
Freestyle featherweight	4th	William Tagg	Bye	Defeated; Goddard	Lost to Slim	Lost to McKie
Freestyle featherweight	5th	Alfred Goddard	Defeated; Couch	Lost to Tagg	Did not advance	
Freestyle featherweight	5th	Sidney Peake	Bye	Lost to Slim	Did not advance	
Freestyle featherweight	5th	James Webster	Defeated; Adams	Lost to Dole	Did not advance	
Freestyle featherweight	5th	Joseph White	Defeated; Jones	Lost to McKie	Did not advance	
Freestyle featherweight	9th	Walter Adams	Lost to Webster	Did not advance		
Freestyle featherweight	9th	Percy Cockings	Lost to Dole	Did not advance		
Freestyle featherweight	9th	Risdon Couch	Lost to Goddard	Did not advance		
Freestyle featherweight	9th	William Jones	Lost to White	Did not advance		
Freestyle lightweight	1st	George de Relwyskow	Defeated; Henson	Defeated; Shepherd	Defeated; Gingell	Defeated; Wood
Freestyle lightweight	2nd	William Wood	Defeated; Faulkner	Defeated; Krug	Defeated; G. McKenzie	Lost to Relwyskow
Freestyle lightweight	3rd	Albert Gingell	Bye	Defeated; Baillie	Lost to Relwyskow	Defeated; G. McKenzie
Freestyle lightweight	4th	George McKenzie	Bye	Defeated; J. McKenzie	Lost to Wood	Lost to Gingell
Freestyle lightweight	5th	Harry Baillie	Bye	Lost to Gingell	Did not advance	
Freestyle lightweight	5th	John McKenzie	Bye	Lost to G. McKenzie	Did not advance	
Freestyle lightweight	5th	William Shepherd	Bye	Lost to Relwyskow	Did not advance	
Freestyle lightweight	9th	George Faulkner	Lost to Wood	Did not advance		
Freestyle lightweight	9th	William Henson	Lost to Relwyskow	Did not advance		
Freestyle lightweight	9th	John Hoy	Lost to Krug	Did not advance		
Freestyle middleweight	1st	Stanley Bacon	Defeated; Chenery	Defeated; Coleman	Defeated; Beck	Defeated; Relwyskow
Freestyle middleweight	2nd	George de Relwyskow	Defeated; Challstorp	Defeated; E. Bacon	Defeated; Andersson	Lost to S. Bacon
Freestyle middleweight	3rd	Frederick Beck	Bye	Defeated; Narganes	Lost to S. Bacon	Defeated; Andersson
Freestyle middleweight	5th	Edgar Bacon	Defeated; Bradshaw	Lost to Relwyskow	Did not advance	
Freestyle middleweight	5th	Aubrey Coleman	Defeated; Wallis	Lost to S. Bacon	Did not advance	
Freestyle middleweight	9th	Gerald Bradshaw	Lost to E. Bacon	Did not advance		
Freestyle middleweight	9th	Horace Chenery	Lost to S. Bacon	Did not advance		
Freestyle middleweight	9th	Arthur Wallis	Lost to Coleman	Did not advance		
Freestyle heavyweight	1st	George Con O'Kelly	Defeated; Talbott	Defeated; Foskett	Defeated; Barrett	Defeated; Gundersen
Freestyle heavyweight	3rd	Edward Barrett	Bye	Defeated; Brown	Lost to O'Kelly	Defeated; Nixson
Freestyle heavyweight	4th	Ernest Nixson	Bye	Defeated; Bruce	Lost to Gundersen	Lost to Barrett
Freestyle heavyweight	5th	Louis Bruce	Defeated; Banbrook	Lost to Nixson	Did not advance	
Freestyle heavyweight	5th	Frederick Humphreys	Bye	Lost to Gundersen	Did not advance	
Freestyle heavyweight	5th	Henry Foskett	Bye	Lost to O'Kelly	Did not advance	
Freestyle heavyweight	5th	Charles Brown	Bye	Lost to Barrett	Did not advance	
Freestyle heavyweight	9th	Alfred Banbrook	Lost to Bruce	Did not advance		
Freestyle heavyweight	9th	Walter West	Lost to Gundersen	Did not advance		

Opponent nation	Wins	Losses	Percent
Belgium	1	2	.333
Bohemia	2	0	1.000
Canada	0	2	.000
Denmark	1	4	.200
Finland	0	2	.000
Hungary	0	5	.000
Norway	1	3	.250
Russia	0	1	.000
Sweden	4	5	.444
United States	3	7	.300
Total international	12	31	.279
Great Britain	38	38	.500
Total	50	69	.420

== Sources ==
- Cook, Theodore Andrea (1908). The Fourth Olympiad, Being the Official Report: The Olympic Games of 1908 (PDF). London: British Olympic Association. Archived from the original (PDF) on 27 September 2007.
- De Wael, Herman (2001). "Top London 1908 Olympians". Herman's Full Olympians. Archived from the original on 12 July 2006.
- Reyes, Macario (2001). "IV. Olympiad London 1908 Football Tournament". Rec. Sport.Soccer Statistics Foundation.
