= Tug of war at the 1908 Summer Olympics =

Men's tug of war at the Games of the IV Olympiad
- Venue: White City Stadium
- Dates: July 17–18, 1908
- Competitors: 40 from 3 nations

Medalists
1st place, gold medalist(s)		City of London Police; Great Britain
2nd place, silver medalist(s)		Liverpool City Police; Great Britain
3rd place, bronze medalist(s)		Metropolitan Police "K" Division; Great Britain

At the 1908 Summer Olympics, a tug of war tournament was contested. Each team consisted of 8 athletes. Nations could enter up to 3 teams. The host Great Britain was the only one to enter more than one (entering the maximum of 3 teams). Germany, Greece, Sweden, and the United States each entered one team apiece, though Germany and Greece withdrew. This left 5 teams (40 athletes) from 3 nations to compete.

== Medal table ==
Position	Country	Gold	Silver	Bronze	Total
1	Great Britain	1	1	1	3
—	Sweden	0	0	0	0
—	United States	0	0	0	0

== Medal summary ==
Gold	Silver	Bronze
City of London Police; Great Britain	Liverpool Police; Great Britain	Metropolitan Police "K" Division; Great Britain

== Team rosters ==
=== Great Britain ===
==== City of London Police ====
- Edward Barrett
- Frederick Goodfellow
- Frederick Humphreys
- William Hirons
- Albert Ireton
- Frederick Merriman
- Edwin Mills
- John James Shepherd

==== Liverpool Police ====
- Charles Foden (captain)
- James Clarke
- Thomas Butler
- William Greggan
- Alexander Kidd
- Daniel McDonald Lowey
- Patrick Philbin
- George Smith
- Thomas Swindlehurst

==== Metropolitan Police "K" Division ====
- Walter Chaffe
- Joseph Dowler
- Ernest Ebbage
- Thomas Homewood
- Alexander Munro
- William Slade
- Walter Tammas
- James Woodget

=== Sweden ===
- Albrekt Almqwist
- Frans Fast
- Carl-Emil Johansson
- Emil Johansson
- Knut Johansson
- Karl Krook
- Karl-Gustaf Nilsson
- Anders Wollgarth

=== United States ===
- Wilbur Burroughs
- Wesley Coe
- Arthur Dearborn
- John Flanagan
- Bill Horr
- Matt McGrath
- Ralph Rose
- Lee Talbott

== Results ==
=== Quarterfinals ===
The German and Greek teams withdrew, narrowing the seven-team field to five. Thus, the Swedish team and two of the British squads had byes in the quarterfinals.

The only match held was between the Liverpool team and the Americans. Liverpool won the first pull easily, after which the United States delegation protested against the footwear worn by the Liverpool police, who competed in their service boots. The protest was dismissed, and the Americans withdrew in disgust.

Winners		Score	Losers	
Liverpool Police	Great Britain	2-0 (forfeit)	United States of America	United States
Sweden	Sweden	—	Bye	
City of London Police	Great Britain	—	Bye	
Metropolitan Police "K" Division	Great Britain	—	Bye	

=== Semifinals ===
Liverpool again faced a foreign opponent, and again prevailed. The two London services squared off in the other semifinal, with the City police beating the Metropolitan men in a lengthy first pull. The second pull was not as tight a contest.

Winners		Score	Losers	
Liverpool Police	Great Britain	2-0	Sweden	Sweden
City of London Police	Great Britain	2-0	Metropolitan Police "K" Division	Great Britain

=== Final ===
The Londoners defeated Liverpool in the final, winning the first two pulls.

Winners		Score	Losers	
City of London Police	Great Britain	2-0	Liverpool Police	Great Britain

=== Bronze medal match ===
The Swedish team did not appear for the bronze medal match.

Winners		Score	Losers	
Metropolitan Police "K" (Stepney) Division	Great Britain	walkover	Sweden	Sweden

== Sources ==
- Cook, Theodore Andrea (1908). The Fourth Olympiad, Being the Official Report. London: British Olympic Association.
- De Wael, Herman (2001). "Tug-of-War 1908". Herman's Full Olympians. Archived from the original on 26 February 2005.
- Rosters
