= Foden =

Foden is a surname. Notable people with the surname include:

- Ben Foden (born 1985), English rugby union player
- Charles Foden (1868–1908), British tug of war competitor
- Edward Edgar Foden (1913–1985), English engineer
- Giles Foden (born 1967), British author
- Joe Foden (1918–1995), Australian rules footballer
- Phil Foden (born 2000), English footballer
- Wendy Foden (born 1975), South African conservation biologist
- William Foden (1860–1947), American composer and guitarist

== See also ==
- Foden Trucks, a former British truck and bus manufacturer
  - Foden NC, a double-decker bus built by Foden in the 1970s
  - Foden's Band, a brass band connected with Foden's truck and bus manufacturers
- ERF (truck manufacturer), founded in 1933 by Edwin Richard Foden
