= Swindlehurst =

Swindlehurst is a surname. Notable people with the surname include:

- Dave Swindlehurst (born 1956), English footballer
- Lee Swindlehurst (born 1960), American electrical engineer
- Owen Swindlehurst (1928–1995), British bishop
- Thomas Swindlehurst, British tug of war competitor
