= Orchardson (surname) =

Orchardson is a surname. Notable people with the name include:

- Gordon Orchardson (1885–1969), Scottish field hockey player
- William Quiller Orchardson (1832–1910), Scottish portraitist
