= Edward Allman-Smith =

Irish field hockey player

- Born: 3 November 1886
- Died: 17 November 1969 (aged 83)
- Military career
- Allegiance: United Kingdom
- Branch: British Army → Royal Army Medical Corps
- Rank: Brigadier
- Conflicts: First World War; Second World War

Olympic medal record

Men's field hockey

Representing (United Kingdom) Great Britain (Ireland)
Silver medal – second place	1908 London	Team

Brigadier Edward Percival Allman-Smith MC (3 November 1886 – 17 November 1969) was an Irish soldier and field hockey player.

== Hockey player ==
Allman-Smith played hockey for Dublin University Hockey Club and Ireland. He was a member of the Ireland team that won the silver medal at the 1908 London Olympics. Allman-Smith played in both the 3–1 win against Wales on 29 October and in the 8–1 defeat against England in the final on 31 October. The Ireland team was part of the Great Britain Olympic team.

== Military career ==
During the First World War Allman-Smith served as an officer in the Royal Army Medical Corps. He was awarded the Military Cross in August 1917.

During the Second World War, between 1941 and 1942 he served as Deputy Director of Medical Services for Mandatory Palestine and Trans-Jordan. He retired from the army in 1949.
