= Frank Connah =

Field hockey player

Personal information
- Born: 1884 Warrington, England
- Died: 20 December 1954 (aged 70) St Asaph, Wales

Sport
- Sport: Field hockey
- Position: Half-back
Senior career
| Years | Team | Caps | Goals |
| 1908 | Colwyn Bay | - | - |
National team
| Years | Team | Caps | Goals |
| 1908 | Wales | | - |
Medal record
Representing Great BritainWales
Olympic Games
| Bronze medal – third place | 1908 London | Team |

Frank Arthur Connah (Q2. 1884 – 20 December 1954) was a field hockey player from Wales who won a bronze medal as part of the Welsh team in the 1908 Summer Olympics.

== Biography ==
Connah was born in Warrington, England, the son to a well-knowns Welsh player called Charles Connah.

With only six teams participating in the field hockey tournament at the 1908 Olympic Games in London, he represented Wales under the Great British flag, where the team were awarded a bronze medal despite Wales only playing in and losing one match.

He played club hockey for Rhyl, Colwyn Bay and St. Asaph Hockey Clubs. At representative level he played for North Wales with hs brother Harold.

Both he and his brother Harold worked in the family cycle business in Rhyl.
