= Charles Shepherd (field hockey) =

Welsh field hockey player

Personal information
- Born: 27 February 1887 Barbados
- Died: 31 July 1968 (aged 81) Cardiff, Wales

Sport
- Sport: Field hockey
Senior career
Years	Team	Caps	Goals
1908	Whitchurch	-	-
National team
Years	Team	Caps	Goals
–	Wales		-
Medal record
Representing Great BritainWales
Olympic Games
Bronze medal – third place	1908 London	Team

Charles Woolley Shepherd (27 February 1887 – 31 July 1968) was a field hockey player from Wales who competed in the 1908 Summer Olympics with the Welsh team and won the bronze medal.

== Biography ==
Shepherd was born in Barbados, the son of a doctor. In 1891, the family moved to Cardiff in Wales and after studying Cardiff College, London University, and Charing Cross Hospital, Shepherd would follow his father's trade by becoming a GP himself.

He made his debut for Wales against Scotland in 1907 and played club hockey for Whitchurch Hockey Club.

With only six teams participating in the field hockey tournament at the 1908 Olympic Games in London, he represented Wales under the Great British flag, where the team were awarded a bronze medal despite Wales only playing in and losing one match.
