= Llewellyn Evans =

Welsh field hockey player

Personal information
- Born: 2 January 1876 Kaiapoi, Canterbury, New Zealand
- Died: 20 December 1954 (aged 78) Kaiapoi, Canterbury, New Zealand

Sport
- Sport: Field hockey
- Position: Full-back
Senior career
Years	Team	Caps	Goals
1908	Rhyl	-	-
National team
Years	Team	Caps	Goals
1908	Wales		-
Medal record
Representing Great BritainWales
Olympic Games
Bronze medal – third place	1908 London	Team

Llewellyn Blackwell Evans (2 January 1876 – 29 September 1951) was a field hockey player from Wales who competed in the 1908 Summer Olympics and won the bronze medal as a member of the Welsh team.

== Biography ==
Evans born in New Zealand and farmed there before emigrating to Wales in 1902. He played club hockey for Rhyl Hockey Club from 1908.

With only six teams participating in the field hockey tournament at the 1908 Olympic Games in London, he represented Wales under the Great British flag, where the team were awarded a bronze medal despite Wales only playing in and losing one match.

In Rhyl he was a brick manufacturer and was an Urban District councillor and later a Justice of the Peace. He returned to New Zealand in 1912.
