= Lacrosse at the 1908 Summer Olympics =

Men's lacrosse at the Games of the IV Olympiad
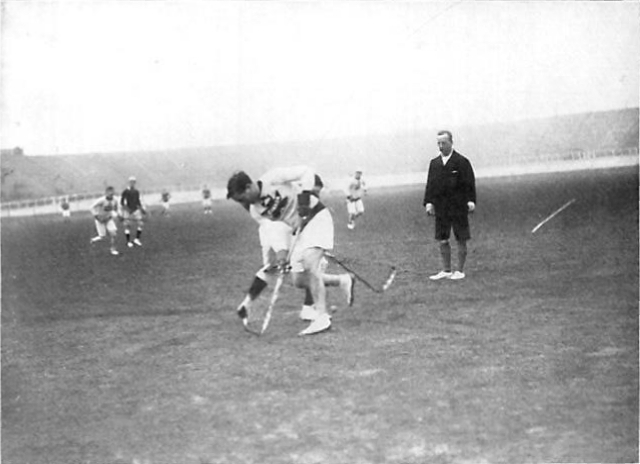
- Patrick Brennan goes for a ground ball.
- Venue: White City Stadium
- Date: October 24
- Competitors: 33 from 2 nations

Medalists
1st place, gold medalist(s)		Canada
2nd place, silver medalist(s)		Great Britain

A field lacrosse game was played between Canada and Great Britain at the 1908 Summer Olympics. The game was tied 9-9 in the fourth period, before Canada scored 5 straight goals to pull ahead. Canada won 14-10 to earn their second of two gold medals, the only lacrosse gold medals given out in the Olympic Games.

== Background ==
The game marked the second appearance of lacrosse at the Olympics, the first being at the 1904 Summer Olympics. Only two teams competed — one fewer than in 1904. South Africa was slated to send a team but then withdrew prior to the tournament.

Both teams held try-outs to select the players to represent their country. The Official Report notes that it was the "first time in the history of Canadian lacrosse a team had been selected from all parts of the Dominion," with players from clubs "as far apart as New Westminster and Montreal." The report also credits the British team as "by far the strongest ever put into the field" by England, though admits the sport was "not yet as well-known as it ought to be on this side of the Atlantic."

== Medal table ==
Position	Country	Gold	Silver	Bronze	Total
1	Canada	1	0	0	1
2	Great Britain	0	1	0	1

== Participants ==
Gold	Silver	Bronze
Canada; Frank Dixon; George Campbell; Gus Dillon; Richard Louis Duckett; George Rennie; Clarence McKerrow; Alexander Turnbull; Henry Hoobin; Ernest Hamilton; John Broderick; Tommy Gorman; Patrick Brennan (Capt.); Dan McLeod; Andy Mara; Charlie Fyon	Great Britain; George Alexander; George Buckland; Eric Dutton; Sydney Hayes; Wilfrid Johnson; Edward Jones; Reginald Martin; Gerald Mason; Johnson Parker-Smith; Hubert Ramsey (Capt.); Charles Scott; Norman Whitley; C. J. Mason; F. S. Johnson; V. G. Gilbey; H. Shorrocks; James Caldwell Alexander; L. Blockey	None awarded

== Results ==
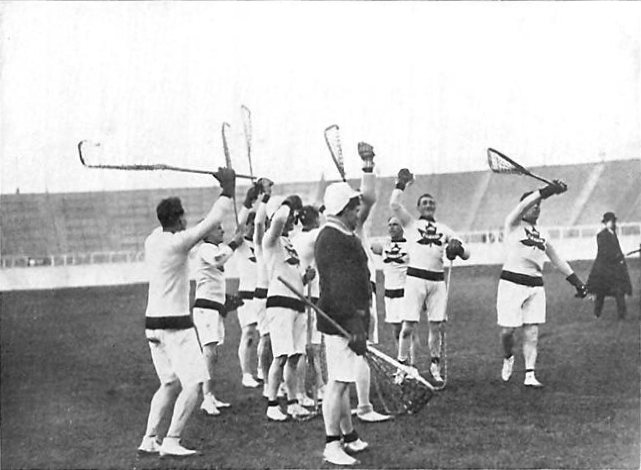
The Canadian team cheering after their win.

Final
October 24	Great Britain	10	-	14	Canada	White City
		(1	-	5)
		(2	-	6)
		(7	-	9)

Scoring summary

- FIRST QUARTER (5-1): Canada: Hoobin (2), Turnbull (2), Brennan; England: Buckland
- SECOND QUARTER: (6-2) Canada: Brennan; England: Buckland
- THIRD QUARTER (9-7): Canada: Brennan, Gorman, Turnbull; England: Buckland (3), Jones (2)
- FOURTH QUARTER (14-10): Canada: Brennan (3), Gorman, Turnbull; England: Jones (2), Alexander

== See also ==
- Federation of International Lacrosse
- World Lacrosse Championship

== Sources ==
- "Lacrosse at the 1908 London Summer Games". Sports Reference. Archived from the original on 2020-04-17.
- "Laws of Lacrosse - Special Code for Olympic Games" (PDF). LA84 Foundation. pp. 503–509. Archived from the original (PDF) on December 26, 2013.
