= Harry Freeman (field hockey) =

Field hockey player

Personal information
- Born: 7 February 1876 Staines, Middlesex, England
- Died: 5 October 1968 (aged 92) Wycombe, Buckinghamshire, England

Sport
- Sport: Field hockey
- Position: Full-back
Senior career
| Years | Team | Caps | Goals |
| 1899–1913 | Staines | - | - |
National team
| Years | Team | Caps | Goals |
| 1903–1908 | England | 10 | - |
Medal record
Men's field hockey
Representing Great Britain
| Gold medal – first place | 1908 London | Team competition |

Harry Scott Freeman (7 February 1876 – 5 October 1968) was a field hockey player, who won a gold medal with the Great Britain team at the 1908 Summer Olympics in London.

== Biography ==
Freeman took up hockey aged 18 in 1894 and was one of five brothers that played for Staines Hockey Club between 1894 and 1922.

He made his England debut in 1903 and captained his club and county Middlesex. He also captained the South at representative level, which led to him being chosen as the captain for the 1908 Olympic Games. He retired from international hockey after the Olympics although he did continue to play at club level and was later the Honorary Treasurer of the Hockey Association. He was a solicitor by profession and was involved with the Thames Amateur Rowing Association, Thames United Sailing Club, Upper Thames Sailing Club and Staines Boat Club.
