= Edwin Richards (field hockey) =

Field hockey player

Personal information
- Born: 15 December 1879 Llanover, Wales
- Died: 10 December 1930 (aged 50) Ipswich, England

Sport
- Sport: Field hockey
Senior career
Years	Team	Caps	Goals
1908	Abergavenny	-	-
National team
Years	Team	Caps	Goals
1908	Wales		-
Medal record
Representing Great BritainWales
Olympic Games
Bronze medal – third place	1908 London	Team

Edwin William Gruffydd Richards (sometimes referred to as Edward; 15 December 1879 – 10 December 1930) was a field hockey player from Wales who competed in the 1908 Summer Olympics and won the bronze medal as a member of the Welsh team.

== Biography ==
Richards was the son of Susanna Thomas and Edwin William Richards, an iron monger from Goytre. His father died from Typhoid on the 3 September 1879; Edwin was born later that year on 15 December.

With only six teams participating in the field hockey tournament at the 1908 Olympic Games in London, he represented Wales under the Great British flag, where the team were awarded a bronze medal despite Wales only playing in and losing one match.

He played club hockey for Abergavenny Hockey Club and would later captain his nation. By trade he was an architect working for Johnson, Richards, and Rees and was a member of the Royal Institute of British Architects. He would later live in the village of Cefn Coed and become a parish councillor.

He was taken ill during a shooting party and died in Ipswich on 10 December 1930 at the age of 50.
