= James Clarke (athlete) =

British tug of war competitor

Olympic medal record

Men's Tug of war
| Silver medal – second place | 1908 London | Team |

James Michael Clarke (6 October 1874 – 29 December 1929) was an Irish tug of war competitor who competed in the 1908 Summer Olympics.

He was from Bohola in county Mayo and was a cousin of Martin Sheridan and competed against his cousin during the Tug of War event at the 1908 London Olympics, in which he won the silver medal as member of the British team Liverpool Police.
