= Frederick Phillips (field hockey) =

Field hockey player

Personal information
- Born: 13 March 1884 Newport, Wales
- Died: 19 January 1948 (aged 63) Chepstow, Wales

Sport
- Sport: Field hockey
Senior career
Years	Team	Caps	Goals
1908	Newport	-	-
National team
Years	Team	Caps	Goals
1908	Wales		-
Medal record
Representing Great BritainWales
Olympic Games
Bronze medal – third place	1908 London	Team

Frederick Gordon Phillips (13 March 1884 – 19 January 1948) was a field hockey player from Wales, who won a bronze medal as part of the Welsh team in the 1908 Summer Olympics.

== Biography ==
Philips was from Newport, Monmouthshire, the son of a brewer and wine merchant.

With only six teams participating in the field hockey tournament at the 1908 Olympic Games in London, he represented Wales under the Great British flag, where the team were awarded a bronze medal despite Wales only playing in and losing one match.

He played club hockey for Newport Hockey Club.
