= Arthur Law (field hockey) =

Welsh field hockey player

Sport
- Sport: Field hockey
- Position: Wing-half / inside forward
Senior career
Years	Team	Caps	Goals
1908	Trefnant	-	-
National team
Years	Team	Caps	Goals
1908	Wales		-
Medal record
Representing Great BritainWales
Olympic Games
Bronze medal – third place	1908 London	Team

Arthur Law was a field hockey player from Wales who won a bronze medal at the 1908 Summer Olympics in London.

== Biography ==
With only six teams participating in the field hockey tournament at the 1908 Olympic Games in London, he represented Wales under the Great British flag, where the team were awarded a bronze medal despite Wales only playing in and losing one match.

He played club hockey for Colwyn Bay and Trefnant Hockey Clubs.
