= Robert Kennedy (field hockey) =

Irish field hockey player (1880–1963)

Olympic medal record

Men's field hockey

Representing (United Kingdom) Great Britain (Ireland)
| Silver medal – second place | 1908 London | Team |

Robert L. Kennedy (31 July 1880 – 22 April 1963) was an Irish field hockey player who competed in the 1908 Summer Olympics. In 1908 he represented the United Kingdom of Great Britain and Ireland as a member of the Irish national team. He won the silver medal with the team Ireland.
