= Alexander Kidd =

British tug of war competitor

Olympic medal record

Men's Tug of war
| Silver medal – second place | 1908 London | Team |

Alexander Kidd was a British tug of war competitor who competed in the 1908 Summer Olympics. In 1908 he won the silver medal as member of the British team Liverpool Police.
