= Wilfred Pallott =

Welsh field hockey player

Personal information
- Born: 5 November 1884 Cardiff, Wales
- Died: 7 November 1957 (aged 73) St. Brides-super-Ely, Wales

Sport
- Sport: Field hockey
Senior career
Years	Team	Caps	Goals
1908	Whitchurch	-	-
National team
Years	Team	Caps	Goals
1908	Wales	11	-
Medal record
Representing Great BritainWales
Olympic Games
Bronze medal – third place	1908 London	Team

Wilfred James Pallot (5 November 1884 – 17 November 1957) was a field hockey player from Wales, who competed in the 1908 Summer Olympics who won the bronze medal as a member of the Welsh team.

== Biography ==
Pallott was born in Cardiff, a son of a Jersey mariner who died at sea in 1896, when he was 11-years-old.

With only six teams participating in the field hockey tournament at the 1908 Olympic Games in London, he represented Wales under the Great British flag, where the team were awarded a bronze medal despite Wales only playing in and losing one match.

He played club hockey for Whitchurch Hockey Club and South Wales at representative level.

By trade, Pallott was an accountant. From 1928 to his death in 1957 he was a senior partner with Richard Leyshon & Co. in Cardiff.
