= George Smith (athlete) =

British tug of war competitor

Olympic medal record

Men's Tug of war
Silver medal – second place	1908 London	Team

George Smith (1876 – 14 January 1915) was a British tug of war competitor who competed in the 1908 Summer Olympics. In 1908, he won the silver medal as member of the British team Liverpool Police.
