= James Woodget =

British tug of war competitor

Olympic medal record

Men's Tug of war
| Bronze medal – third place | 1908 London | Team |

James Henry Woodget (28 September 1874 – 3 October 1960) was a British tug of war competitor who competed in the 1908 Summer Olympics. In 1908, he won the bronze medal as a member of the British team Metropolitan Police "K" Division.
