= Norman Whitley =

British army officer and lacrosse player (1883–1957)

Olympic medal record

Representing United Kingdom

Men's Lacrosse
Silver medal – second place	1908 London	Team competition

Sir Norman Henry Pownall Whitley, MC (29 June 1883 – 12 April 1957) was a barrister and judge. He was a silver medallist in lacrosse at the 1908 Summer Olympics.

== Biography ==
Whitley was born in Chorlton, Manchester, and educated at Emmanuel College, Cambridge. He entered the Inner Temple to study law and was called to the bar in 1907.

In the 1908 Summer Olympics hosted by Great Britain, Whitley was a member of the British Lacrosse team, which went on to win a silver medal, losing to Canada in the final.

On the outbreak of the First World War, he was commissioned into the Manchester Regiment and served in Gallipoli, where he was awarded the Military Cross. After evacuation from Gallipoli, he served in Palestine and Arabia and was demobilized in 1920 with the rank of Major.

Returning to the legal profession, he was appointed a Deputy Public Prosecutor in Penang in 1920 but soon afterward (1922) transferred to the Straits Settlements (Singapore) in the same capacity. In 1929, he was appointed a Puisne Judge and then Judge and Acting Chief Justice for the Federated Malay States. Finally, in 1937, he was appointed Chief Justice of Uganda, serving until his retirement in 1947. He was made a Knight Bachelor in the 1941_New_Year_Honours. He was later Chairman of the Uganda Cotton Industry Commission.

He married Florence May Erskine and had five children. His son Peter married Lady Mary Cambridge.
