= Thomas Homewood =

British tug of war competitor

Personal information
- National team: Great Britain
- Born: 25 September 1881
- Died: 1 February 1945 (aged 63) Stratford, London
- Cause of death: V2 rocket strike
Medal record
Men's Tug of war
Bronze medal – third place	1908 London	Team

Thomas Homewood (25 September 1881 – 1 February 1945) was a British tug of war competitor who competed in the 1908 Summer Olympics. He won the bronze medal as a member of the British team Metropolitan Police "K" Division.

He was killed during World War II in February 1945, aged 63, when his home in Stratford, London was struck by a V2 rocket.
