= Charles Scott (lacrosse) =

British lacrosse player

Olympic medal record

Representing United Kingdom

Men's Lacrosse
Silver medal – second place	1908 London	Team competition

Charles Hubert Scott (October 27, 1883 – November 7, 1954) was a British lacrosse player who competed in the 1908 Summer Olympics. He was part of the British team, which won the silver medal.
