= Johnson Parker-Smith =

British lacrosse player

- Born: Johnson Parker Smith; 14 January 1882; Chelford, Cheshire, England
- Died: 13 July 1926 (aged 44); Marple, Cheshire, England
- Occupation: Chartered Accountant
- Known for: Olympic Silver Medalist - Lacrosse

Olympic medal record

Representing United Kingdom

Men's Lacrosse
Silver medal – second place	1908 London	Team competition

Johnson Parker-Smith (14 January 1882 – 13 July 1926) was a British lacrosse player who competed in the 1908 Summer Olympics. He was part of the British team, which won the silver medal. Smith was born in 1882 in Chelford near Macclesfield in Cheshire. His father, also Johnson Parker Smith, was a merchant. Smith became a chartered accountant.
