= Wilfrid Johnson =

British lacrosse player

Olympic medal record

Representing United Kingdom

Men's Lacrosse
Silver medal – second place	1908 London	Team competition

Wilfrid Alexander Johnson (October 15, 1885 – June 21, 1960) was a British lacrosse player who competed in the 1908 Summer Olympics. He was part of the British team, which won the silver medal.

He read greats at Balliol College, Oxford and later became an accountant in the Civil Service. During the First World War, he served in the Royal Naval Air Service.
