= Gerald Mason (lacrosse) =

British lacrosse player

- Born: 12 August 1877; Ashton-on-Mersey, Cheshire, England
- Died: 30 September 1951 (aged 74); Barnstaple, Devon, England
- Occupations: Salesman, lacrosse player
- Known for: Olympic Silver Medalist - Lacrosse

Olympic medal record

Representing United Kingdom

Men's Lacrosse
| Silver medal – second place | 1908 London | Team competition |

Gerald Mason (12 August 1877 – 30 September 1951) was a British lacrosse player who competed in the 1908 Summer Olympics. He was part of the British team, which won the silver medal.
