= George Alexander (lacrosse) =

British lacrosse player (1886-1929)

Personal information
- Nationality: United Kingdom
- Born: 1886 Eccles, Greater Manchester, England
- Died: 14 November 1929 (aged 42–43) Wilmslow, Cheshire, England
Medal record
Representing United Kingdom
Men's Lacrosse
Silver medal – second place	1908 London	Team competition

George Percival Alexander (1886 – 14 November 1929) was a British lacrosse player who competed in the 1908 Summer Olympics. He was part of the British team, which won the silver medal. He was found dead of a self-inflicted stab wound to the throat at his house in 1929.

He was long time misidentified as Gustav Bernhard Franck Alexander (b. 20. September 1881 in Chorlton-cum-Hardy, Greater Manchester - d. 5. December 1967 in Little Kimble, Buckinghamshire).
