= Edward Jones (lacrosse) =

British lacrosse player (1881–1951)

Olympic medal record

Representing United Kingdom

Men's Lacrosse
Silver medal – second place	1908 London	Team competition

Edward Percy Jones (July 12, 1881 – November 17, 1951) was a British lacrosse player who competed in the 1908 Summer Olympics. He was part of the British team, which won the silver medal.
