= Reginald Martin =

British lacrosse player

Olympic medal record

Representing United Kingdom

Men's Lacrosse
Silver medal – second place	1908 London	Team competition

Reginald George Warren Martin (June 25, 1887 – January 29, 1981) was a British lacrosse player who competed in the 1908 Summer Olympics. He was part of the British team, which won the silver medal.
