= George Buckland =

British lacrosse player

George Frederick Buckland
- Born: 13 April 1883; Didsbury, Lancashire, England
- Died: 28 January 1937 (aged 53); Timperley, Cheshire, England
- Occupation: Bank clerk
- Known for: Olympic silver medalist - lacrosse

Olympic medal record

Representing United Kingdom

Men's Lacrosse
Silver medal – second place	1908 London	Team competition

George Frederick Buckland (13 April 1883 – 28 January 1937) was a British lacrosse player who competed in the 1908 Summer Olympics. He was part of the British team, which won the silver medal.
