= Alan Noble (field hockey) =

Field hockey player

Personal information
- Born: 9 February 1885 Loughborough, England
- Died: 30 November 1952 (aged 67) Chatswood, New South Wales, Australia

Sport
- Sport: Field hockey
- Position: Left-half
Senior career
Years	Team	Caps	Goals
1905–1907	Huyton	-	-
1907–1908	Formby	-	-
1907–1911	Bebington	-	-
1911–1912	Southport	-	-
National team
Years	Team	Caps	Goals
1908	England	6	-
Medal record
Men's field hockey
Representing Great Britain
Gold medal – first place	1908 London	Team competition

Alan Henry Noble (9 February 1885 – 30 November 1952) was a field hockey player, who won a gold medal with the England team at the 1908 Summer Olympics in London.

== Biography ==
Noble was educated at Derby Public School and played club hockey for Huyton, Formby, Southport, Bebington and Alderley Edge and captained Lancashire at county level.

He emigrated to Australia in order to take a position as secretary for the Union Bank of Australia.
