= Walter Adams (wrestler) =

British wrestler

Personal information
- Nationality: British
- Born: 22 May 1887
- Died: 3 January 1939 (aged 51)

Sport
- Sport: Wrestling

Walter Adams (22 May 1887 – 3 January 1939) was a British wrestler. He competed in the 1908 Summer Olympics.
