= Thomas Swindlehurst =

British tug of war competitor

Olympic medal record

Men's Tug of war
Silver medal – second place	1908 London	Team

Thomas Swindlehurst (21 May 1874 – 15 March 1959) was a British tug of war competitor who competed in the 1908 Summer Olympics. In 1908 he won the silver medal as member of the British team Liverpool Police.
