= Henry Munday =

English physician and schoolmaster

- Born: 1623
- Died: 28 June 1682 (aged 58–59)
- Occupations: Physician and schoolmaster

Henry Munday (1623 – 28 June 1682) was an English physician and schoolmaster.

== Biography ==
Munday was the son of Henry Munday of Henley-on-Thames, and was baptised there on 21 September 1623 (par. reg.) He matriculated at Corpus Christi College, Oxford, on 20 May 1642, and afterwards became postmaster or portionist of Merton College. He graduated B.A. on 2 April 1647. After enjoying, according to Wood, 'some petit employment' during the civil wars and the Commonwealth, Munday was elected head-master of the free grammar school in his native town in 1656. To his work as a teacher he added the practice of medicine, and the school suffered in consequence. His death saved him from the disgrace of dismissal. He died from a fall from his horse as he was returning home from a visit to John, third baron Lovelace, at Hurley, on 28 June 1682, and was buried in the north chancel of Henley Church. His estate was administered for 'Alicia and Marie Mundy, minors.'

He published: 'Βιοχρηστολογία seu Commentarii de Aere Vitali, de Esculeutis, de Potulentis, cum Corollario de Parergis in Victu,' Oxford, 1680, 1685; London, 1681; Frankfort, 1685; Leipzig, 1685; Leyden, 1615.
