= Oswald Carver =

British rower

Olympic medal record

Men's rowing
Bronze medal – third place	1908 London	Eight

Oswald Armitage Carver (2 February 1887 – 7 June 1915) was a British rower who competed in the 1908 Summer Olympics. He died of injuries during the First World War.

Carver was born at Marple, Cheshire, the son of William Oswald Carver and his wife, Katherine Armitage. His father was a cotton goods merchant who had been successful enough to buy Cranage Hall, near Holmes Chapel. Carver was educated at Charterhouse School and Trinity College, Cambridge. He rowed for Cambridge in the Boat Race in 1908. The Cambridge crew made up a boat in the eights which won the bronze medal for Great Britain rowing at the 1908 Summer Olympics.

Carver was a director of the family company which owned Hollins Mill at Marple and had offices and warehouses in central Manchester's "cotton district". Carver was very active in the Scout movement which he introduced to Marple.

During World War I, Carver served with 1/2nd East Lancashire Field Company Royal Engineers. His initial application to serve overseas with the company was rejected by an army medical board at Bury on 3 September 1914 because he was deaf. However, his hearing was rechecked a month later, and by 31 December, he had been promoted to captain responsible for one of the company's four sections. At the beginning of May 1915, the troops left Egypt to go into action at Gallipoli. On 4 June in the Third Battle of Krithia, the Engineers were to follow Territorial Battalions of the Manchester Regiment in an infantry attack on the Turkish positions. Their role was to dig communication trenches back to the original British line and build strong points to be used in case of counterattack. Carver was wounded in the back and evacuated down to 11th Casualty Clearing Station on the landing beach. He died three days later, aged 28.

Carver married Elizabeth "Betty" Hobart, daughter of Robert Thompson Hobart of Tunbridge Wells in 1911. They had children John Hobart Carver, father of Martin Carver and Richard Oswald Hobart Carver. The family lived at The Hollies in Marple.

After Carver's death, Betty Carver married Bernard "Monty" Montgomery of Alamein, also who accepted as children of the family her two sons in their early teens, John and Dick.

== See also ==
- List of Olympians killed in World War I
- List of Cambridge University Boat Race crews
