= Charles Foden =

British tug of war competitor

Personal information
- Nationality: United Kingdom
- Born: 1868
- Died: 14 October 1908 (aged 39–40) Liverpool, England

Sport
- Sport: Athletics
- Event: Tug of War
- Club: Liverpool Police
Medal record
Representing United Kingdom
Tug of War
Olympic Games
Silver medal – second place	1908 London	Tug of War

Charles Foden (1868 – 14 October 1908) was a British tug of war competitor. At the 1908 Summer Olympics, he won a silver medal in the tug of war event as the captain of the British team, Liverpool Police, for whom he worked as a superintendent.

Charles was also a superb marksman and often practised in his spare time with a miniature rifle. On 14 October 1908, his body was discovered on the police athletic grounds in Liverpool with a gunshot wound through the heart, and his rifle was found nearby. An inquest into his death was held, but it could not be determined if he had committed suicide.

At his funeral, six members of the tug-of-war team carried his coffin to its final resting place.
