= William Slade (athlete) =

British tug of war competitor

Olympic medal record

Men's Tug of war
Bronze medal – third place	1908 London	Team

William Slade (9 May 1873 – 30 September 1941) was a British tug of war competitor who competed in the 1908 Summer Olympics. In 1908 he won the bronze medal as member of the British team Metropolitan Police "K" Division.
