= Ernest Ebbage =

British tug of war competitor

Olympic medal record

Men's Tug of war
Bronze medal – third place	1908 London	Team

Ernest Walter Ebbage (1 August 1873 – 2 September 1943) was a British tug of war competitor who competed in the 1908 Summer Olympics. In 1908, he won the bronze medal as a member of the British team from the Metropolitan Police "K" Division.
