= Harvey Wood =

English field hockey player (1885–1958)

Personal information
- Born: 10 April 1885 Beverley, England
- Died: 18 December 1958 (aged 73) Tynemouth, England

Sport
- Sport: Field hockey
- Position: Goalkeeper
Senior career
Years	Team	Caps	Goals
1908–1912	West Bromwich	-	-
National team
Years	Team	Caps	Goals
1908–1908	England	7	-
Medal record
Men's field hockey
Representing Great Britain
Gold medal – first place	1908 London	Team competition

Harvey Jesse Wood (10 April 1885 – 18 December 1958) was a field hockey player who won a gold medal with the England team at the 1908 Summer Olympics in London.

== Biography ==
Wood played club hockey for West Bromwich Hockey Club.

At the 1908 Olympic Games he only conceded six goals in seven games. He was 6 foot 4 inches tall, which was unusual for a hockey goalkeeper.
