= James Harper-Orr =

Scottish cricketer and field hockey player

Personal information
- Born: 18 October 1887 Glasgow, Scotland
- Died: 19 March 1956 (aged 68) Hay Park, Old Polmont, Scotland

Sport
- Sport: Field hockey
- Position: Attacking forward
Senior career
Years	Team	Caps	Goals
1908	Edinburgh	-	-
National team
Years	Team	Caps	Goals
–	Scotland		-
Medal record
Men's field hockey
Representing Great Britain
Bronze medal – third place	1908 London	Team competition

James Harper-Orr (18 October 1878 – 19 March 1956) was a cricketer and field hockey player from Scotland who competed in the 1908 Summer Olympics.

== Biography ==
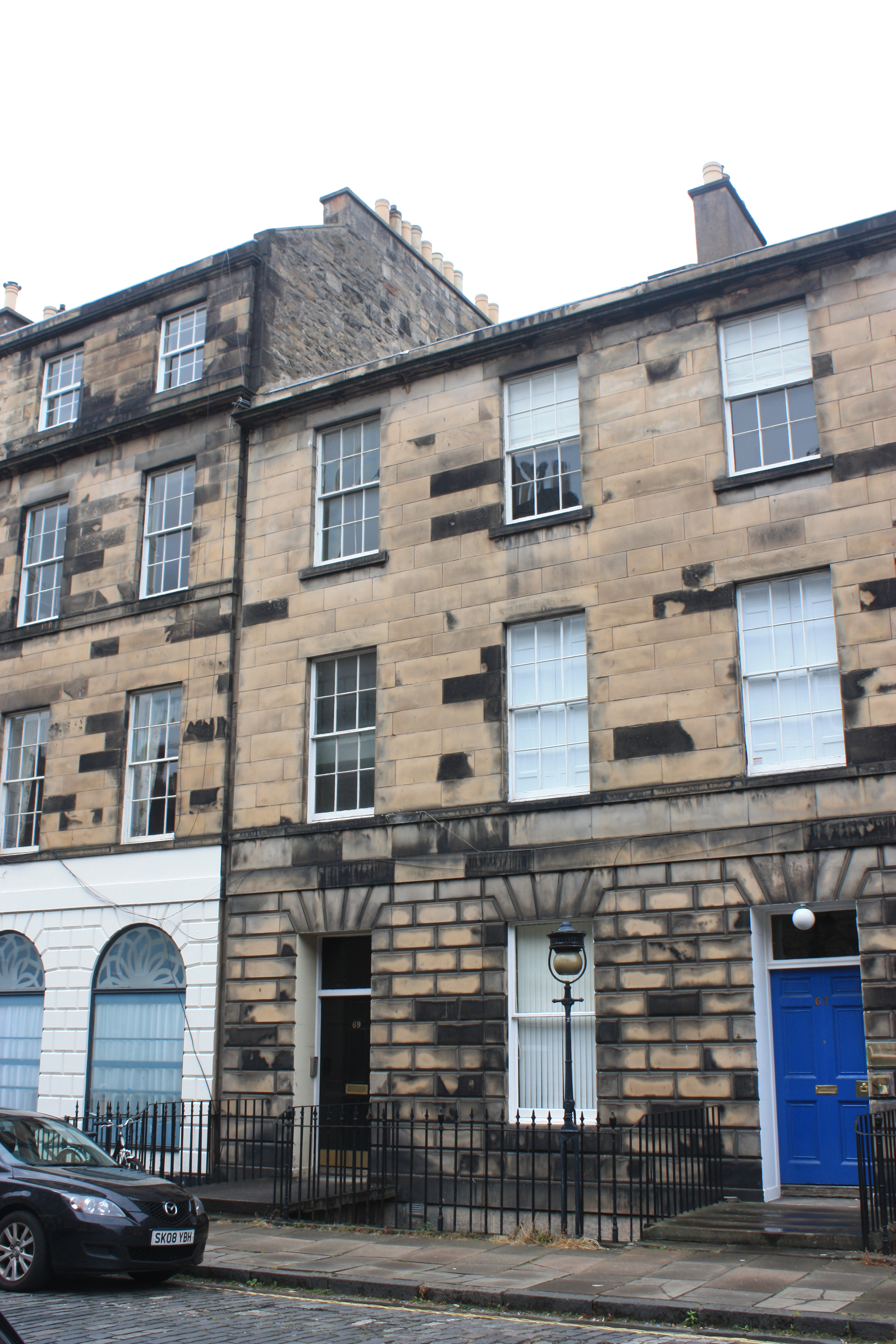
67 Northumberland Street, Edinburgh (blue door on right)

In 1908 Harper-Orr won the bronze medal as member of the Scotland field hockey team.

Harper-Orr played club hockey for Edinburgh and would later captain the Scotland hockey team. He also competed for the Scotland national cricket team in 3 matches during 1912–13, scoring 91 runs over five innings.

In 1911 he is listed as living at 67 Northumberland Street in Edinburgh's Second New Town.
