= Eric Dutton =

British lacrosse player

- Born: 26 July 1883; Chorlton-cum-Hardy, Lancashire, England
- Died: 29 March 1968 (aged 84); North East Cheshire
- Occupation: Bank Clerk
- Known for: Olympic Silver Medalist - Lacrosse

Olympic medal record

Representing United Kingdom

Men's Lacrosse
Silver medal – second place	1908 London	Team competition

Eric Ogden Dutton (26 July 1883 – 29 March 1968) was a British lacrosse player who competed in the 1908 Summer Olympics. He was part of the British team that won the silver medal.
