= Norman Stevenson =

British field hockey player

Personal information
- Born: 25 November 1875 Edinburgh, Scotland
- Died: 21 August 1967 (aged 91) Edinburgh, Scotland

Sport
- Sport: Field hockey
Senior career
Years	Team	Caps	Goals
1905–1908	Carlton Edinburgh	-	-
National team
Years	Team	Caps	Goals
–	Scotland		-
Medal record
Men's field hockey
Representing Great Britain
Bronze medal – third place	1908 London	Team competition

Norman Lang Stevenson (25 November 1875 – 21 August 1967) was a Scottish all-round amateur sportsman. In international terms his greatest sporting achievement was winning a bronze medal for hockey at the 1908 Summer Olympics as a member of the Scotland hockey team. However it was for cricket that he was best known, as a veteran cricket captain for a leading Scottish cricket club. Between 1902 and 1948 he was captain of Edinburgh’s Carlton Cricket Club for a total of 29 seasons, retiring at the age of 73. At every stage of his long captaincy there were years when Carlton won over 80% of their matches. He was “one of the great characters of Scottish cricket” according to The Encyclopedia of Scottish Cricket. Carlton members dubbed him the ‘W.G. Grace’ of Scottish cricket in comparison with England's famously long playing cricketer. Stevenson also wrote a substantial book about the Scottish cricket of his era which has remained in use as a reference book into the 21st century.

== Early life and talent for sport ==
Norman Lang Stevenson was born in 1875, the sixth son among six boys and a younger sister. His father was a prosperous manufacturer and retailer of drapery who died when Stevenson was three years old. The family lived in the Grange district of Edinburgh, where Stevenson was to raise his own family and play much of his cricket at the nearby Carlton Club ground.

By his early teens Stevenson was a promising rugby player while also spending much spare time at Carlton's cricket ground. By the age of 21 he was at Edinburgh University, training as a doctor. He was also building a reputation as a university rugby player, cricketer and sprinter. According to the Carlton Cricket Club website, he trialled for the Scotland rugby team. Then in 1898 a serious skull fracture during a rugby match led him to abandon his rugby career.

After qualifying as a doctor, Stevenson specialised lifelong as a dental surgeon, a workstyle easier to combine with a busy amateur sporting life. In consequence of his medical qualification, Scotland's cricket enthusiasts later sometimes referred to Stevenson simply as ‘The Doctor’.

Stevenson formally joined Edinburgh's Carlton Cricket Club in 1892 and in 1895 was selected for its First XI. He distinguished himself as a fast bowler, then in 1902 became Carlton Captain.

== Hockey career and 1908 Olympic Bronze Medal ==
Stevenson's meteoric hockey career began in 1906 when he started the Carlton Hockey Club with fellow enthusiasts. It rapidly won championships and Stevenson was a prolific scorer, achieving 53 goals in his second season. In consequence, along with two other Carlton players he was selected to play for the Scotland hockey team in the 1908 Olympics, held in London. The hockey nations in these Games, the fourth Olympics in modern times, were Scotland, England, Ireland, Wales, Germany and France. In their first match Scotland beat Germany easily, by four goals to nil, with Scotland on the attack for much of the time. A pass by Stevenson, who played as a forward, assisted one of these goals. But in their second match Scotland were beaten six to one by England, who went on to win the hockey tournament. The Scotland team received a Bronze Medal. Between the 1908 Games and World War I, when much sport was temporarily suspended, Stevenson and the Carlton Hockey Club enjoyed two more very successful seasons.

== Career as cricket captain ==
Stevenson became captain of Edinburgh's Carlton Cricket Club's First XI from 1902 until the suspension of sporting activities during World War I. After the war he recommenced as captain until 1926. Then in 1934, at the age of 59, he was asked to return as captain. He continued until 1948, retiring at the age of 73. Throughout every stage of his 29-year captaincy Carlton enjoyed some very successful cricket seasons. For instance, in 1909 Carlton enjoyed 20 wins, four draws and one loss out of 25 matches. In 1920 it was 22 wins, four draws and one loss and, in 1934, 24 wins, three draws and one loss out of 28 matches.

Regularly in summer Stevenson led cricket tours in the Scottish Highlands, his ‘Northern Tours’. These often included a match against a Royal Household team at Balmoral Castle. A consequence of these matches was an invitation for Carlton to play the Royal Household at Windsor and in 1936 Stevenson was made a Life Member of the Royal Household Cricket Club by King George V, who had watched Stevenson's team playing.

Stevenson's writings convey that he revelled in colourful, signature styles of cricket which captured spectators’ attention. Early in his career, when batting, he would snatch daring, risky extra runs if he sensed indolence in the opposing fielders or signs that they might bungle their throws or catches. At one match in 1897 such eye-catching tactics generated nine runs for Stevenson from a single ball. Primarily a bowler, Stevenson prided himself on a knack for surprisingly often taking a wicket with his very first ball of a match and for uncanny luck with the captains’ coin toss at the start of a game.

In the view of The Encyclopedia of Scottish Cricket, Stevenson was “probably a better captain than he was a player”, since he was not considered for the Scotland team unlike some other major Carlton players of the time.

== Cricket writer ==
Stevenson authored a 310-page book, published in 1946: ‘Play! The Story of the Carlton Cricket Club and a Personal Record of Over 50 Years’ Scottish Cricket. Two-thirds of the book comprises Carlton history during Stevenson's era interspersed with personal memoirs and comments on issues in cricket. The remaining third covers earlier Carlton history, condensed histories of 47 other Scottish cricket clubs, and a review of notable contemporary cricketers from other Scottish clubs.

In the view of The Encyclopedia of Scottish Cricket, Stevenson was “a great writer on the game”. His book has remained in use as a reference source by cricket writers into the 21st century. One distinctive feature is the book's compilation of detailed facts and figures about matches and excerpts from newspaper reports to record an era in Scottish cricket which otherwise is not well covered. Another feature is colourful or humorous eye-witness anecdotes from games in which Stevenson played. Some of these concern internationally famous cricketers whom Stevenson engaged to play on occasion for Carlton, like the England Team bowler S.F. Barnes or the Australia Team bowler E.A. McDonald.

== Other contributions to cricket ==
Stevenson was “an indefatigable worker for cricket”, according to The Encyclopedia of Scottish Cricket, through the ways he promoted the popularity of the game in Scotland.

One element in the latter was that Stevenson organised cricket teams with a mix of well-known and not-so-experienced players to put on matches in out-of-the-way parts of Scotland to stimulate local interest in cricket. In 1933 this evolved into the Crustaceans Club, whose team he captained.

Stevenson purposefully drew to Carlton's cricket ground what he called “cricket personalities” – famous or colourful cricketers who would attract many spectators. He was able repeatedly to persuade internationally famous cricketers like S.F. Barnes, E.A. McDonald, J.W.H.T. Douglas and Harold Larwood to visit Scotland to play for or against a Carlton or Crustaceans team (though an injury precluded Larwood's visit). Stevenson's friendship with spin bowler S.F. Barnes brought huge crowds to Carlton's ground to watch the latter.

Yet another element was Stevenson's attention, when club secretary, to promoting enjoyment and conviviality among spectators and players alike. In the 1920s he successfully utilised sets of welcoming stewards and free refreshments along with free entry to matches to draw people to watch cricket – the “Tea Offensive” he called it. Stevenson organised a series of imaginative “Grand Fancy Fair and Carnival” events to raise funds to buy Carlton's leafy, much-admired cricket ground in Grange, Edinburgh with its view of Edinburgh's landmark hill, Arthur's Seat. “Cricket with trimmings” was one newspaper's epithet for the pleasant cricket-watching ambience which he promoted. During his annual cricket tours in the Scottish Highlands, Stevenson would systematically promote exuberant excursions for his team and their entourage. In between matches, they would climb mountains and picnic beside celebrated lochs and waterfalls – “as much sight-seeing as possible”, he wrote. A contemporary illustrated description of the 1927 Northern Tour and Stevenson's characteristic Scottish style of joie de vivre is preserved on the Carlton Club website. The latter's ‘Tales from the Archives’ section includes anecdotes and photographs featuring Norman Lang Stevenson.

== Personal life ==
Norman Lang Stevenson married Ethel Crawford in 1905. Together they reared a family of seven children – six girls and one boy – at 7 Strathearn Road in Grange, Edinburgh. Later they moved to 7 Alva Street, Edinburgh where Stevenson’s dental surgeries were already located. He died on 21 August 1967 and is buried in Grange Cemetery, Edinburgh.
