= Charles Tatham (tennis) =

British real tennis player

Personal information
- Born: 5 August 1864 Ryburgh, England
- Died: 27 February 1925 (aged 60) London, England

Sport
- Sport: Jeu de paume

Charles Tatham (5 August 1864 – 27 February 1925) was a British real tennis player who competed in the jeu de paume tournament at the 1908 Summer Olympics.
