= Hubert Ramsey =

British lacrosse player

Hubert Walter Ramsey
- Born: 3 October 1874; Tottenham, Middlesex, England
- Died: 8 February 1968 (aged 93); Battle, Sussex, England
- Occupation: Stock Broker
- Known for: Olympic Silver Medalist - Lacrosse

Olympic medal record

Representing United Kingdom

Men's Lacrosse
Silver medal – second place	1908 London	Team competition

Hubert Walter Ramsey (3 October 1874 – 8 February 1968) was a British lacrosse player who competed in the 1908 Summer Olympics. He was part of the British team, which won the silver medal.
