= Edgar Page =

English field hockey player and cricketer

Personal information
- Born: 31 December 1884 Wolverhampton, England
- Died: 12 May 1956 (aged 71) Wolverhampton, England

Sport
- Sport: Field hockey
- Position: Centre-half
Senior career
Years	Team	Caps	Goals
1901–1911	Wolverhampton	-	-
1912–1913	Penn Fields	-	-
National team
Years	Team	Caps	Goals
1907–1920	England	15	-
Medal record
Men's field hockey
Representing Great Britain
Gold medal – first place	1908 London	Team competition

Edgar Wells Page (31 December 1884 – 12 May 1956) was an English former field hockey player, who won a gold medal with the Great Britain team at the 1908 Summer Olympics in London.

== Biography ==
Page was educated at Repton School and played club hockey for Wolverhampton and won 15 caps for England. He represented Staffordshire at county level.

He also played cricket for Staffordshire in the Minor Counties Championship from 1905 to 1927, as well as playing a single first-class match for the Minor Counties against HDG Leveson-Gower's XI in 1924.

During World War I he won the Military Cross.

After his playing days he continued his career as a chartered accountant.
