= John Yate Robinson =

English field hockey player

John Robinson
Personal information
- Born: 6 August 1885 Catford, England
- Died: 23 August 1916 (aged 31) Roehampton, England

Sport
- Sport: Field hockey
- Position: Half-back
Senior career
Years	Team	Caps	Goals
1906–1909	Cambridge University	-	-
1910	Sherborne	-	-
National team
Years	Team	Caps	Goals
1907–1911	England	9	-
Medal record
Men's field hockey
Representing Great Britain
Gold medal – first place	1908 London	Team competition

John Yate Robinson MC (6 August 1885 – 23 August 1916) was a field hockey player, who won a gold medal with the English team at the 1908 Summer Olympics in London.

== Biography ==
Born in Catford, son of clergyman the Reverend Edward Cecil Robinson and his wife Edith Isabella, he was educated at Radley College and Merton College, Oxford, where he was awarded his MA in 1912. He was on the Oxford University hockey team from 1905 through 1909, eventually becoming captain. He became a teacher, serving as master at Sherborne School and in Broadstairs, Kent.

He played nine times for England. After Oxford, he played for Sherborne at club level and Dorset at county level.

Robinson became a captain in the North Staffordshire Regiment in 1914, and served at Gallipoli and in Mesopotamia. He was mentioned in despatches and awarded the Military Cross. He died aged 31 at Roehampton, from wounds he had received in action at El Hannah in Mesopotamia. He was buried at Great Malvern Cemetery, Worcestershire.

== See also ==
- List of Olympians killed in World War I

== Notes ==
- Radley College Register 1847–1962, 1965.
