= Gordon Orchardson =

Scottish field hockey player

Personal information
- Born: 1885 Thanet, England
- Died: 1969 (aged 83–84) Nairobi, Kenya

Sport
- Sport: Field hockey
Senior career
Years	Team	Caps	Goals
1905–1908	Cartha Glasgow	-	-
National team
Years	Team	Caps	Goals
–	Scotland		-
Medal record
Men's field hockey
Representing Great Britain
Bronze medal – third place	1908 London	Team competition

Gordon Quiller Orchardson (1885 – 1969) was a Scottish field hockey player who competed in the 1908 Summer Olympics. In 1908 he won the bronze medal as member of the Scotland team.

== Biography ==
Orchardson was born in Thanet, England, the son of Sir William Quiller Orchardson (a Sottish-born painter).

He played club cricket for Cartha in Glasgow.

With his brother Ian, Orchardson emigrated to Kericho in Kenya to farm.
