= Liverpool City Police =

Liverpool City Police was the police force operating in the city of Liverpool, England. Established in 1836 by the Liverpool Watch Committee as Liverpool Constabulary, it was renamed in 1880 after Liverpool was granted city status.

In 1967, the force merged with Bootle Borough Police to create the Liverpool and Bootle Constabulary.
