= Boxing at the 1950 British Empire Games =

- Venue: Auckland Town Hall (Great Hall)
- Location: Auckland, New Zealand
- Dates: 4 – 11 February 1950

Boxing at the 1950 British Empire Games was the fourth appearance of the Boxing at the Commonwealth Games. The events were held in Auckland, New Zealand, and featured contests in eight weight classes.

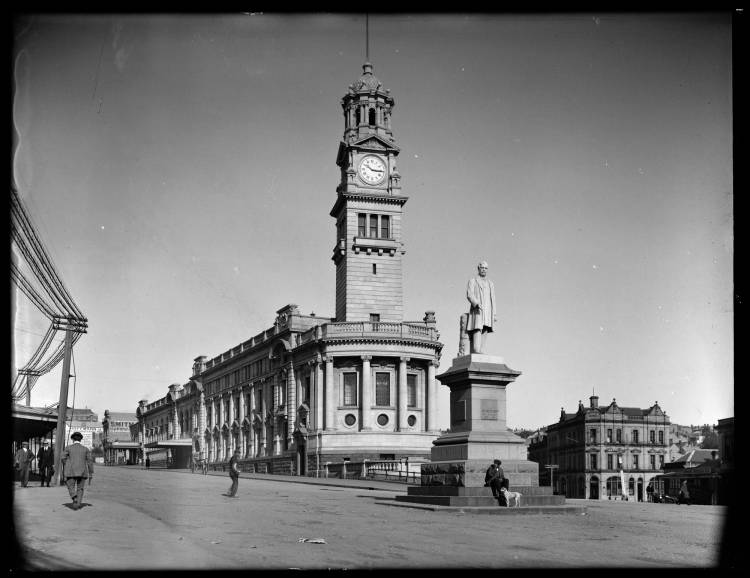
The Auckland Town Hall was the venue for the boxing

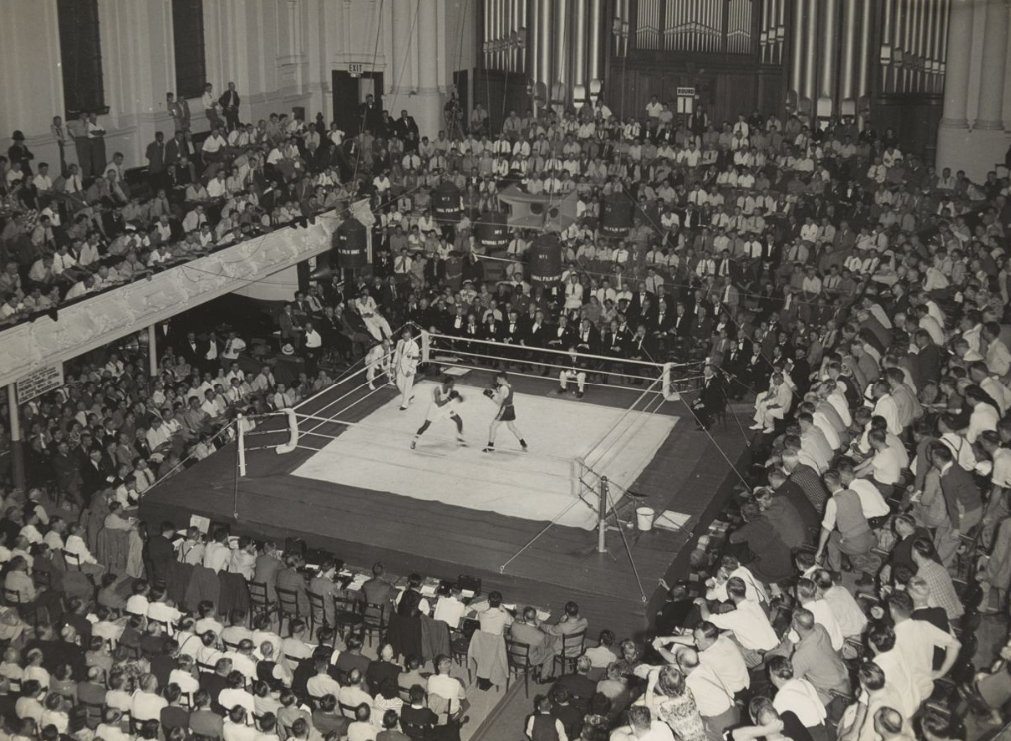
The bantamweight final between van Rensburg and Perera, Auckland Libraries Heritage Collections

The boxing events were held in the Great Hall of the Auckland Town Hall, which had a capacity of 3,000 for the events.

England topped the boxing medal table by virtue of winning three gold medals.

== Medal table ==
* Host nation (New Zealand)

Medals won by nation with totals, ranked by number of golds—sortable
Rank	Nation	Gold	Silver	Bronze	Total
1	England (ENG)	3	0	1	4
2	South Africa (SAF)	2	0	1	3
3	Scotland (SCO)	2	0	0	2
4	New Zealand (NZL)*	1	2	1	4
5	Australia (AUS)	0	3	1	4
6	Ceylon (CEY)	0	2	1	3
7	Southern Rhodesia (SRH)	0	1	0	1
8	Canada (CAN)	0	0	2	2
Totals (8 entries)		8	8	7	23

=== Medallists ===
Event	Gold	Silver	Bronze
Flyweight	Hugh Riley (SCO)	(Dominion of Ceylon) K. Edwin (CEY)	(South Africa) Marcus Temple (SAF)
Bantamweight	(South Africa) Johnny van Rensburg (SAF)	(Dominion of Ceylon) Albert Perera (CEY)	Len Walters (CAN)
Featherweight	Henry Gilliland (SCO)	(Southern Rhodesia) Andy Verceuil (RHO)	Peter Brander (ENG)
Lightweight	Ronnie Latham (ENG)	Billy Barber (AUS)	Jim Barnden (NZL)
Welterweight	Terry Ratcliffe (ENG)	Bill Seewitz (AUS)	(Dominion of Ceylon) Alex Obeysekere (CEY)
Middleweight	(South Africa) Theunis van Schalkwyk (SAF)	James Beal (NZL)	Bill Pinkus (CAN)
Light heavyweight	Don Scott (ENG)	Chris Rollinson (NZL)	Jack Taylor (AUS)
Heavyweight	Frank Creagh (NZL)	Sid Cousins (AUS)	none awarded

== Results ==
=== First round ===
Weight	Winner	Loser	Score
Flyweight 51kg
	(Scotland) Hugh Riley	bye	
	(Dominion of Ceylon) K. Edwin	(New Zealand) Bert Maddern	
	(South Africa) Marcus Temple	(Canada) Ron Muir	
	(Australia) Ron Gower	bye	
Bantamweight 54kg
	(South Africa) Johnny van Rensburg	(Scotland) Tommy Miller	
	(Dominion of Ceylon) Albert Perera	bye	
	(Canada) Len Walters	(New Zealand) Robert Broadhurst	
	(Australia) Merton Barrett	bye	
Featherweight 57kg
	(Scotland) Henry Gilliland	bye	
	(Southern Rhodesia) Andy Verceuil	(Canada) Frank White	
	(England) Peter Brander	(New Zealand) William Paterson	
	(Australia) Anthony James Fisher	(South Africa) J. Pretorius	
Lightweight 60kg
	(England) Ronnie Latham	(Dominion of Ceylon) Eddie Grey	
	(Australia) Billy Barber	(South Africa) D. G. Shepherd	
	(New Zealand) Jim Barnden	(Southern Rhodesia) E. L. King	
	(Canada) Eddie Haddad	bye	
Welterweight 67kg
	(England) Terry Ratcliffe	(Canada) Johnny Ravenda	points
	(Australia) Bill Seewitz	bye	
	(Dominion of Ceylon) Alex Obeysekere	bye	
	(New Zealand) Jimmy McIvor	(Southern Rhodesia) Johannes Small	points
Middleweight 75kg
	(South Africa) Theunis van Schalkwyk	bye	
	(New Zealand) James Beal	bye	
	(Canada) Bill Pinkus	bye	
Light heavyweight 81kg
	(England) Don Scott	bye	
	(New Zealand) Chris Rollinson	bye	
	(Australia) Jack Taylor	bye	
Heavyweight 91kg
	(New Zealand) Frank Creagh	bye	
	(Australia) Sid Cousins	bye	

=== Semi-finals ===
Weight	Winner	Loser	Score
Flyweight
	Riley	Gower	points
	Edwin	Temple	points
Bantamweight
	van Rensburg	Walters	points
	Perera	Barrett	points
Featherweight
	Gilliland	Brander	points
	Verceuil	Fisher	stopped 2nd
Lightweight
	Latham	Haddad	points
	Barber	Barnden	failed weight
Welterweight
	Ratcliffe	McIvor	points
	Seewitz	Obeysekere	stopped 3rd
Middleweight
	van Schalkwyk	Pinkus	points
	Beal	bye	
Light heavyweight
	Scott	Taylor	stopped 2nd
	Rollinson	bye	
Heavyweight
	Creagh	bye	
	Cousins	bye	

=== Bronze medal ===
Weight	Winner	Loser	Score
Flyweight	Temple	Gower	
Bantamweight	Walters	Barrett	w/o
Featherweight	Brander	Fisher	
Lightweight	Barnden	Haddad	
Welterweight	Obeysekere	McIvor	w/o
Middleweight	Pinkus	no opponent	
Light heavyweight	Taylor	no opponent	

=== Finals ===
Weight	Winner	Loser	Score
Flyweight	Riley	Edwin	points
Bantamweight	van Rensburg	Perera	points
Featherweight	Gilliland	Verceuil	points
Lightweight	Latham	Barber	points
Welterweight	Ratcliffe	Seewitz	points
Middleweight	van Schalkwyk	Beal	points
Light heavyweight	Scott	Rollinson	points
Heavyweight	Creagh	Cousins	points
