= Charnley =

Charnley is a surname. Notable people with the surname include:

- Bill Charnley, English footballer
- Bryan Charnley (1949–1991), English artist
- Chic Charnley (born 1963), Scottish association football (soccer) player
- Dave Charnley (1935–2012), English lightweight boxer
- Donn Charnley (born 1928), American politician
- Irene Charnley (born 1960), South African businesswoman
- John Charnley (1911–1982), English orthopaedic surgeon
- Josh Charnley (born 1991), English rugby league footballer
- Ray Charnley (1935–2009), English association football (soccer) player
- Sam Charnley (1902–1977), Scottish association football (soccer) player

== See also ==
- Hip prosthesis zones, including the DeLee and Charnley system
