= Boxing at the 1908 Summer Olympics – Bantamweight =

Boxing competitions

Men's bantamweight boxing at the Games of the IV Olympiad
- Date: October 27, 1908
- Competitors: 6 from 2 nations

Medalists
1st place, gold medalist(s)		Henry Thomas	Great Britain
2nd place, silver medalist(s)		John Condon	Great Britain
3rd place, bronze medalist(s)		William Webb	Great Britain

The bantamweight was one of five boxing weight classes contested on the boxing at the 1908 Summer Olympics programme. Like all other boxing events, it was open only to men. The boxing competitions were all held on October 27. The bantamweight was the lightest class, allowing boxers of up to 116 pounds (52.6 kg). Six boxers from two nations competed. Each NOC could enter up to 12 boxers. France entered 3 boxers, 2 of whom withdrew; Great Britain entered 5 boxers.

== Competition format ==
There were three rounds in each bout, with the first two rounds being three minutes long and the last one going four minutes. Two judges scored the match, giving 5 points to the better boxer in each of the first two rounds and 7 to the better boxer in the third round. Marks were given to the other boxer in proportion to how well he did compared to the better. If the judges were not agreed on a winner at the end of the bout, the referee could either choose the winner or order a fourth round.

== Results ==
=== Bracket ===
Quarterfinals; October 27		Semifinals; October 27		Final; October 27
John Condon (GBR)	KO3
Pierre Mazior (FRA)	L	John Condon (GBR)	2
William Webb (GBR)	2	William Webb (GBR)	0
Henry Perry (GBR)	1			John Condon (GBR)	0
Henry Thomas (GBR)	2			Henry Thomas (GBR)	2
Frank McGurk (GBR)	0	Henry Thomas (GBR)	–
		Bye	–

Did not start: R. Clément and A. Viez of France.

=== Quarterfinals ===
Condon won by knockout in the third round against the only non-British competitor in the bantamweight. McGurk came out well against Thomas, but Thomas finished stronger. The bout between Webb and Perry was the tightest, with Webb's win coming through the referee's decision after the two judges deadlocked.

=== Semifinals ===
Thomas had been seeded into a bye for the round. Webb and Condon had a tight bout, with Condon winning narrowly.

=== Final ===
The two boxers fought a physical bout up close, in which Thomas fared better.

== Standings ==
Rank	Boxer	Nation
1st place, gold medalist(s)	Henry Thomas	Great Britain
2nd place, silver medalist(s)	John Condon	Great Britain
3rd place, bronze medalist(s)	William Webb	Great Britain
4	Pierre Mazior	France
4	Frank McGurk	Great Britain
4	Henry Perry	Great Britain

== Sources ==
- Official Report of the Games of the IV Olympiad (1908).
- De Wael, Herman. Herman's Full Olympians: "Boxing 1908". Accessed 8 April 2006. Available electronically at.
