= England Boxing National Amateur Championships Featherweight Champions =

English Boxing competition

England Boxing National Amateur Championships Featherweight Champions (U57.5kg)
- Status: active
- Genre: Boxing
- Inaugurated: 1881
- Organiser: England Boxing

The England Boxing National Amateur Championships Featherweight Championship formerly known as the ABA Championships is the primary English amateur boxing championship. It had previously been contested by all the nations of the United Kingdom.

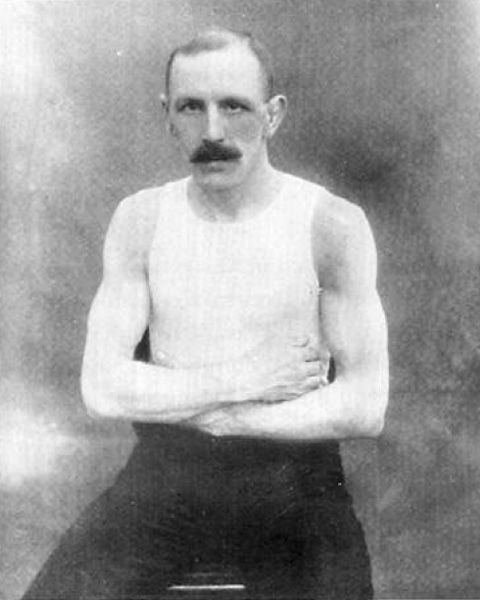
Richard Gunn, three times champion from 1894 to 1896

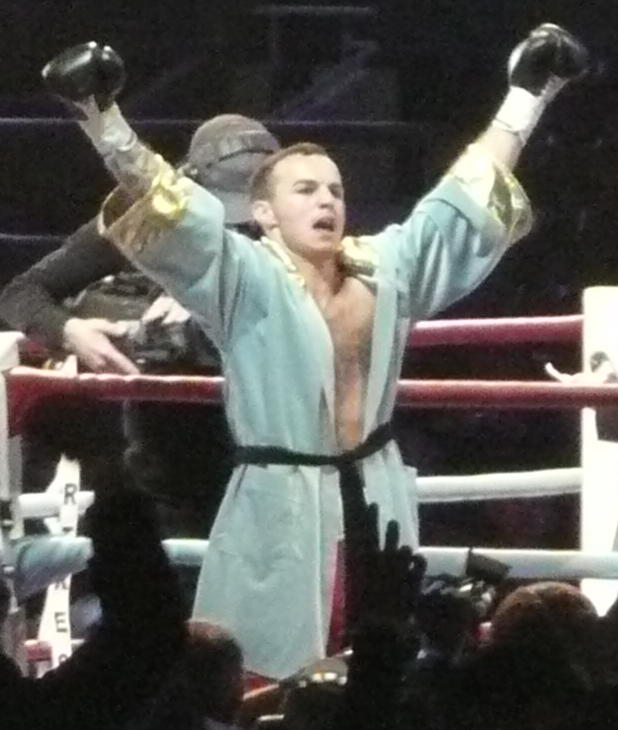
Kevin Mitchell won the title in 2003

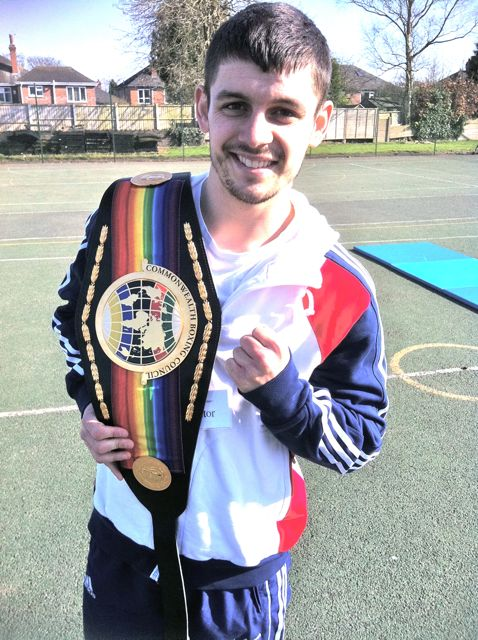
Stephen Smith won the title twice in 2006 and 2007

== History ==
The featherweight division was inaugurated in 1881 and is currently contested in the under-57.5 Kg weight division. The championships are highly regarded in the boxing world and seen as the most prestigious national amateur championships.

== Past winners ==
Year	Winner	Club
1881	Tom Hill	(Birmingham ABC)
1882	Tom Hill	(Birmingham ABC)
1883	Tom Hill	(Birmingham ABC)
1884	E. Hutchings	(19th Middlesex Rifles)
1885	James Pennell	(Manchester ABC)
1886	Thomas J. McNeil	(Cestus ABC)
1887	James Pennell	(Manchester ABC)
1888	J. E. Taylor	(St James ABC)
1889	Thomas J. McNeil	(Polytechnic Boxing Club)
1890	George Frederick Belsey	(Polytechnic Boxing Club)
1891	Fred Curtis	(Stanhope ABC)
1892	Fred Curtis	(Stanhope ABC)
1893	Tom F. Davidson	(Stanhope ABC)
1894	Richard Gunn	(Vandom ABC)
1895	Richard Gunn	(Lynn & Vandom ABC)
1896	Richard Gunn	(Lynn ABC)
1897	Natty Smith	(Anchor ABC)
1898	Percy A. Lunn	(Belsize ABC)
1899	John L. Scholes	(Athenaeum Club, Toronto, Canada)
1900	Dick Lee	(Stanhope ABC)
1901	Chris G. Clarke	(Lynn ABC)
1902	Chris G. Clarke	(Lynn ABC)
1903	James Godfrey	(Columbia ABC)
1904	Charley Morris	(Polytechnic Boxing Club)
1905	Harry Holmes	(17th Middlesex Rifles)
1906	Arthur J. Miner	(Lynn ABC)
1907	Charley Morris	(Polytechnic Boxing Club)
1908	Tom Ringer	(Lynn ABC)
1909	Alex H. Lambert	(Belgrave Harriers ABC)
1910	Con Houghton	(Northampton Institute ABC)
1911	Harry Bowers	(St. Pancras ABC)
1912	George Baker	(Hendon ABC)
1913	George Baker	(Hendon ABC)
1914	George Baker	(Hendon ABC)
1915-18	Not held	
1919	George Baker	(Hendon ABC)
1920	John Fleming	(United Scottish BC)
1921	George Baker	(Polytechnic Boxing Club)
1922	Ernie Swash	(Clapton Federation ABC)
1923	Ernie Swash	(Clapton Federation ABC)
1924	Arthur Beavis	(Polytechnic Boxing Club)
1925	Arthur Beavis	(Polytechnic Boxing Club)
1926	Ralph Minshull	(South Africa)
1927	Fred Webster	(St. Pancras ABC)
1928	Freddie Meachem	(Civil Service ABC)
1929	Freddie Meachem	(Civil Service ABC)
1930	Jack W. Duffield	(Lynn ABC)
1931	Benny Caplan	(Polytechnic Boxing Club)
1932	Harry Mizler	(Oxford & St Georges ABC)
1933	Johnny C. Walters	(Polytechnic Boxing Club)
1934	Jackie Treadaway	(Battersea & Shexgar ABC)
1935	Edward Ryan	(Lynn ABC)
1936	Jackie Treadaway	(Battersea & Shexgar ABC)
1937	Alfred Harper	(Aston ABC)
1938	Cyril Gallie	(Cardiff Gas BC)
1939	Cyril Gallie	(Cardiff Gas BC)
1940-42	Not held	
1943	Douglas L. Sullivan	(CAV AA and Slough Centre ABC)
1944	Douglas L. Sullivan	(Slough Centre ABC)
1945	John Carter	(Royal Air Force)
1946	Peter Brander	(Slough Centre ABC)
1947	Selwyn Evans	(Newbridge ABC)
1948	Peter Brander	(Slough Centre ABC)
1949	Henry Gilliland	(Kilmarnock BC)
1950	Peter Brander	(Slough Centre ABC)
1951	Jim Travers	(Landsowne BC)
1952	Percy Lewis	(Royal Air Force)
1953	Percy Lewis	(Oxford YMCA ABC)
1954	Dave Charnley	(Fitzroy Lodge ABC)
1955	Tommy Nicholls	(Sankeys ABC)
1956	Tommy Nicholls	(Sankeys ABC)
1957	Malcolm Collins	(Melingriffith ABC)
1958	Malcolm Collins	(Melingriffith ABC)
1959	George Judge	(NB Loco ABC)
1960	Phil Lundgren	(Fisher ABC)
1961	Peter Cheevers	(Fisher ABC)
1962	Billy Wilson	(Monteagle ABC)
1963	Anthony Riley	(Rootes ABC)
1964	Ronald Smith	(Fisher ABC)
1965	Ken Buchanan	(Sparta ABC)
1966	Hugh Baxter	(Kelvin ABC)
1967	Ken Cooper	(Kyrle Hall ABC)
1968	Johnny Cheshire	(Repton ABC)
1969	Alan Richardson	(White Rose ABC)
1970	Robin Polak	(Clifton ABC)
1971	Tommy Wright	(Plant Works ABC)
1972	Kirkland Laing	(Clifton ABC)
1973	John Lynch	(Kensington ABC)
1974	George Gilbody	(Golden Gloves ABC)
1975	Ricky Beaumont	(Hull Fish Trades ABC)
1976	Pat Cowdell	(Warley ABC)
1977	Pat Cowdell	(Warley ABC)
1978	Moss O'Brien	(Repton ABC)
1979	Peter Hanlon	(Gloucester ABC)
1980	Mohammed Hanif	(Stockton ABC)
1981	Peter Hanlon	(Gloucester ABC)
1982	Herman Henry	(St Pancras ABC)
1983	Peter Bradley	(Holyrood ABC)
1984	Kevin Taylor	(Middleton & Rochdale ABC)
1985	Floyd Havard	(Penyrheol BC)
1986	Paul Hodkinson	(Kirkby ABC)
1987	Peter English	(Gallagher Boys ABC)
1988	David Anderson	(Bellahouston BC)
1989	Peter Richardson	(Philip Thomas School of Boxing ABC)
1990	Brian Carr	(Auchengeich BC)
1991	Jon Jo Irwin	(Tom Hill ABC)
1992	Alan Temple	(Hartlepool Boys Welfare ABC)
1993	Jason Cook	(Maesteg BC)
1994	Dean Pithie	(Willenhall ABC)
1995	David Burrows	(Bench Hill ABC)
1996	Anthony Mulholland	(Gemini ABC)
1997	Steven Bell	(Luverlite ABC)
1998	Dazzo Williams	(Army)
1999	Scott Miller	(St. Paul's ABC)
2000	Henry Castle	(Salisbury City ABC)
2001	Steven Bell	(Nichol's Police ABC)
2002	David Mulholland	(Salisbury ABC)
2003	Kevin Mitchell	(West Ham ABC)
2004	David Mulholland	(Salisbury ABC)
2005	Nick McDonald	(Vauxhall Motors ABC)
2006	Stephen Smith	(Rotunda ABC)
2007	Stephen Smith	(Rotunda ABC)
2008	Bradley Evans	(Steven ABC)
2009	Iain Weaver	(Golden Ring)
2010	Martin Ward	(Repton)
2011	Mitchell Smith	(Welwyn Garden City ABC)
2012	Qais Ashfaq	(Meanwood ABC)
2013	Reece Bellotti	(South Oxhey ABC)
2014	Qais Ashfaq	(Burmantofts)
2015	Calum French	(Birtley)
2016	Peter McGrail	(Everton Red Triangle)
2017	Louie Lynn	(Nemesis)
2018	Brad Strand	(Everton Red Triangle)
2019	Ibrahim Nadim	(Bury)
2020	cancelled due to COVID 19.	
2021	Billy Adams	(Dagenham)
2022	Jack Dryden	(Birtley)
2023	Jack Dryden	(Birtley)
2024	Leo Wood	(Ropes & Glory)
2025	Connor Mitchell	(Thurrock)
2026	Yasin Saddiq	(Barton Hill)
