= Boxing at the 1954 British Empire and Commonwealth Games =

- Venue: Vancouver Forum
- Location: Vancouver, Canada
- Dates: 30 July – 7 August 1954

Boxing at the 1954 British Empire and Commonwealth Games was the fifth appearance of the Boxing at the Commonwealth Games. The events were held in Vancouver, Canada, and featured contests in ten weight classes.

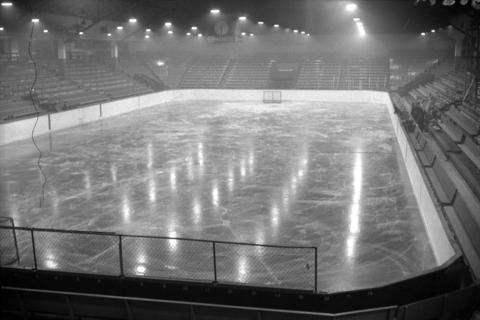
The Exhibition Forum was the venue for the boxing

The boxing events were held in the Vancouver Forum. South Africa topped the boxing medal table by virtue of winning three gold medals.

In the light-middleweight category Bruce Wells won his semi-final against Maurice Tuck but after a clash of heads in the bout he was declared unfit for the final. Tuck was also declared unfit to continue resulting in Freddy Wright progressing to the final instead.

== Medal table ==
* Host nation (Canada)

Medals won by nation with totals, ranked by number of golds—sortable
Rank	Nation	Gold	Silver	Bronze	Total
1	South Africa (SAF)	3	0	2	5
2	Canada (CAN)*	2	1	2	5
3	Scotland (SCO)	2	1	0	3
4	England (ENG)	2	0	2	4
5	Southern Rhodesia (SRH)	1	2	0	3
6	Northern Rhodesia (NRH)	0	3	0	3
7	Australia (AUS)	0	2	3	5
8	Wales (WAL)	0	1	0	1
9	Nigeria (NGR)	0	0	1	1
10	New Zealand (NZL)	0	0	0	0
10	Pakistan (PAK)	0	0	0	0
10	Trinidad and Tobago (TRI)	0	0	0	0
Totals (12 entries)		10	10	10	30

== Medallists ==
Event	Gold	Silver	Bronze
Flyweight	Dick Currie (SCO)	Abe Bekker (NRH)	Warner Batchelor (AUS)
Bantamweight	John Smillie (SCO)	Gordon Smith (SRH)	Abubakar Idi Garuba (NGR)
Featherweight	Leonard Leisching (SAF)	Malcolm Collins (WAL)	Dave Charnley (ENG)
Lightweight	Piet van Staden (SRH)	Frank McQuillan (SCO)	Brian Cahill (AUS)
Light Welterweight	Mickey Bergin (CAN)	Aubrey Harris (SRH)	Des Duguid (AUS)
Welterweight	Nicholas Gargano (ENG)	Rodney Litzow (AUS)	Hendrik van der Linde (SAF)
Light Middleweight	Wilf Greaves (CAN)	Freddy Wright (NRH)	Bruce Wells (ENG)
Middleweight	Jan Adriaan van der Kolff (SAF)	Arthur Crawford (NRH)	Marcel Piau (CAN)
Light Heavyweight	Piet van Vuuren (SAF)	Tony Madigan (AUS)	Bill Misselbrook (CAN)
Heavyweight	Brian Harper (ENG)	Gerry Buchanan (CAN)	George Jenkins (SAF)

== Results ==
=== First round ===
Weight	Winner	Loser	Score
Flyweight 51kg
	(Scotland) Dick Currie	bye	
	(Northern Rhodesia) Abe Bekker	(Nigeria) Adu Garuba	points
	(Australia) Warner Batchelor	(Pakistan) Ahmed Shah	points
	(Canada) Gerry Boucher	bye	
Bantamweight 54kg
	(Scotland) John Smillie	(South Africa) Dennis Kennedy	points
	(Southern Rhodesia) Gordon Smith	bye	
	(Nigeria) Abubakar Idi Garuba	bye	
	(New Zealand) Edwin Stockley	bye	
Featherweight 57kg
	(South Africa) Leonard Leisching	(Canada) Bud Palmer	points
	(Wales) Malcolm Collins	bye	
	(England) Dave Charnley	(Australia) Gil Durey	TKO 3
	(Trinidad and Tobago) Hollis Wilson	bye	
Lightweight 60kg
	(Southern Rhodesia) Piet van Staden	(Canada) Clayton Kenny	points
	(Scotland) Frank McQuillan	bye	
	(Australia) Brian Cahill	bye	
	(South Africa) Mickey Pretorius	(England) George Whelan	disq
Light-welterweight 63.5kg
	(Canada) Mickey Bergin	bye	
	(Southern Rhodesia) Aubrey Harris	bye	
	(Australia) Des Duguid	bye	
	(New Zealand) Alan Scaife	bye	
Welterweight 67kg
	(England) Nicholas Gargano	(New Zealand) Mike Hannah	
	(Australia) Rodney Litzow	bye	
	(South Africa) Hendrik van der Linde	(Canada) Sonny Forbes	
	(Northern Rhodesia) Chris Vivier	bye	
Light-middleweight 71kg
	(Canada) Wilf Greaves	(Australia) Gwynfryn Evans	
	(Northern Rhodesia) Freddy Wright	bye	
	(England) Bruce Wells	bye	
	(New Zealand) Maurice Tuck	bye	
Middleweight 75kg
	(South Africa) Jan Adriaan van der Kolff	bye	
	(Northern Rhodesia) Arthur Crawford	bye	
	(Canada) Marcel Piau	bye	
Light heavyweight 81kg
	(South Africa) Piet van Vuuren	bye	
	(Australia) Tony Madigan	bye	
	(Canada) Bill Misselbrook	bye	
Heavyweight 91kg
	(England) Brian Harper	bye	
	(Canada) Gerry Buchanan	bye	
	(South Africa) George Jenkins	bye	
	(Australia) Steve Zoranich	bye	

=== Semi-finals ===
Weight	Winner	Loser	Score
Flyweight
	Currie	Boucher	points
	Bekker	Batchelor	points
Bantamweight
	Smillie	Stockley	TKO 2
	Smith	Idi Garuba	points
Featherweight
	Leisching	Charnley	points
	Collins	Wilson	TKO 2
Lightweight
	van Staden	Pretorius	TKO 3
	McQuillan	Cahill	points
Light-welterweight
	Bergin	Duguid	points
	Harris	Scaife	points
Welterweight
	Gargano	van der Linde	points
	Litzow	Vivier	points
Light-middleweight
	Greaves	Wright+	NC
	Wells+	Tuck	TKOI 1
Middleweight
	van der Kolff	bye	
	Crawford	Piau	points
Light heavyweight
	van Vuuren	bye	
	Madigan	Misselbrook	TKO 1
Heavyweight
	Harper	Zoranich	KO 1
	Buchanan	Jenkins	TKO 2

=== Bronze medal ===
Weight	Winner	Loser	Score
Flyweight	Batchelor	Boucher	
Bantamweight	Idi Garuba	Stockley	
Featherweight	Charnley	Wilson	
Lightweight	Cahill	Pretorius	
Light-welterweight	Duguid	Scaife	
Welterweight	van der Linde	Vivier	
Light-middleweight	Wells	Tuck	w/o
Middleweight	Piau	no opponent	
Light heavyweight	Misselbrook	no opponent	
Heavyweight	Jenkins	Zoranich	

=== Finals ===
Weight	Winner	Loser	Score
Flyweight	Currie	Bekker	points
Bantamweight	Smillie	Smith	points
Featherweight	Leisching	Collins	points
Lightweight	van Staden	McQuillan	points
Light-welterweight	Bergin	Harris	points
Welterweight	Gargano	Litzow	points
Light-middleweight	Greaves	Wright	points
Middleweight	van der Kolff	Crawford	points
Light heavyweight	van Vuuren	Madigan	points
Heavyweight	Harper	Buchanan	points
