= Boxing at the 1908 Summer Olympics – Featherweight =

Boxing competitions

Men's featherweight boxing at the Games of the IV Olympiad
- Date: October 27, 1908
- Competitors: 8 from 2 nations

Medalists
1st place, gold medalist(s)		Richard Gunn	Great Britain
2nd place, silver medalist(s)		Charles Morris	Great Britain
3rd place, bronze medalist(s)		Hugh Roddin	Great Britain

The featherweight was one of five boxing weight classes contested on the boxing at the 1908 Summer Olympics programme. Like all other boxing events, it was open only to men. The boxing competitions were held on October 27. The featherweight was the second-lightest class, allowing boxers of up to 126 pounds (57.2 kg). Eight boxers from two nations competed. Each NOC could enter up to 12 boxers. France entered 5 boxers, 3 of whom withdrew; Great Britain entered 8 boxers, 2 of whom withdrew.

== Competition format ==
There were three rounds in each bout, with the first two rounds being three minutes long and the last one going four minutes. Two judges scored the match, giving 5 points to the better boxer in each of the first two rounds and 7 to the better boxer in the third round. Marks were given to the other boxer in proportion to how well he did compared to the better. If the judges were not agreed on a winner at the end of the bout, the referee could either choose the winner or order a fourth round.

== Results ==
=== Bracket ===
Quarterfinals; October 27
Thomas Ringer (GBR)	2
Louis Constant (FRA)	0
Richard Gunn (GBR)	KO2
Étienne Poillot (FRA)	L
Hugh Roddin (GBR)	2
John Lloyd (GBR)	0
Charles Morris (GBR)	2
Edward Adams (GBR)	0

Semifinals; October 27
Thomas Ringer (GBR)	0
Richard Gunn (GBR)	2
Hugh Roddin (GBR)	0
Charles Morris (GBR)	2

Final; October 27
Richard Gunn (GBR)	2
Charles Morris (GBR)	0

Did not start: R. Boudin, C. Hamel, and L. Lacombe of France; P.A. Jones and W.F. Norton of Great Britain

=== Quarterfinals ===
Poillot gave Gunn strong competition in the first round, but Gunn knocked the Frenchman down shortly before the first bell. When Poillot went down again before the end of the second round, he did not get back up. Morris won relatively easily, hitting with both right and left. Constant, while never giving Ringer a serious chance of defeat, fought well throughout the bout. Roddin and Lloyd boxed a physical campaign, each taking a great deal of punishment before Roddin won by decision.

=== Semifinals ===
Gunn and Morris both won their bouts in the latter ends of the contests, with Roddin and Ringer giving stiff competition in the early rounds but not able to keep up with the winners the whole way through.

There was no bronze medal bout, the third place was attributed.

=== Final ===
Gunn fought Morris back and forth, with the 38-year-old veteran coming out on top following a strong final round.

== Standings ==
Rank	Boxer	Nation
1st place, gold medalist(s)	Richard Gunn	Great Britain
2nd place, silver medalist(s)	Charles Morris	Great Britain
3rd place, bronze medalist(s)	Hugh Roddin	Great Britain
4	Thomas Ringer	Great Britain
5	Edward Adams	Great Britain
5	Louis Constant	France
5	John Lloyd	Great Britain
5	Étienne Poillot	France

== Sources ==
- Official Report of the Games of the IV Olympiad (1908).
- De Wael, Herman. Herman's Full Olympians: "Boxing 1908". Accessed 8 April 2006. Available electronically at.
