= England Boxing National Amateur Championships Bantamweight Champions =

English Boxing competition

England Boxing National Amateur Championships Bantamweight Champions (U55kg)
- Status: active
- Genre: Boxing
- Inaugurated: 1884
- Organiser: England Boxing

The England Boxing National Amateur Championships Bantamweight Championship formerly known as the ABA Championships is the primary English amateur boxing championship. It had previously been contested by all the nations of the United Kingdom.

== History ==
The bantamweight division was inaugurated in 1884 and is currently the weight category of under 55 Kg. Following a re-organisation of weight categories in 2014, it was not held from 2014 until 2021. The championships are highly regarded in the boxing world and seen as the most prestigious national amateur championships.

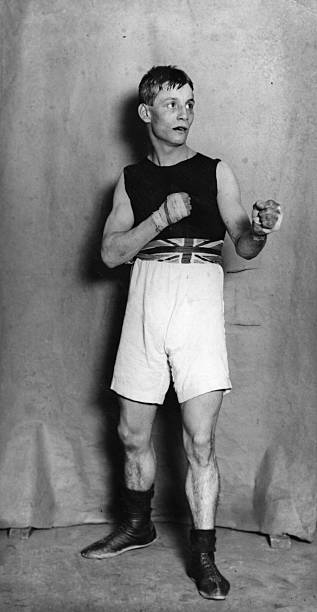
Harry Thomas was the 1908 champion

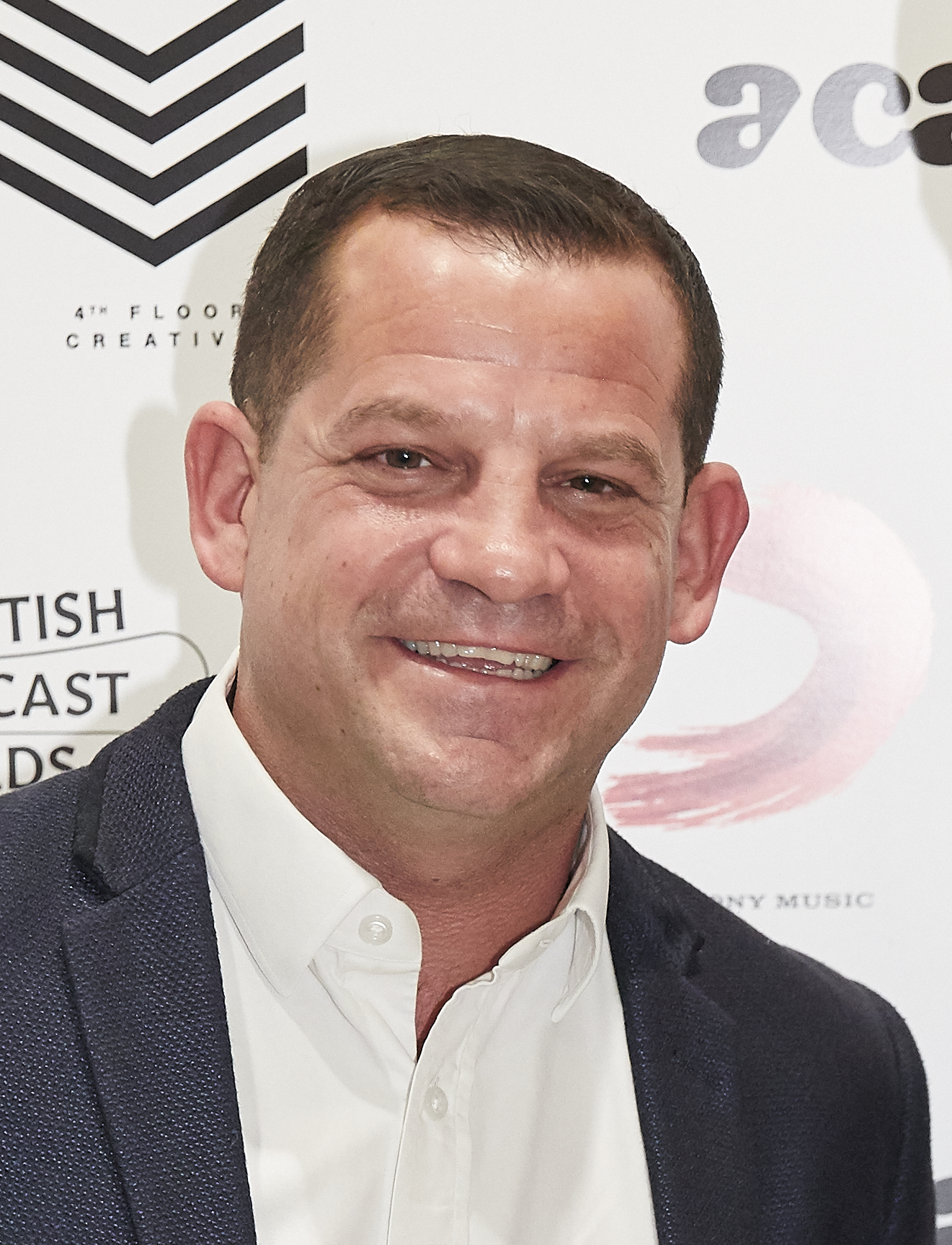
Spencer Oliver was the 1994 champion

== Past winners ==
Year	Winner	Club
1884	Alfred Woodward	(Birmingham ABC)
1885	Alfred Woodward	(Birmingham ABC)
1886	Tom Illsley	(Birmingham ABC)
1887	Tom Illsley	(Birmingham ABC)
1888	Harry Charles Montague Oakman	(Mid Surrey ABC)
1889	H. Brown	(Northampton ABC)
1890	J. J. Rowe	(Royal Victor ABC)
1891	E. Moore	(Birmingham ABC)
1892	Fred Godbold	(Royal Victor ABC)
1893	E. A. Watson	(Battersea/Sydney ABC)
1894	Percy A. Jones	(New Kent Road ABC)
1895	Percy A. Jones	(Cestus ABC)
1896	Percy A. Jones	(Lynn ABC)
1897	C. T. Lamb	(Gothic ABC)
1898	Fred Herring	(Columbia ABC)
1899	Alfred Avent	(Bristol ABC)
1900	James Freeman	(Lynn ABC)
1901	Wally F. Morgan	(Kensington ABC)
1902	Arthur J. Miner	(Lynn ABC)
1903	Harry Perry	(Columbia ABC)
1904	Harry Perry	(Columbia ABC)
1905	Wally Webb	(17th Middlesex Rifles)
1906	Tom Ringer	(Lynn ABC)
1907	Will E. Adams	(Columbia ABC)
1908	Harry Thomas	(Birmingham ABC)
1909	John Condon	(Lynn ABC)
1910	Wally Webb	(St. Pancras ABC)
1911	William W. Allen	(Polytechnic Boxing Club)
1912	William W. Allen	(Polytechnic Boxing Club)
1913	Alfred Wye	(Columbia ABC)
1914	William W. Allen	(Lynn ABC)
1915-18	Not held	
1919	William W. Allen	(Lynn ABC)
1920	George McKenzie	(United Scottish BC)
1921	Les Tarrant	(Armstrong-Siddeley ABC)
1922	W. Goulding	(St. Pancras ABC)
1923	A. W. Smith	(Limehouse ABC)
1924	Les Tarrant	(Armstrong-Siddeley ABC)
1925	Arthur George Edwin Goom	(Rugby ABC)
1926	Fred Webster	(St. Pancras ABC)
1927	Teddy Warwick	(Columbia ABC)
1928	Pte. Jack Garland	(Gordon Highlanders)
1929	L/Cpl. F. Bennett	(East Lancashire Regiment)
1930	Harry Mizler	(Oxford & St. Georges ABC)
1931	Cpl. F. Bennett	(East Lancashire Regiment)
1932	Jack Treadaway	(Watneys ABC)
1933	Gilbert Johnstone	(Dundee Rosebank ABC)
1934	Albert Barnes	(Cardiff City ABC)
1935	Laurie Case	(Darlington Railway Employees ABC)
1936	Albert Barnes	(Cardiff City ABC)
1937	Albert Barnes	(Cardiff City ABC)
1938	Jackie Pottinger	(Cardiff Gas BC)
1939	Robert Watson	(Leith Victoria BC)
1940-42	Not held	
1943	Tim Mahoney	(Downham Community ABC)
1944	Ronnie Bissell	(Hillsborough ABC)
1945	Peter Brander	(Slough Centre ABC)
1946	LAC Charlie Squires	(Royal Air Force)
1947	Danny O'Sullivan	(Robert Browning ABC)
1948	Tommy Proffitt	(LNER ABC)
1949	Tommy Miller	(Glasgow Transport BC)
1950	Ken Lawrence	(Southampton ABC)
1951	LAC Tommy Nicholls	(Royal Air Force)
1952	Tommy Nicholls	(Sankeys ABC)
1953	John Smillie	(Fauldhouse Miners ABC)
1954	John Smillie	(Fauldhouse Miners ABC)
1955	Pte. George Dormer	(Army & West Ham ABC)
1956	AC Owen Reilly	(Royal Air Force)
1957	Johnny Morrissey	(Lanark Welfare BC)
1958	Howard Winstone	(Dowlais BC)
1959	Dvr. Don Weller	(Army)
1960	Frankie Taylor	(Lancaster Lads ABC)
1961	LAC Peter Benneyworth	(Royal Air Force)
1962	Peter Benneyworth	(Caius ABC)
1963	Brian Packer	(Dartford ABC)
1964	Brian Packer	(Dartford ABC)
1965	Bobby Mallon	(Rolls Royce ABC)
1966	Johnny Clark	(Robert Browning ABC)
1967	Mickey Carter	(Repton ABC)
1968	Mickey Carter	(Repton ABC)
1969	Mickey Piner	(Hayes ABC)
1970	Tony Oxley	(Royal Navy)
1971	George Turpin	(Golden Gloves ABC)
1972	George Turpin	(Golden Gloves ABC)
1973	Pat Cowdell	(Warley ABC)
1974	Stewart Ogilvie	(Camperdown ABC)
1975	Stewart Ogilvie	(Camperdown ABC)
1976	John Bambrick	(Edinburgh Transport BC)
1977	Jackie Turner	(Hull Fish Trades ABC)
1978	Jackie Turner	(Hull Fish Trades ABC)
1979	Renard Ashton	(Vauxhall Motors ABC)
1980	Ray Gilbody	(St. Helens Star ABC)
1981	Peter Jones	(Penyrheol BC)
1982	Ray Gilbody	(St. Helens Star ABC)
1983	John Hyland	(St. Ambrose ABC)
1984	John Hyland	(St. Ambrose ABC)
1985	Sean Murphy	(St. Albans ABC)
1986	Sean Murphy	(St. Albans ABC)
1987	John Sillitoe	(Pisces ABC)
1988	Keith Howlett	(Army)
1989	Keith Howlett	(Army)
1990	Paul Lloyd	(Vauxhall Motors ABC)
1991	Dave Hardie	(Gallowgate ABC)
1992	Patrick Mullings	(St. Patrick's ABC)
1993	Richard Evatt	(Triumph ABC)
1994	Spencer Oliver	(Finchley ABC)
1995	Noel Wilders	(Five Towns ABC)
1996	Lee Eadie	(Gemini ABC)
1997	Stephen Oates	(Repton ABC)
1998	Levi Pattison	(Hunslett ABC)
1999	Michael Hunter	(Hartlepool Boys ABC)
2000	Stephen Foster	(Shannon's ABC)
2001	Stephen Foster	(Shannon's ABC)
2002	Derry Mathews	(Salisbury ABC)
2003	Nick McDonald	(Vauxhall Motors ABC)
2004	Matthew Marsh	(West Ham ABC)
2005	Stuart Langley	(Hollington ABC)
2006	Nick McDonald	(Vauxhall Motors ABC)
2007	Luke Campbell	(St. Paul's ABC)
2008	Luke Campbell	(St. Paul's ABC)
2009	James Allen	(Army)
2010	Jazza Dickens	(Salisbury ABC)
2011	Alimaan Hussain	(Aston ABC)
2012	Reece Bellotti	(South Oxhey ABC)
2013	Lucien Reid	(West Ham ABC)
not held from 2014-2021
2022	Shaun Huddart	(Birtley ABC)
2023	Kurt Wiggins	(Salisbury)
2024	Kai Birch	(JCs)
2025	Abdulrahman Burton	(Longsight)
2026	Owen Campbell	(No Limits)
