= Frank McQuillan =

Scottish boxer

Personal information
- Nationality: British (Scottish)
- Born: c. 1934 Dundee, Scotland

Sport
- Sport: Boxing
- Event: Lightweight
- Club: Dundee ABC
Medal record
Men's Boxing
Representing Scotland
British Empire and Commonwealth Games
Silver medal – second place	1954 Vancouver	Lightweight

Frank McQuillan (born c. 1934 – date of death unknown) was a boxer from Scotland who won a silver medal at the 1954 British Empire and Commonwealth Games (now Commonwealth Games).

== Biography ==
McQuillan was educated at St Joseph’s Boys Primary School and St John's Secondary School at Park Place. He trained at Dudhope Castle and was the 1953 Scottish ABA lightweight champion.

McQuillan, a plumber by trade, reached the ABA lightweight title final in 1954, losing out to George Whelan

Boxing out of Dundee Amateur Boxing Club, he represented the Scottish team at the 1954 British Empire and Commonwealth Games in Vancouver, Canada, where he won the silver medal behind Piet van Staden in the lightweight division.

In 1955, he was the Scottish champion again.
