= Richard Gunn =

Richard Gunn may refer to:

- Richard Gunn (actor), American actor
- Richard Gunn (boxer) (1871–1961), British Olympic boxer

== See also ==
- Rick Gunn, member of the North Carolina Senate
