= Poillot =

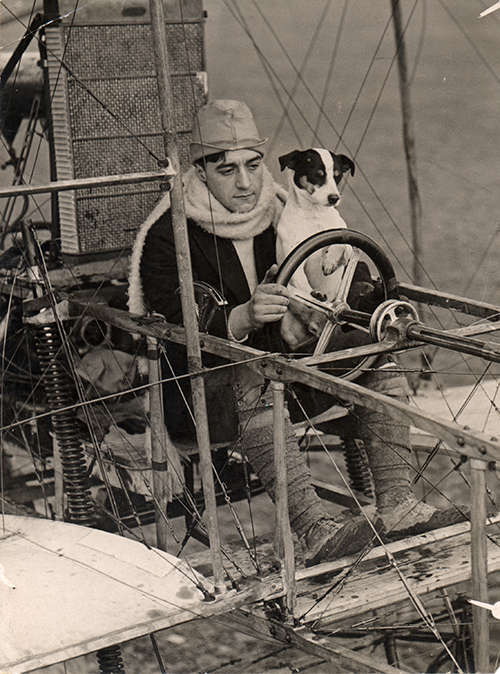
Edmond Poillot flying a Voisin biplane with a dog, Smithsonian National Air and Space Museum

Poillot is a French surname and may refer to:

- Denis Poillot (died 1534), French knight and diplomat
- Edmond Poillot (1888–1910), French journalist, aviator and boxer
- Émile Poillot (1886–1948), French organist and pianist
- Jules Poillot (1864–1942), French physician and politician
