= Josser =

Josser may refer to:

- Josser Watling (1925–2023), English footballer
- Jimmy Josser, a character played by Ernie Lotinga in a series of British comedy films and shorts (1928–1934?) and on the stage
- British slang for a cretin or simpleton
