= Harry Johnson (boxer) =

British boxer

Olympic medal record

Men's boxing
| Bronze medal – third place | 1908 London | Lightweight |

Herbert Henry Johnson (10 August 1887 – 16 December 1947) was a British lightweight professional boxer who competed in the early twentieth century. He won a bronze medal in Boxing at the 1908 Summer Olympics losing against Frederick Spiller in the semi-finals.
