= Jimmy McIvor =

New Zealand boxer (1930–2008)

Personal information
- Born: James McIvor; 27 October 1930
- Died: 2 November 2008 (aged 78)
- Height: 1.71 m (5 ft 7 1/2 in)
- Weight: 68 kg (149 lb)

Boxing career
- Country: New Zealand
- Sport: Boxing
- Weight class: Welterweight

Achievements and titles
- National finals: Amateur welterweight champion (1948, 1949)

James McIvor (27 October 1930 – 2 November 2008) was a New Zealand boxer.

Born on 27 October 1930, McIvor was the son of Elizabeth and John McIvor. From Hastings, he won the national amateur welterweight title in 1948 and 1949.

McIvor was selected in the New Zealand team to compete at the 1950 Empire Games in Auckland in the welterweight (64–69 kg) division. In his first-round bout, he defeated Johannes Small of Rhodesia on points, before being defeated by Terry Ratcliffe—the eventual gold medallist—of England, also on points, in the semifinals. McIvor withdrew unfit from the fight against Alex Obeysekere of Ceylon to decide the bronze medal, and so finished fourth in the competition.

Not long after the Empire Games, McIvor turned professional, and compiled a professional career record of 9 wins (5 by knockout) and 4 losses, before retiring in 1952, aged 21.

McIvor later worked as an auctioneer. He died on 2 November 2008, at the age of 78, and was buried at Havelock North Cemetery.
