= William Webb (boxer) =

British boxer

Olympic medal record

Men's Boxing
Bronze medal – third place	1908 London	Bantamweight

William "Wally" Webb (4 July 1882 – 1949) was a British bantamweight boxer who competed in the early twentieth century. He won a bronze medal in boxing at the 1908 Summer Olympics losing against John Condon in the semi-finals.
