= Boxing at the 1908 Summer Olympics – Lightweight =

Boxing competitions

Men's lightweight boxing at the Games of the IV Olympiad
- Date: October 27, 1908
- Competitors: 12 from 3 nations

Medalists
| 1st place, gold medalist(s) | | Frederick Grace | Great Britain |
| 2nd place, silver medalist(s) | | Frederick Spiller | Great Britain |
| 3rd place, bronze medalist(s) | | Harry Johnson | Great Britain |

The lightweight was one of five boxing weight classes contested on the 1908 Summer Olympics programme. Like all other boxing events, it was open only to men. The boxing competitions were held on October 27. The lightweight was the middle class, allowing boxers of up to 140 pounds (63.5 kg). Twelve boxers from three nations competed. Each NOC could enter up to 12 boxers. Australasia entered 1 boxer, who withdrew; France entered 3 boxers, 2 of whom withdrew; Denmark entered 2 boxers; and Great Britain entered 9 boxers.

== Competition format ==
There were three rounds in each bout, with the first two rounds being three minutes long and the last one going four minutes. Two judges scored the match, giving 5 points to the better boxer in each of the first two rounds and 7 to the better boxer in the third round. Marks were given to the other boxer in proportion to how well he did compared to the better. If the judges were not agreed on a winner at the end of the bout, the referee could either choose the winner or order a fourth round.

== Results ==
=== Bracket ===
Round of 16; October 27
Harry Johnson (GBR) | 2
Hemming Hansen (DEN) | 0
Harry Holmes (GBR) | KO2
André Bouvier (FRA) | L
George Jessup (GBR) | KO1
Frederick Osborne (GBR) | L
Patrick Fee (GBR) | 0
Frederick Spiller (GBR) | 2
Matt Wells (GBR) | 2 (4th)
Waldemar Holberg (DEN) | 1
Frederick Grace (GBR) | 2
Ernie Fearman (GBR) | 0

Quarterfinals; October 27
Johnson (GBR) | 2
Holmes (GBR) | 1
Jessup (GBR) | L
Spiller (GBR) | KO2
Wells (GBR) | 0
Grace (GBR) | 2

Semifinals; October 27
Johnson (GBR) | 0
Spiller (GBR) | 2
Grace (GBR) | -
Bye | -

Final; October 27
Spiller (GBR) | 0
Grace (GBR) | 2

Did not start: G. Blake of Australasia; R. Eustache and E. Manzone of France

=== Round of 16 ===
Wells and Holberg split the judges over the course of the first three rounds. The referee declared a fourth round, which Wells won in a contest which involved more grappling than punching. Bouvier was knocked down several times by Holmes before the referee stopped the contest. Jessup dominated his match, with Osborne not lasting past the first round. Grace, Spiller, and Johnson each won by decisions varying in closeness.

=== Quarterfinals ===
Spiller had the easiest time of it in the round, nearly eliminating Jessup in the first. The second round saw Jessup counted out. Grace and Wells fought a defensive bout, without either receiving much punishment. Johnson won a tight bout with Holmes by referee's decision.

=== Semifinals ===
Grace took a bye in the semifinals and Spiller's easy win made the round an uneventful one.

=== Final ===
Each boxer went to the mat in the second, but Grace piled on more hits than did Spiller to win the bout.

== Standings ==
| Rank | Boxer | Nation |
|---|---|---|
| 1st place, gold medalist(s) | Frederick Grace | Great Britain |
| 2nd place, silver medalist(s) | Frederick Spiller | Great Britain |
| 3rd place, bronze medalist(s) | Harry Johnson | Great Britain |
| 4 | Harry Holmes | Great Britain |
| 4 | George Jessup | Great Britain |
| 4 | Matt Wells | Great Britain |
| 7 | André Bouvier | France |
| 7 | Edward Fearman | Great Britain |
| 7 | Patrick Fee | Great Britain |
| 7 | Hemming Hansen | Denmark |
| 7 | Waldemar Holberg | Denmark |
| 7 | Frederick Osborne | Great Britain |

== Sources ==
- Official Report of the Games of the IV Olympiad (1908).
- De Wael, Herman. Herman's Full Olympians: "Boxing 1908". Accessed 8 April 2006. Available electronically at.
