= Ronnie Latham =

Boxer who competed for England

Personal information
- Nationality: British (English)
- Born: 4 June 1929
- Died: 4th quarter 1973 (aged 44) Thurnscoe, West Riding of Yorkshire
Medal record
Boxing
Representing England
British Empire Games
Gold medal – first place	1950 Auckland	60kg

Ronald Latham (1929-1973) was a male boxer who competed for England.

== Boxing career ==
He represented England and won a gold medal in the 60 kg division at the 1950 British Empire Games in Auckland, New Zealand.

He was part of Hickleton Main Boxing Club and won the 63rd ABA National Championship lightweight title.

== Personal life ==
He was a blacksmith by trade at the Hickleton Main Colliery.
