= Michael Carter (boxer) =

British boxer

Personal information
- Nationality: British
- Born: 17 June 1949 (age 75); London, England

Sport
- Sport: Boxing

Michael Carter (born 17 June 1949) is a British boxer. He competed in the men's bantamweight event at the 1968 Summer Olympics. He fought as Mickey Carter.

He won the 1967 and 1968 Amateur Boxing Association British bantamweight title, when boxing out of the Repton ABC.
