= Charles Morris (boxer) =

British boxer

Olympic medal record

Men's Boxing
| Silver medal – second place | 1908 London | Featherweight |

Charles William Morris (23 August 1879 – 9 April 1959) was a British featherweight boxer who competed in the early twentieth century. He won a silver medal in Boxing at the 1908 Summer Olympics.

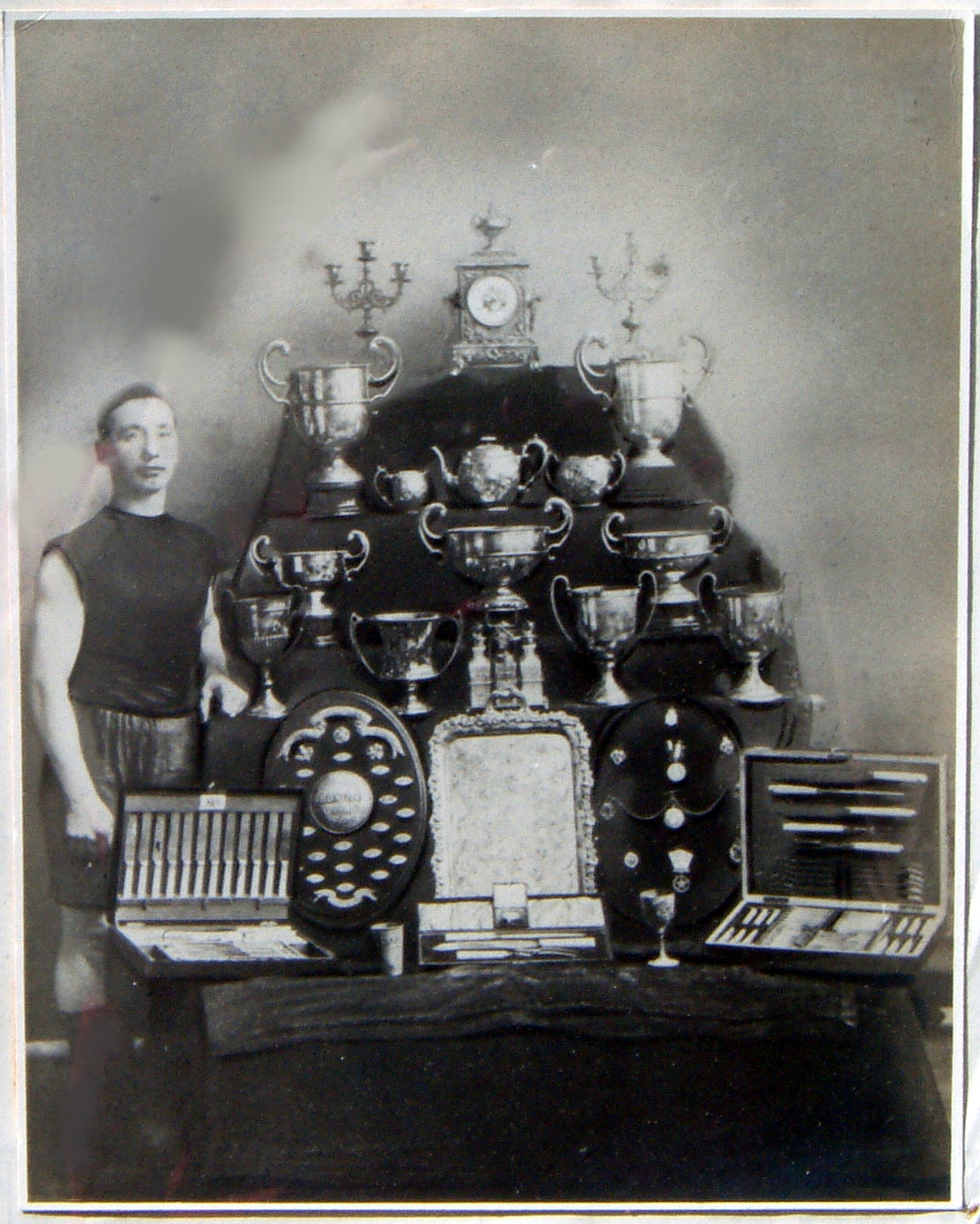
Charles Morris with trophies

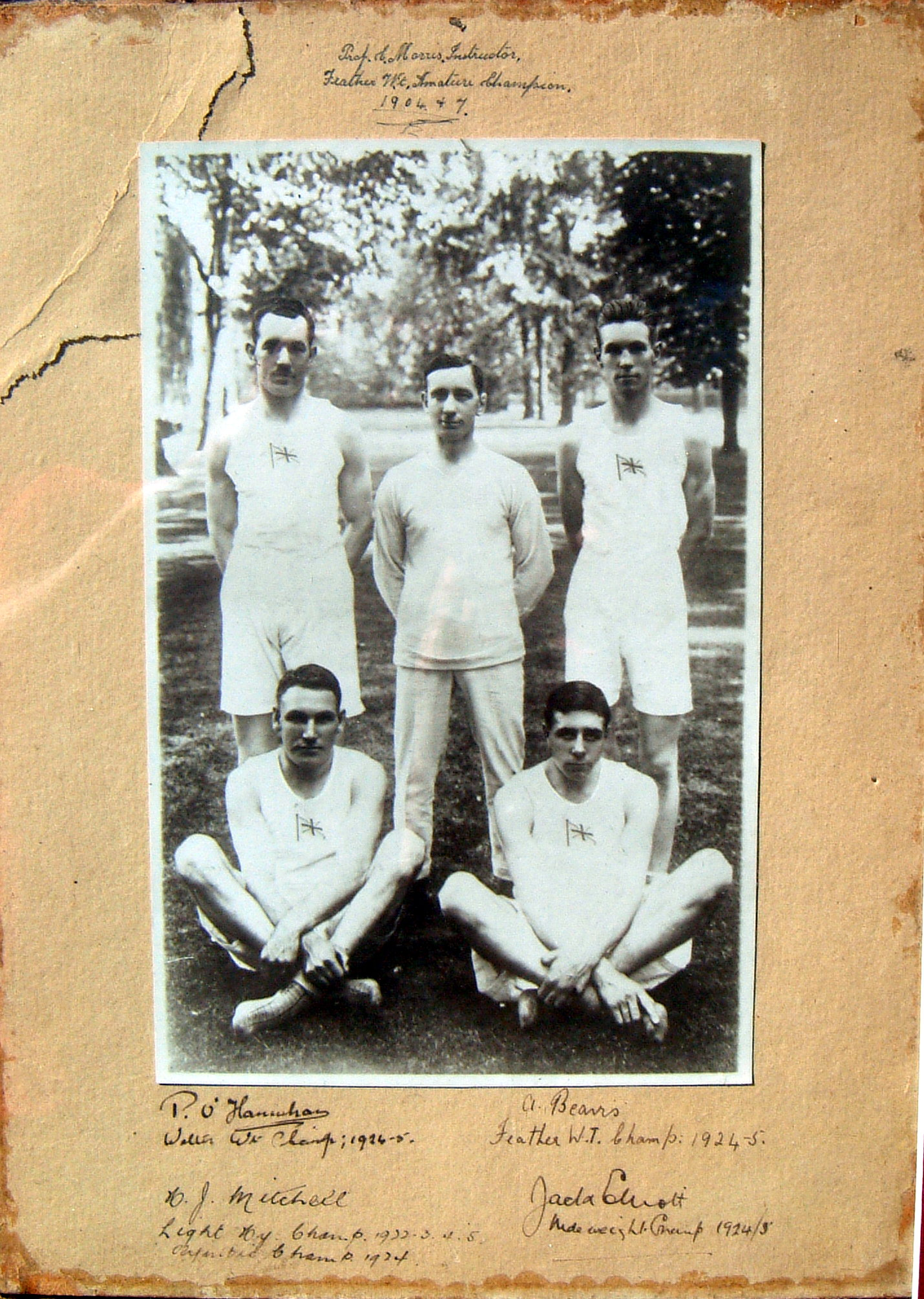
Morris with pupils

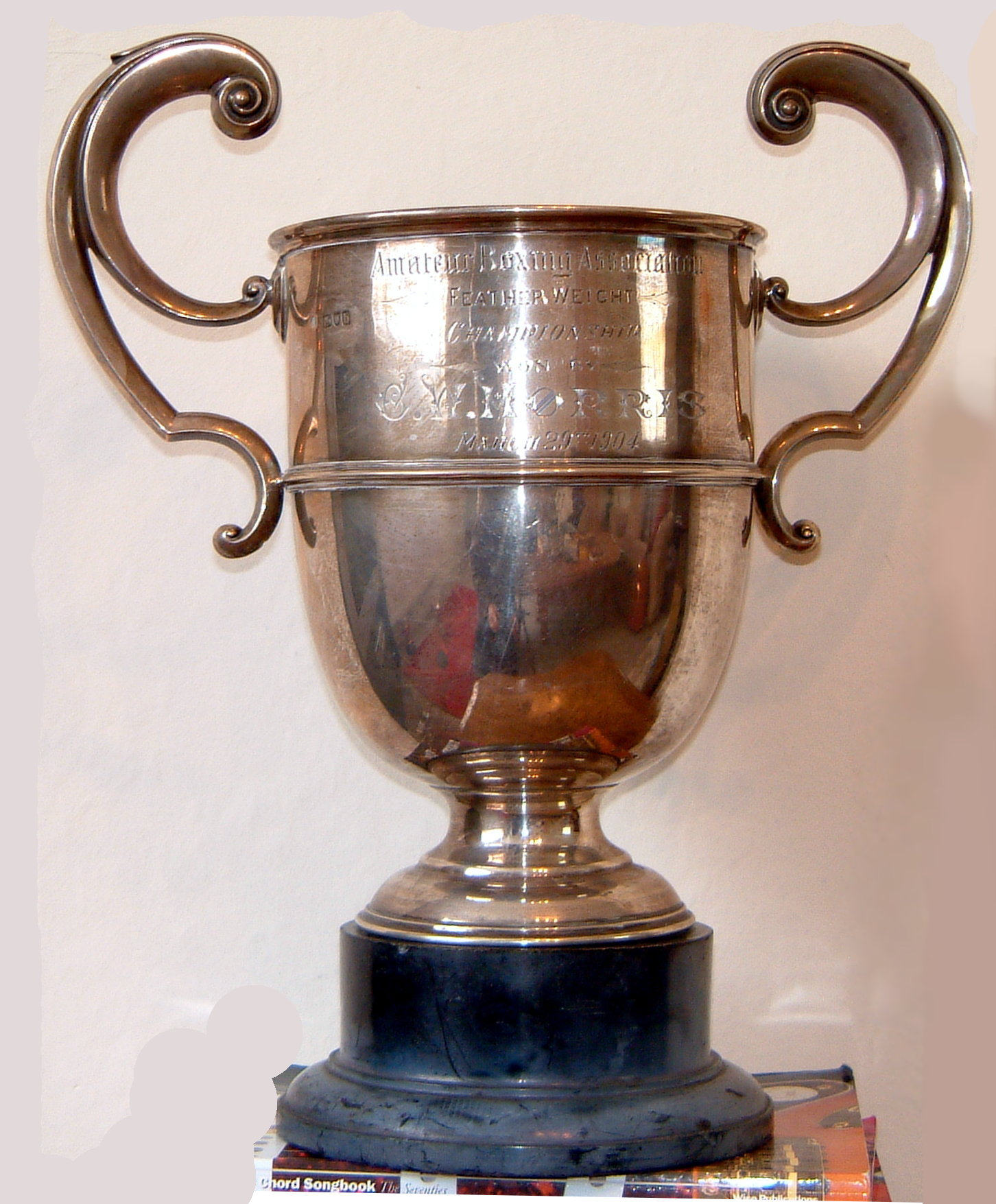
ABA Cup presented to Morris in 1904
