= Henry Perry (British boxer) =

British boxer

Henry Perry (9 August 1878 – 24 April 1969) was a British bantamweight amateur boxer who competed in the early twentieth century. He lost in the quarterfinals in Boxing at the 1908 Summer Olympics – Bantamweight. He fought as Harry Perry.

Perry won the 1903 and 1904 Amateur Boxing Association British bantamweight title, when boxing out of the Columbia ABC. Perry was just four feet nine inches in height but was described as a hustling, bustling terrifying fighter.
