= Malcolm Collins (boxer) =

Welsh boxer

Personal information
- Nationality: British (Welsh)
- Born: c. 1935 Cardiff, Wales
- Died: 4 February 2021 (aged 85)

Sport
- Sport: Boxing
- Event: Featherweight
- Club: Cardiff Gas BC; Melingriffith ABC
Medal record
Men's boxing
Representing Wales
British Empire and Commonwealth Games
Silver medal – second place	1954 Vancouver	Featherweight
Silver medal – second place	1958 Cardiff	Featherweight

Malcolm Collins (c. 1935 – 4 February 2021) was a boxer from Wales who won consecutive silver medals at the British Empire and Commonwealth Games (now Commonwealth Games).

== Biography ==
Colllins won the five Welsh ABA championships and fought 270 bouts, appearing in the 1954 Guinness Book of World Records for 31 first round knock-outs.

He represented the Welsh team at the 1954 British Empire and Commonwealth Games in Vancouver, Canada, where he won the silver medal in the 57kg featherweight division.

Four years later he repeated his silver medal feat at the 1958 British Empire and Commonwealth Games by reaching the final of the featherweight category again, only to lose out to Wally Taylor of Australia.

Boxing out of Melingriffith ABC, he twice won the prestigious ABA featherweight championship.

Later in life he worked as a boxing writer for the South Wales Echo.
