= Athletics at the 1950 British Empire Games – Men's marathon =

Men's marathon at the Commonwealth Games

The men's marathon event at the 1950 British Empire Games was held on 11 February in Auckland, New Zealand, with start and finish at the Eden Park.

== Results ==
Rank	Name	Nationality	Time	Notes
1st place, gold medalist(s)	Jack Holden	England	2:32:57	GR
2nd place, silver medalist(s)	Syd Luyt	South Africa	2:37:03	
3rd place, bronze medalist(s)	Jack Clarke	New Zealand	2:39:27	
4	Gordon Stanley	Australia	2:40:49	
5	Tom Richards	Wales	2:42:11	
6	Paul Collins	Canada	2:45:01	
7	Bill Bromily	New Zealand	2:46:51	
8	George Norman	Canada	2:47:50	
9	Robert Prentice	Australia	2:48:54	
10	Walter Fedorick	Canada	2:51:29	
11	Gérard Côté	Canada	2:51:59	
12	Arthur Lydiard	New Zealand	2:54:52	
13	Lionel Fox	New Zealand	2:57:47	
14	Jack Paterson	Scotland	3:00:59	
	William Emmerton	Australia	DNF	
	John Pottage	Australia	DNF	
	John Davey	Australia	DNS	
