= Dazzo Williams =

English boxer

Personal information
- Nationality: British
- Born: Darren Williams; 19 March 1974 (age 52) Lambeth, London, England
- Height: 5 ft 8 in (173 cm)
- Weight: Featherweight

Boxing career

Boxing record
- Total fights: 15
- Wins: 12
- Win by KO: 3
- Losses: 3

Darren "Dazzo" Williams (born 19 March 1974) is a British former professional boxer who competed from 2001 to 2005. He held the British featherweight title from 2003 to 2005 and challenged once for the Commonwealth and EBU European featherweight titles in 2005.

== Career ==
=== Amateur career ===
Born and raised in Lambeth, London, and based in Hereford during his boxing career, Williams, a former soldier, trained at Gelligaer ABC. He won the 1998 Amateur Boxing Association British featherweight title, when boxing out of the Army ABC.

=== Professional career ===
He made his professional debut in February 2001, beating Mickey Coveney via a second-round knockout.

After winning eight from his first ten fights, culminating in a narrow title eliminator win against Steve Chinnock, he challenged for Roy Rutherford's British featherweight title in November 2003 at the Kings Hall, Belfast, taking another narrow points decision. He made three successful title defences in 2004, beating Jamie McKeever, Rutherford, and John Simpson (a controversial victory by only one point) to win the Lonsdale Belt outright.

In June 2005 he faced Nicky Cook, with Cook's Commonwealth and European titles at stake in addition to Williams' British title. Cook knocked Williams out in the second round.

Williams retired from boxing after the Cook fight, initially opening the Wye Amateur Boxing Club with Allan Ford, later also going into promotion.

In 2008 he staged a 100-round 'spar-a-thon' at Wye ABC to raise money for the club. In 2010 the club won the Queen's Award for Voluntary Service.
