= Les Tarrant =

British boxer (1903–1979)

Personal information
- Nationality: British
- Born: 26 May 1903; Coventry, England
- Died: January 1979 (aged 75); Coventry, England

Sport
- Sport: Boxing

Lester Mark Tarrant (26 May 1903 – 1979) also recorded as Leicester Mark Tarrant was a British boxer. He competed in the men's bantamweight event at the 1924 Summer Olympics and fought as Les Tarrant.

Tarrant won the 1921 and 1924 Amateur Boxing Association British bantamweight titles and the 1922 flyweight title, when boxing out of the Armstrong- Siddeley ABC.
