= Charlie Usher =

Scotland rugby union player and fencer

Personal information
- Nationality: British (Scottish)
- Born: 26 September 1891
- Died: 21 January 1981 (aged 89) Haddington, Scotland

Sport
- Sport: Rugby union / Fencing
- Event: middle/long-distance
- Club: Scottish Fencing Union; Edinburgh University

Charles Milne Usher (26 September 1891 – 21 January 1981) was a rugby union player and fencer from Scotland.

== Biography ==
Usher was born on 26 September 1891, the son of a brewing business owner. He was educated at Merchiston College and then Sandhurst before joining the Gordon Highlanders in 1911.

During World War I he was a prisoner of war for over four years.

Usher played at number eight, and also captained Scotland. He was capped sixteen times between 1912 and 1922 (partly due to the hiatus caused by World War I). Because of this, he has one of the longest international careers on record. In 1939, he commanded the 1st Battalion of the Gordons.

At the 1950 British Empire Games in Auckland, New Zealand, he was given the honour of being the Scottish team manager and represented the Scottish team in the épée tournament.

== See also ==
- Jock Wemyss, who also played on both sides of the war.
