= Harry Holmes (boxer) =

British boxer

Personal information
- Nationality: British
- Born: 12 November 1878; Hampstead, London, England
- Died: 8 February 1951 (aged 72); Hampstead, London, England

Sport
- Sport: Boxing

Henry Charles Berkeley Holmes (1878–1951) was a British boxer. He competed in the men's lightweight event at the 1908 Summer Olympics.

At the start of his boxing career, he won the 1905 Amateur Boxing Association British featherweight title, when boxing out of the 17th Middlesex Rifles BC. In 1908, he left the Columbia BC, joined the Polytechnic Boxing Club, won a second A.B.A title (this time at the lightweight class), and went on to compete in the 1908 Summer Olympics in that year.
