= Christopher Rollinson =

New Zealand boxer (1928–1988)

Personal information
- Full name: Christopher Marcus Rollinson
- Born: 25 May 1928
- Died: 7 April 1988 (aged 59)

Sport
- Sport: Boxing
- Weight class: Light heavyweight
Medal record
Representing New Zealand
Men's Boxing
British Empire Games
Silver medal – second place	1950 Auckland	Light heavyweight

Christopher Marcus Rollinson (25 May 1928 – 7 April 1988) was a New Zealand boxer.

Rollinson represented his country at the 1950 British Empire Games in Auckland. He reached the final of the light heavyweight division, where he won the silver medal. The referee stopped the contest after Rollinson was knocked down three times in the first round by his opponent, Don Scott, of England.

Rollinson died on 7 April 1988.
