= Jamie McKeever =

British former professional boxer (born 1979)

Personal information
- Nickname: Relentless
- Nationality: British
- Born: 7 July 1979 (age 47) Birkenhead, Merseyside, England
- Height: 5 ft 6 1/2 in (169 cm)
- Weight: Featherweight; Super featherweight

Boxing career
- Stance: Orthodox

Boxing record
- Total fights: 29
- Wins: 18
- Win by KO: 6
- Losses: 10
- Draws: 1

Jamie McKeever (born 7 July 1979) is a British former professional boxer who competed from 1998 to 2010. He held the British featherweight title in 2003 and challenged once for the Commonwealth featherweight title in 2006.

== Career ==
Born in Birkenhead, McKeever made his professional debut in March 1998 with a points win over Dave Hinds. After winning 13 of his first 17 fights he beat Tony Mulholland in September 2002 to take the vacant BBBofC Central Area and World Boxing Foundation Intercontinental featherweight titles.

McKeever and Mulholland met again in February 2003 for the vacant British featherweight title; McKeever stopped Mulholland in the sixth round to become British champion. In May he defended the title against Roy Rutherford, losing on points. He didn't fight again until he challenged for the title again in February 2004, this time against Dazzo Williams in Bridgend. The fight again went the distance, with Williams retaining the title.

After 18 months out of the ring, McKeever returned in September 2005, winning his next three fights before challenging Jackson Asiku for the Commonwealth featherweight title in June 2006, Asiku stopping him in the first round.

In February 2007 he lost on points to Ryan Barrett for the British Master featherweight title, and the following month was stopped by Stevie Bell for the vacant BBBofC Central Area super featherweight title. In October he announced his retirement from boxing, but he returned in June 2008, Ryan Brawley stopping him in the seventh round.

In May 2010 he returned for the final time, losing on points to Dougie Curran.
