= Frederick Spiller =

British boxer

Olympic medal record

Men's Boxing
Silver medal – second place	1908 London	Lightweight

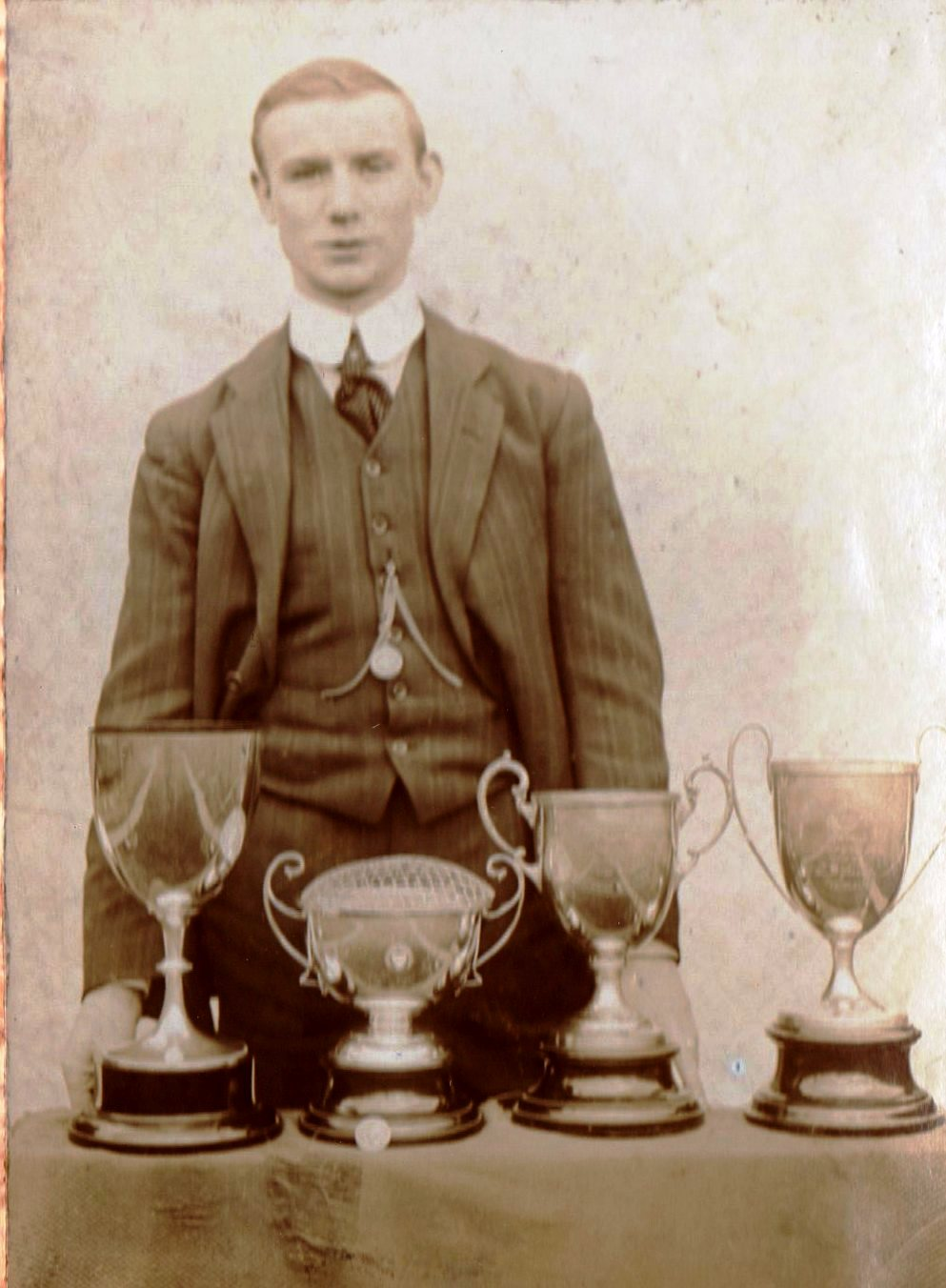
Frederick Spiller

M. Frederick "Fred" Spiller (22 November 1884 – 14 September 1953) was a British lightweight boxer who competed in the early 20th century.

He won a silver medal in boxing at the 1908 Summer Olympics after losing the final of the lightweight competition against Frederick Grace. He continued boxing until his death on 14 September 1953.
