= Jack Paterson (marathon runner) =

Scottish athlete

Personal information
- Nationality: British (Scottish)
- Born: c.1913

Sport
- Sport: Athletics
- Event(s): Long-distance, marathon
- Club: Polytechnic Harriers

John Paterson (c.1913 – date of death unknown) was a track and field athlete from Scotland who competed at the 1950 British Empire Games (now Commonwealth Games).

== Biography ==
Paterson was a member of the Polytechnic Harriers and was the 1949 Scottish marathon champion.

He represented the Scottish Empire Games team at the 1950 British Empire Games in Auckland, New Zealand, participating in one event, the marathon.

Paterson who lived in Tooting, South London, regained the Scottish marathon title in 1951.
