= Henry Thomas (boxer) =

British boxer

Harry Thomas
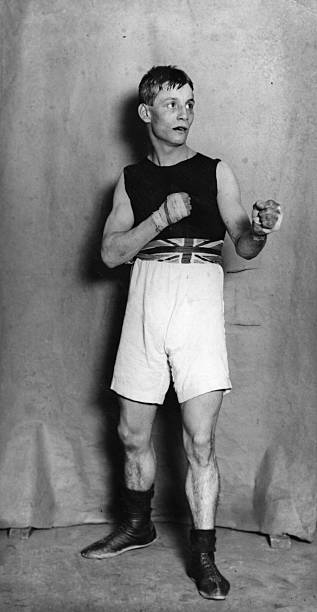
- Harry Thomas in 1908.

Personal information
- Nickname: Harry Thomas
- National team: Great Britain
- Born: Albert Henry Thomas; 1 July 1888 Kings Norton, Birmingham, England
- Died: 13 January 1963 (aged 74) New York City, USA

Sport
- Sport: Boxing
Medal record
Representing Great Britain
Men's Boxing
Gold medal – first place	1908 London	Bantamweight

Albert Henry Thomas (1 July 1888 – 13 January 1963) was a British bantamweight professional boxer who won a gold medal in Boxing at the 1908 Summer Olympics. He fought as Harry Thomas.

== Boxing career ==
Thomas won the 1908 Amateur Boxing Association British bantamweight title, when boxing out of the Birmingham ABC. He then competed for Great Britain at the 1908 Olympic Games in the boxing bantamweight division, where he won the gold medal with a decision over John Condon in the final.

In 1909, he went to the United States, where he remained except for a trip to Australia in 1913 and multiple visits to his home country, England, every so often, the last visit being in the late 1950s. He served in the United States Navy in World War I and became an American citizen. He was born in Birmingham, England and died in New York City, United States.

=== 1908 Olympic boxing record ===
Thomas competed as a bantamweight boxer for Great Britain at the 1908 London Olympics. The bantamweight division featured six boxers. Five were British; one was French. Here are Thomas' results from that boxing tournament:

- Quarterfinal: defeated Frank McGurk (Great Britain) by decision
- Semifinal: bye
- Final: defeated John Condon (Great Britain) by decision (won gold medal)
