= Henry Gilliland =

Scottish boxer (1928–2000)

Harry Gilliland
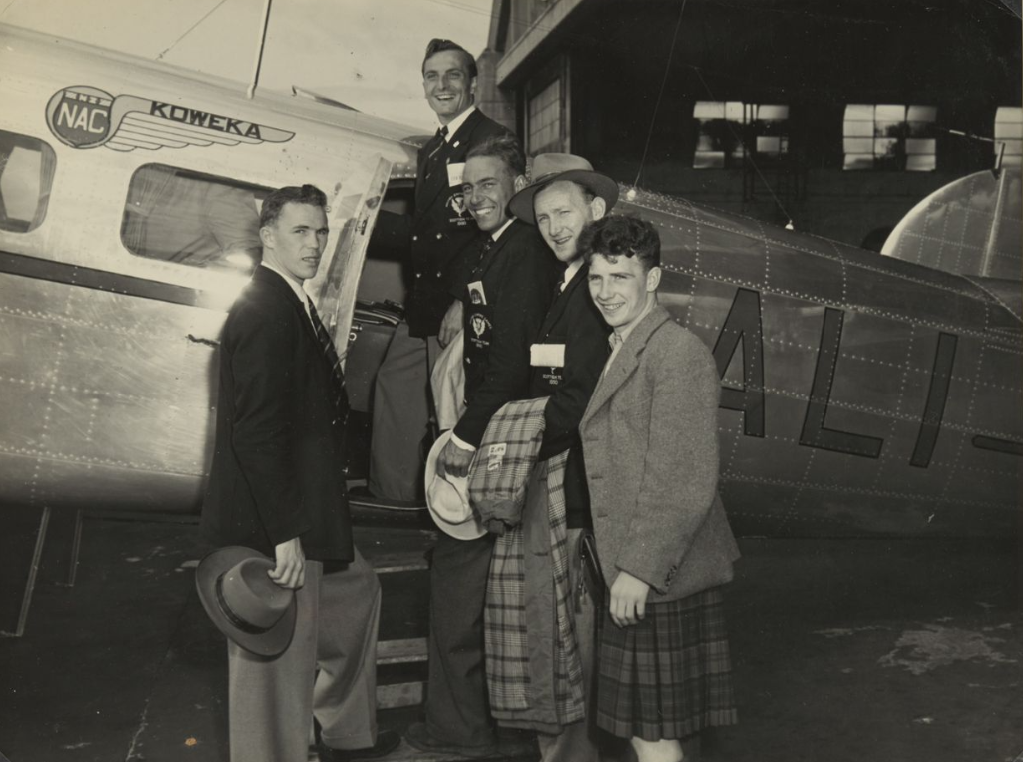
- The Scottish team depart Auckland, Harry Gilliland (far left); Auckland Libraries Heritage Collections

Personal information
- Nationality: British (Scottish)
- Born: 1928 Dreghorn, North Ayrshire, Scotland
- Died: 2000 (aged 71) Saltcoats, North Ayrshire, Scotland

Sport
- Sport: Boxing
- Event: Featherweight
- Club: Kilmarnock ABC
Medal record
Men's Boxing
Representing Scotland
British Empire Games
Gold medal – first place	1950 Auckland	Featherweight

Henry Gilliland (1928–2000) was a Scottish boxer who won a gold medal at the 1950 British Empire Games (now Commonwealth Games).

== Biography ==
Gilliland, also known as Harry Gilliland, was born in Dreghorn, North Ayrshire, Scotland in 1928. He won the 1949 ABA featherweight championship. Gilliland earned his place at the ABA finals by winning his quarter-final bout at Liverpool Stadium.

A baker by trade, living at Corsehill Terrace, Springside, he represented the Scottish team at the 1950 British Empire Games in Auckland, New Zealand, where he won the gold medal in the 57kg Featherweight division.

He turned professional in 1951 but only fought two bouts.

Gilliland died in Saltcoats, North Ayrshire in 2000, aged 71.
