= Hugh Riley =

Scottish boxer

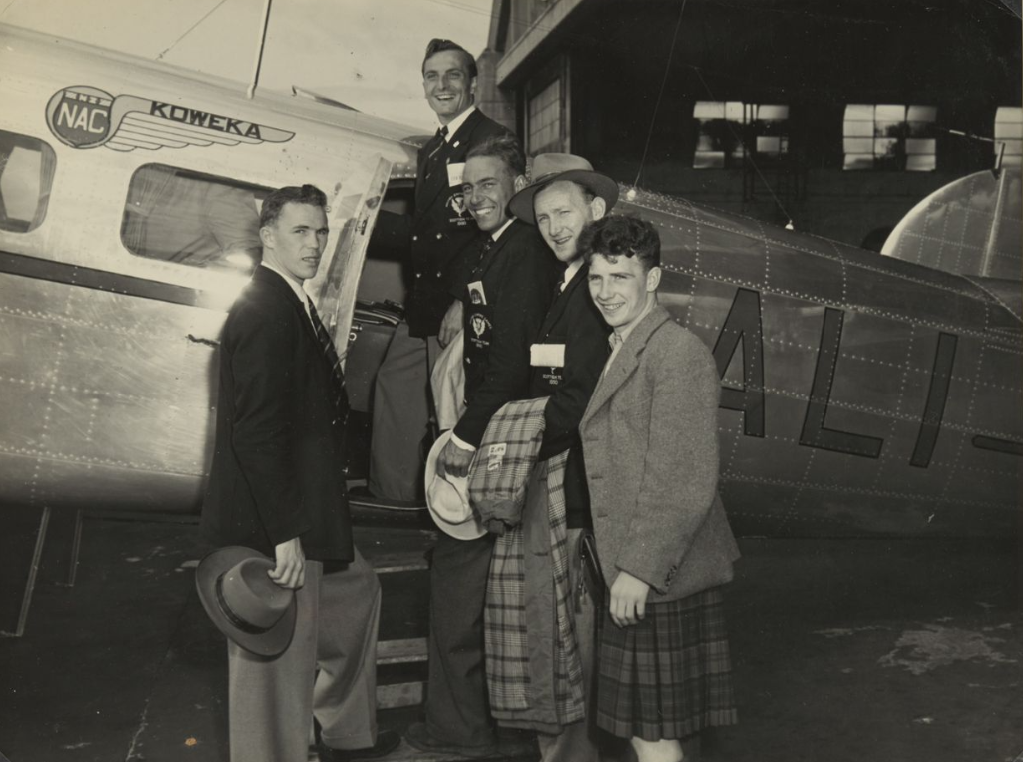
- The Scottish team depart Auckland, Hugh Riley (far right); Auckland Libraries Heritage Collections

Personal information
- Nationality: British (Scottish)
- Born: 8 November 1929 Edinburgh, Scotland
- Died: 23 November 2004 (aged 75) Edinburgh, Scotland

Sport
- Sport: Boxing
- Event: Flyweight
- Club: Gilmerton ABC
Medal record
Men's Boxing
Representing Scotland
British Empire Games
Gold medal – first place	1950 Auckland	Flyweight

Hugh Riley (8 November 1929 – 23 November 2004) was a boxer from Scotland who won a gold medal at the 1950 British Empire Games (now Commonwealth Games).

== Biography ==
Riley was born in the south of Edinburgh and introduced to boxing by his father Johnny Riley.

A plumber by trade, living at Parkside Street, he won the 1949 ABA flyweight championship.

He represented the Scottish team at the 1950 British Empire Games in Auckland, New Zealand, where he won the gold medal in the 51kg Flyweight division.

Riley later turned professional and in early 1954 he moved to the United States.
