= Frank McGurk (boxer) =

British boxer

Personal information
- Nationality: British
- Born: 8 September 1880; Glasgow, Scotland

Sport
- Sport: Boxing

Frank McGurk (born 8 September 1880, date of death unknown) was a British boxer. He competed in the men's bantamweight event at the 1908 Summer Olympics, where he lost to Harry Thomas in his first bout.

McGurk joined the Scottish Amateur Gymnastic Association in 1907 and had his boxing debut in 1908, later becoming the Scottish national champion in the same year. Following the Olympics, McGurk won the Scottish Western District featherweight championship in 1909. After transitioning to competing professionally, McGurk lost to Thomas once again, this time in seven rounds. McGurk chose to be reinstated as an amateur and never fought professionally again.
