= George Henry (wrestler) =

British wrestler (born c. 1926)

Personal information
- Nationality: British (Scottish)
- Born: c.1926 Scotland

Sport
- Sport: Wrestling
- Event(s): Welterweight; Light-heavyweight
- Club: Leith Health & Strength Club

George S. Henry (born c.1926) is a former Scottish wrestler who competed at the British Empire and Commonwealth Games (now Commonwealth Games).

== Biography ==
Henry was a member of the Leith Health & Strength Club in Leith and in 1948 was living at 19 High Street in Alyth. He took part in the trials for the 1948 Summer Olympics and won three titles at the East of Scotland championship in middleweight, light heavyweight and heavyweight before winning the Scottish light heavyweight title one week later.

He was selected for the 1950 Scottish team for the 1950 British Empire Games in Auckland, New Zealand, in the welterweight class, and finished in fourth place behind the gold medal winner Henry Hudson of Canada.
