= John Smillie (boxer) =

Scottish boxer

Personal information
- Nationality: British (Scottish)
- Born: 1 November 1933 (age 92) Scotland

Sport
- Sport: Boxing
- Event: Bantamweight
- Club: Fauldhouse BC
Medal record
Men's Boxing
Representing Scotland
British Empire and Commonwealth Games
| Gold medal – first place | 1954 Vancouver | Bantamweight |

John W. Smillie (born 1 November 1933) is a former boxer from Scotland who won a gold medal at the 1954 British Empire and Commonwealth Games (now Commonwealth Games).

== Biography ==
Smillie became a miner aged 17, working at the Woodmuir Colliery in West Calder. He joined the Fauldhouse Miners Club where he took up boxing.

Boxing out of Faulldhouse BC, he reached the final of the Scottish ABA Championships and was selected to represent Great Britain at the 1952 Summer Olympics, as a reserve to Welshman Dai Dower. He won the ABA bantamweight championship in 1953 and 1954.

He represented the Scottish team at the 1954 British Empire and Commonwealth Games in Vancouver, Canada, where he won the gold medal in the bantamweight division.

Smillie continued working as a miner but later turned professional and fought 46 bouts from March 1955 to October 1962.
