= Roy Rutherford =

British former professional boxer (born 1973)

Personal information
- Nationality: British
- Born: 4 August 1973 (age 52) Coventry, England
- Height: 5 ft 6 in (168 cm)
- Weight: Featherweight; Super featherweight

Boxing career

Boxing record
- Total fights: 22
- Wins: 17
- Win by KO: 7
- Losses: 4
- Draws: 1

Roy Rutherford (born 4 August 1973) is a British former professional boxer who competed from 1998 to 2005. He held the British featherweight title in 2003 and the English super featherweight title from 2004 to 2005.

== Career ==
From Coventry, Rutherford won the ABA lightweight championship in 1995, and started his professional career in February 1998 with a 6-round points win over David Kirk. After winning his first 12 fights he suffered his first defeat in October 2000 when he was outpointed by Richard Evatt at the SkyDome Arena.

After a drawn fight with Nikolay Eremeev in April 2001, he stopped Marc Callaghan, Frederic Bonifai, and Dariusz Snarski in his next three contests.

In May 2003 he challenged for Jamie McKeever's British featherweight title in Liverpool; Rutherford won decisively on points to become British champion. He lost the title in his first defence, In November 2003 to Dazzo Williams.

In February 2004, he stopped Steve Chinnock in four rounds to win the English featherweight title. In June he attempted to regain the British title from Williams but lost on points. He defended his English title in October 2005 against Billy Corcoran at the York Hall, Bethnal Green. He retired in the fourth round. This proved to be Rutherford's final fight.
