= Tommy Miller (boxer) =

Scottish boxer (1929–1992)

Personal information
- Nationality: British (Scottish)
- Born: 1 May 1929 Blackburn, West Lothian, Scotland
- Died: 1 April 1992 (aged 62)

Sport
- Sport: Boxing
- Event: Bantamweight
- Club: Glasgow Transport AAC

Thomas Miller (1 May 1929 – 1 April 1992) was a Scottish boxer who competed at the 1950 British Empire Games (now Commonwealth Games).

== Biography ==
Miller represented Scotland at international level and was the only Scottish boxer to win his bout at both the 1948 and 1949 White Cup against England. He was the 1948 and 1949 Scottish bantamweight champion and was the Great Britain reserve for the 1948 Summer Olympics in London.

A colliery joiner by trade, living at Riddochhill Road, Blackburn, West Lothian, he won the 1949 ABA bantamweight championship. In March 1949, he received a suspensions from the Council of the Western District Association for failing to fulfil a match and a non-attendance at a subsequent meeting.

He represented the Scottish team at the 1950 British Empire Games in Auckland, New Zealand, losing his first round match against eventual gold medal winner Johnny van Rensburg from South Africa.

Miller turned professional in the Summer of 1950 and fought in 38 professional bouts.

Miller died on 1 April 1992, at the age of 62.
