= Dick Currie =

Scottish boxer

Personal information
- Nationality: British (Scottish)
- Born: 1934
- Died: 2021 (aged 87)

Sport
- Sport: Boxing
- Event: Flyweight
- Club: Dalmarnock ABC
Medal record
Men's Boxing
Representing Scotland
British Empire and Commonwealth Games
Gold medal – first place	1954 Vancouver	Flyweight

Richard Currie (1934–2021) was a Scottish flyweight boxer who won a gold medal at the 1954 British Empire and Commonwealth Games (now Commonwealth Games).

== Biography ==
Boxing out of Dalmarnock BC, Currie won the ABA flyweight championship in 1953 and successfully defended the title in 1954.

He represented the Scottish team at the 1954 British Empire and Commonwealth Games in Vancouver, Canada, where he won the gold medal in the flyweight division.

As an amateur, Currie worked as a railway engine-fitter, but later turned professional and fought 16 bouts from 1955 to 1958. After retirement, he became the boxing editor for the Daily Record, a post he held for 40 years.
