= Keith Howlett =

Retired British boxer

Personal information
- Nationality: United Kingdom

Sport
- Sport: Boxing

Keith Howlett is a retired British boxer.

== Boxing career ==
Howlett was twice National Champion when boxing for the Army. In 1988 and 1989 he won the prestigious ABA bantamweight championship.

He represented England in the -54 kg bantamweight division, at the 1990 Commonwealth Games in Auckland, New Zealand.
