= Johnny van Rensburg =

South African boxer (1932–2010)

Personal information
- Nickname: Smiler
- Nationality: South African
- Born: Johnny van Rensburg; 9 May 1932 Lichtenburg, South Africa
- Died: 28 October 2010 (aged 78) Roodepoort, South Africa
- Weight: bantam/light/light welter/welter/middleweight

Boxing career

Boxing record
- Total fights: 48
- Wins: 32 (KO 12)
- Losses: 13 (KO 4)
- Draws: 3
- No contests: 1

Johnny "Smiler" van Rensburg (9 May 1932 – 28 October 2010 (aged 78)) born in Lichtenburg was a South African amateur bantamweight and professional light/light welter/welter/middleweight boxer of the 1950s and '60s who as an amateur won the gold medal at bantamweight in the Boxing at the 1950 British Empire Games in Auckland, New Zealand, and represented South Africa at bantamweight in the Boxing at the 1952 Summer Olympics in Helsinki, Finland, losing to Amé rico Bonetti of Argentina, and as a professional won the Transvaal (South Africa) (White) lightweight title, South African lightweight title, South African welterweight title, British Empire lightweight title, and British Empire welterweight title, his professional fighting weight varied from 132 lb (60 kg; 9 st 6 lb), i.e. lightweight to 148 lb (67 kg; 10 st 8 lb), i.e. Middleweight, he died in Roodepoort, South Africa.
