= Jackie Turner =

Retired English boxer

Personal information
- Nationality: (England) English
- Born: 30 September 1959 (age 66) Hull

Sport
- Sport: Boxing

Jackie Turner (born 1959) is a retired English boxer.

== Boxing career ==
Turner was twice National Champion in 1977 and 1978 after winning the prestigious ABA flyweight title, boxing out of Hull Fish Trades ABC.

He represented England in the -54 kg bantamweight division, at the 1978 Commonwealth Games in Edmonton, Alberta, Canada.

He turned professional on 25 January 1980 and fought in 18 fights.
