= Scotland at the 1950 British Empire Games =

- CGF code: SCO
- CGA: Scotland at the Commonwealth Games
- Website: www.teamscotland.scot

in Auckland, New Zealand
- Medals Ranked 6th: Gold 5 Silver 3 Bronze 2 Total 10

British Empire Games appearances
- 1930; 1934; 1938; 1950; 1954; 1958; 1962; 1966; 1970; 1974; 1978; 1982; 1986; 1990; 1994; 1998; 2002; 2006; 2010; 2014; 2018; 2022; 2026; 2030

Scotland at the 1950 British Empire Games (abbreviated SCO) was the fourth time that the nation had participated at the Games following the appearances in 1930, 1934 and 1938.

The Games were held in Auckland, New Zealand, from 4 to 11 February 1950, following a twelve-year break because of World War II. Scotland came 6th overall in the medal table with five gold, three silver and two bronze medals.

Funds of £6,000 were needed in order for a Scottish team to participate in the Games. Charlie Usher was the team manager. The team were the first to officially declare for the Games.

== Medals ==
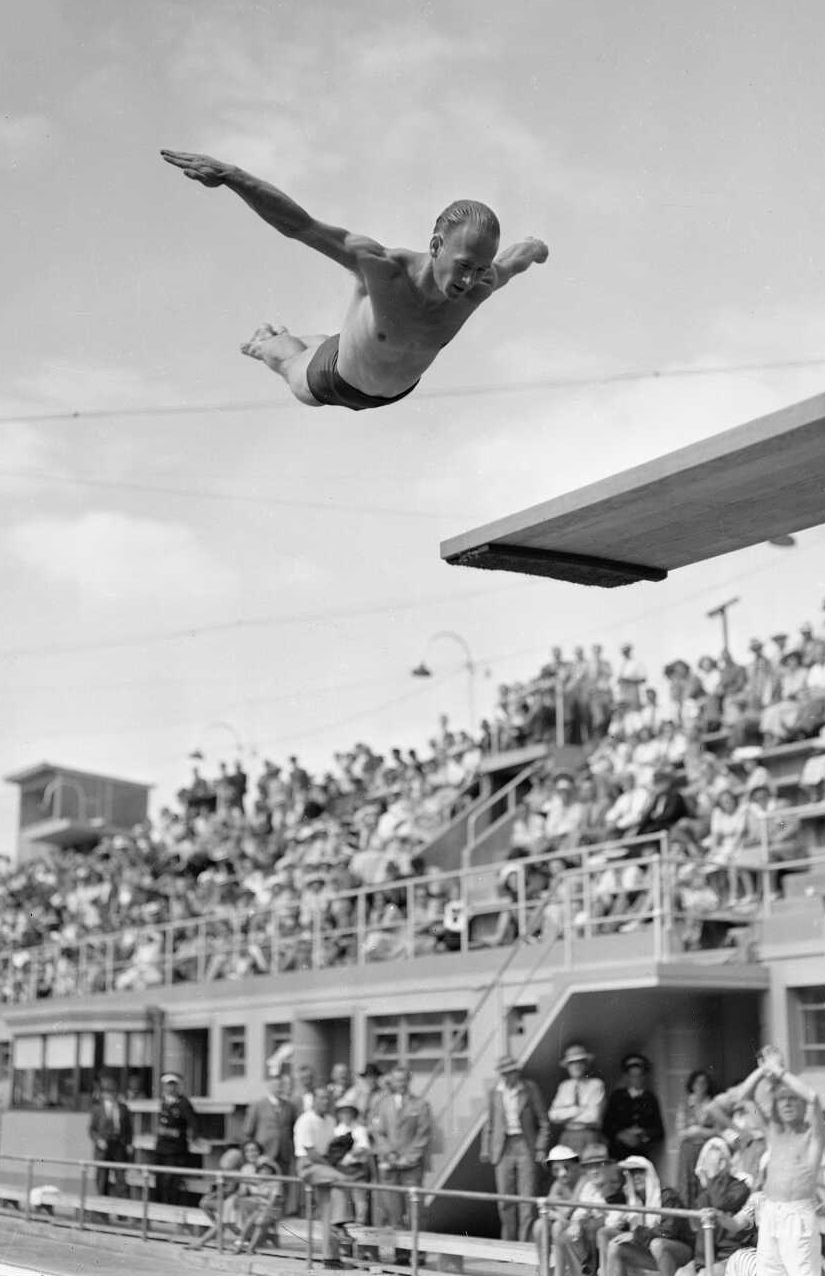
Peter Heatly competing during the Auckland Games

=== Gold ===
- Duncan Clark (athletics)
- Hugh Riley (boxing)
- Henry Gilliland (boxing)
- Peter Heatly (diving)
- Elenor Gordon (swimming)

=== Silver ===
- Andrew Forbes (athletics)
- Alan Paterson (athletics)
- Peter Heatly (diving)

=== Bronze ===
- Bert Kinnear (swimming)
- 3×110 yd medley relay team (swimming)

== Team ==
=== Athletics ===
Men

Athlete	Events	Club	Medals
Duncan Clark	Hammer throw, shot put	Royal Ulster Constabulary	Gold medal
Andrew Forbes	1/3/6 miles	Victoria Park AAC	Silver medal
John Hart	120/440y hurdles	Edinburgh Univ	
Allan Lindsay	Triple Jump	Shotts AC & St Andrews Univ	
Alan Paterson	High jump	Victoria Park AAC	Silver medal
Jack Paterson	marathon	Polytechnic Harriers	

Women

Athlete	Events	Notes	Medals
Emma Anderson	Long Jump	Dumfries AC	

=== Boxing ===
Athlete	Events	Club	Medals
Hugh Riley	Flyweight 51 kg	Gilmerton ABC	Gold medal
Tommy Miller	Bantamweight 54 kg	Glasgow Transport BC	
Henry Gilliland	Featherweight 57 kg	Kilmarnock ABC	Gold medal

=== Cycling ===
Athlete	Events	Club	Medals
Jimmy Hamilton	Road Race, scratch, 4000 Pursuit	Fullarton Wheelers	

=== Diving ===
Athlete	Events	Club	Medals
Peter Heatly	platform, springboard	Portobello	,

=== Fencing ===
Athlete	Events	Club	Medals
Charlie Usher	épée	SFU & Edinburgh Univ	

=== Swimming ===
Men

Athlete	Events	Club	Medals
Bert Kinnear	110y backstroke, 100y freestyle	Arbroath St Thomas & Otter	Bronze medal

Women

Athlete	Events	Club	Medals
Margaret Girvan	110y backstroke, 110y/440y freestyle, relay	Motherwell WP & ASC	Bronze medal
Elenor Gordon	220y breaststroke, relay	Hamilton Ladies	,
Betty Turner	110y freestyle, relay	Galashiels	Bronze medal

=== Weightlifting ===
Athlete	Events	Club	Medals
Hugh Morrison	Light-heavyweight 82.5 kg	Christchurch, New Zealand	

=== Wrestling ===
Athlete	Events	Club	Medals
George Henry	Welterweight 74 kg	Leith Health & Strength Club	

== See also ==
- Scotland at the Commonwealth Games
