= Boxing at the 1908 Summer Olympics =

Coordinates: 51.5274°N 0.1042°W

Boxing at the Games of the IV Olympiad
- Dates: 27 October 1908

At the 1908 Summer Olympics, five boxing events were contested. All of the boxing was conducted on 27 October. The event was held in the Northampton Institute in Clerkenwell, East London.

There were three rounds in each bout, with the first two rounds being three minutes long and the last one going four minutes. Two judges scored the match, giving 5 points to the better boxer in each of the first two rounds and 7 to the better boxer in the third round. Marks were given to the other boxer in proportion to how well he did compared to the better. If the judges were not agreed on a winner at the end of the bout, the referee could either choose the winner or order a fourth round.

== Medal summary ==
Games	Gold	Silver	Bronze
Bantamweight (-52.6 kg / 116 lb)	A. Henry Thomas; Great Britain	John Condon; Great Britain	William Webb; Great Britain
Featherweight (-57.2 kg / 126 lb)	Richard Gunn; Great Britain	Charles Morris; Great Britain	Hugh Roddin; Great Britain
Lightweight (-63.5 kg / 140 lb)	Frederick Grace; Great Britain	Frederick Spiller; Great Britain	Harry Johnson; Great Britain
Middleweight (-71.7 kg / 158 lb)	Johnny Douglas; Great Britain	Reginald Baker; Australasia	William Philo; Great Britain
Heavyweight (over 71.7 kg/158 lb)	Albert Oldman; Great Britain	Sydney Evans; Great Britain	Frank Parks; Great Britain

== Participating nations ==
A total of 42 boxers from 4 nations competed at the London Games:

- Australasia (1)
- Denmark (2)
- France (7)
- Great Britain (32)

== Medal table ==
Rank	Nation	Gold	Silver	Bronze	Total
1	Great Britain	5	4	5	14
2	Australasia	0	1	0	1
Totals (2 entries)		5	5	5	15
