= Américo Bonetti =

Argentine boxer

Personal information
- Born: 22 April 1928; Santa Fe, Argentina
- Died: 14 June 1999 (aged 71); Santa Fe, Argentina

Sport
- Sport: Boxing

Américo Bonetti (22 April 1928 – 14 June 1999) was an Argentine boxer. He competed in the men's lightweight event at the 1952 Summer Olympics.
