= Hendrik van der Linde =

South African boxer

Personal information
- Nationality: South African
- Born: 4 January 1932; Randfontein, South Africa
- Died: 3 July 2003 (aged 71)

Sport
- Sport: Boxing

Hendrik van der Linde (4 January 1932 – 3 July 2003) was a South African boxer. He competed in the men's welterweight event at the 1952 Summer Olympics.
