= Edward Adams (boxer) =

British boxer

Personal information
- Nationality: British

Sport
- Sport: Boxing

Edward Adams was a British boxer. He competed in the 1908 Summer Olympics.
