= George Whelan (boxer) =

English boxer (born 1934)

Personal information
- Nationality: British (English)
- Born: 12 December 1934 (age 91) Acton, London, England

Sport
- Sport: Boxing
- Event: Lightweight
- Club: Army & Chiswick General

George Whelan (born 12 December 1934) is a former boxer who competed for England.

== Boxing career ==
Whelan represented the English team at the 1954 British Empire and Commonwealth Games held in Vancouver, Canada, where he participated in the lightweight category.

He was the 1954 Amateur Boxing Association British lightweight champion, when boxing out of the Army BC.

His younger brother Brian Whelan fought at the 1962 British Empire and Commonwealth Games in Perth, Australia.
