= Frederick Grace =

English boxer

Fred Grace
Personal information
- Nationality: British (English)
- Born: 29 February 1884 Edmonton, London, England
- Died: 23 July 1964 (aged 80) Ilford, London, England

Sport
- Sport: boxing
Medal record
Representing Great Britain
Men's Boxing
Gold medal – first place	1908 London	Lightweight

Frederick Grace (29 February 1884 – 23 July 1964) was a lightweight boxer. He fought as Fred Grace and at the 1908 Olympic Games he became Olympic champion and gold medalist. He also became the British and European amateur champion.

== Biography ==
Born in Edmonton, Middlesex, he first became a boxer at Eton Mission Boxing Club. Using the facilities provided by Eton Mission, he also became proficient on the parallel bars.

In his early twenties, Fred incurred serious damage to his knee after an incident on his motorcycle. Fred declined the surgeon's advice to amputate and was determined to regain his fitness. Subsequently, from that time to the Olympics in 1908, he never figured in any title challenges.

During the Olympic games he was drawn to meet the overall favourite for the completion in the quarter finals, Matt Wells (the future professional Lightweight Champion) where the speed of attack and superior footwork scored Grace an outstanding win. In the final Grace met Fred Spiller where he scored a comfortable win to secure gold.

After the Games, Grace went on to win four Amateur Boxing Association British lightweight titles between 1909 and 1920, when boxing out of the Eton Mission ABC and Eton Boys BC respectively. However, whilst in his prime, boxing was banned from the 1912 Olympics in Stockholm and WW1 canceled out the Olympics of 1916, therefore Grace was unable to defend his title.

By 1920, he was 36 years old. At the Olympics in Antwerp, he won just one bout in the lightweight class before being eliminated by the eventual winner of the title, Samuel Mosberg, of the US.

Grace worked as a heating engineer for most of his life and retired in 1949. He died on 23 July 1964 at Ilford, Essex, aged 80, after being struck by a car while out walking.
