= Hugh Roddin =

Scottish boxer

Olympic medal record

Men's Boxing
Bronze medal – third place	1908 London	Featherweight

Hugh Joseph Roddin (March 10, 1887 – March 3, 1954) was an Olympic boxer from Scotland. He was the first Scottish boxer to win an Olympic boxing medal when he took home the bronze in 1908.

== Biography ==
Roddin, universally known as 'Hughie', was raised in the Newbigging district of Musselburgh in East Lothian. Hughie first came into contact with boxing through legendary Charles 'Charlie' Cotter. Cotter worked as a timekeeper, physical trainer and boxing coach and a dominant figure in Scottish boxing. Hughie rapidly won two Scottish Eastern District Featherweight Titles under Cotter's guidance. Even better was to follow in the years 1907-08, when he went on to win the Scottish Amateur Featherweight Title.

He won a silver trophy in an open boxing championship at the Pavilion Theatre in Musselburgh in 1906. The building he trained and fought in is being refurbished and used as a museum of Scottish boxing, including a display of Hugh Roddin memorabilia.

Hugh Roddin won his bronze medal at the 1908 London Olympics. He was a featherweight (57 kg). They had not originally planned to include boxing in the 1908 Olympics, so it was held after all of the other events in October. His fight was a 37 bout marathon session that started at 11:25 am and went until 10:30 pm. Because it was held after all the other events, 32 of the 42 entrants were from Great Britain, including all of the featherweight medalists. Of the ten overseas entrants, nine were defeated in their first bout.

In 1911, Roddin emigrated to the United States.

Roddin had a 23 win and no loss record, according to author and journalist Brian Donald, in his research for a book on Scottish boxing history entitled The Fight Game in Scotland. This book devotes a complete chapter to Hugh Roddin. One of the fights was held in the old Vanderbilt Athletic Club in the Ninth Ward before World War I. In an extract that appeared in 1954 in the now-defunct Brooklyn News, Hughie Roddin, the great featherweight, was a real star. During a contest in Brooklyn's Vanderbilt Club, he knocked out his opponent with a crushing blow in the first round. The club owners asked Roddin if he would go in with the same opponent after a 10-minute interval; Roddin agreed and knocked the same guy out again! Roddin's career in the ring ended during World War One when he served in the U.S. Army's 35th Division.

On returning, he ran several youth soccer teams in Brooklyn and athletics teams based at a gym he owned there. Roddin became the boxing coach at the American Legion in Rosedale, Long Island, New York, and taught his nephew Harold (Sonny) and many other boys the finer points of boxing. Sonny would go from Bayside to Rosedale many a Saturday night, go to the Legion, and then go home.

Hugh Roddin (Hugh's nephew) tells a story that when Hugh Roddin was in his late years, he was approached in the park by a mugger to give up his wallet. Hugh reached into his coat as if to grab the wallet - and came out with a punch to knock the young man down. The young man was so stunned he got up and ran away. Hugh had said that an old boxer never loses his punch.

He died at age 66 in Brooklyn in 1954 and is buried at Long Island's National Cemetery in Farmingdale, New York.

The boxing gloves Roddin used to win his Olympic medal now belong to author Brian Donald's grandson Ruaridh. They were given to Brian Donald as a show of appreciation by Roddin's family in the US for his work on the fighter in The Fight Game in Scotland, a history of Scottish boxing. They were on display in the National Museum of Scotland until its refurbishment in 2015 and are now being stored in a Scottish university's archive.
