= James Beal (boxer) =

New Zealand boxer (1929–1996)

Jimmy Beal
- Born: James Brian Beal; 29 January 1929; Invercargill, New Zealand
- Died: 1 October 1996 (aged 67)
- Height: 171 cm (5 ft 7 in)
- Weight: 70.9 kg (156 lb; 11 st 2 lb)
- Division: Middleweight

Professional boxing record
- Total: 8
- Wins: 3
- By knockout: 2
- Losses: 5
- By knockout: 2
- Draws: 0

Other information
- Occupation: Boxer, artist
- Spouse: Colleen Beal (m. 1967)
- Children: 2
- Boxing record from BoxRec

James Brian Beal (13 January 1929 – 1 October 1996) was a New Zealand boxer. He won the silver medal in the men's middleweight division at the 1950 British Empire Games.

Beal moved to Australia and continued boxing in Melbourne (he trained at Palmers Gym Footscray), Sydney, and Brisbane. While boxing he also worked on the wharfs in Melbourne. When he retired from boxing Beal owned and operated a signwriting business in Crows Nest, North Sydney. Beal married Colleen in 1967, they had two boys John and Guy. Beal and his family moved to Brisbane in 1970. Beal had always loved drawing with Indian Ink and oil painting and was a member of the Redcliffe Art Society.

The last few years of his life he travelled throughout Australia, painting portraits of Australians and landscapes. He also competed in fun runs in Sydney and Brisbane.

== Professional boxing record ==
3 wins (2 knockouts, 1 decisions), 5 losses (2 knockouts, 3 decisions), 0 draws
Res.	Record	Opponent	Type	Rd., Time	Date	Location	Notes
Win	3–5	(New Zealand) Jack O'Leary	KO	7, (15)	12 May 1952	Royal Wanganui Opera House, Wanganui, New Zealand	vacant New Zealand Boxing Association middleweight title
Loss	2–5	(Australia) George Kapeen	TKO	3, (12)	12 January 1952	Newcastle Stadium, Newcastle, New South Wales, Australia	
Loss	2–4	(Australia) Don 'Bronco' Johnson	KO	3, (12) 1:12	20 August 1951	Sydney Stadium, Sydney, New South Wales, Australia	
Win	2–3	(Estonia) (Australia) Johnny Virm	PTS	12	10 November 1950	Brisbane Stadium, Brisbane, Queensland, Australia	
Loss	1–3	(Australia) Jack Smith	PTS	10	27 July 1950	Sydney Stadium, Sydney, New South Wales, Australia	
Loss	1–2	(Australia) Al Bourke	PTS	8	6 May 1950	West Melbourne Stadium, Melbourne, Victoria, Australia	
Loss	1–1	(Australia) Snowy Boyd	PTS	12	29 April 1950	West Melbourne Stadium, Melbourne, Victoria, Australia	
Win	1–0	(Australia) Cliff Kenworthy	KO	6, (8)	24 March 1950	West Melbourne Stadium, Melbourne, Victoria, Australia	
