= Thomas Ringer =

British boxer

Personal information
- Nationality: British (English)
- Born: 1883
- Died: 1969 (aged 85–86)

Sport
- Sport: Boxing

Thomas Ringer (1883–1969) was a British boxer. He competed in the men's featherweight event at the 1908 Summer Olympics. He fought as Tom Ringer.

Ringer won the 1906 Amateur Boxing Association British bantamweight title, when boxing out of the Lynn ABC.
