= Irene Charnley =

South African trade unionist and businesswoman

- Born: 6 May 1960 (age 66); Cape Flats, Cape Town, South Africa
- Occupation: Businesswoman
- Known for: Being a trade unionist who became a successful African businesswoman

Irene Charnley (born 6 May 1960) is a former trade unionist and businesswoman from South Africa.

== Career ==
Charnley first made her mark on the African business community as a negotiator for South Africa's National Union of Mineworkers where she spent 13 years coordinating various divisions of union operations. She went on to become an executive director for the MTN Group, which is Africa's largest telecommunications company. Under her leadership several African and Middle Eastern countries (including Nigeria and Iran) were connected into the MTN network. Charnley was behind the founding of the National Empowerment Consortium made up of 50% black business owners and 50% black African laborers. They eventually owned 35% of Johnnic Holdings (now called Johnnic Communications).

Charnley left MTN under controversial conditions but she was worth US$150 million when she left. In August 2000 she was awarded the title of Businesswoman of the Year for her outstanding contribution to taking Johnnic from an industrial conglomerate to a modern telecommunications media group. During her time at Johnnic (from 1996 to the late-2000s) 32,000 disadvantaged South Africans bought shares in the company. Financial returns over a three-year time span has made these 32,000 African residents 400% wealthier than they were before buying the shares. A more recent award made Charnley one of the top 50 businesswomen outside of the United States.

Charnley is currently the CEO of Smile Telecoms Holdings Ltd, a Mauritius-based Pan-African telecommunications group with operations in Nigeria, Tanzania, Uganda, the Democratic Republic of the Congo and South Africa.

Forbes listed her among "Africa's 50 Most Powerful Women" in 2020.
