= Terry Ratcliffe =

Boxer who competed for England

Personal information
- Nationality: British (English)
- Born: 19 August 1930 Bristol, England
- Died: 21 June 1999 (aged 68)
Medal record
Boxing
Representing England
British Empire Games
Gold medal – first place	1950 Auckland	67kg

Terence Samuel T Ratcliffe (1930-1999) was a male boxer who competed for England.

== Boxing career ==
He represented England and won a gold medal in the 67 Kg division at the 1950 British Empire Games in Auckland, New Zealand.

He was part of Royal Air Force and Bristol Boxing Clubs and fought in 51 professional bouts and won the 63rd Amateur Boxing Association British welterweight title, when boxing for the Royal Air Force.

== Personal life ==
He was in the Royal Air Force and his cousin was Josser Watling.

He married Barbara Hacker and has one child Christine Ratcliffe.
