= Edmond Poillot =

French boxer

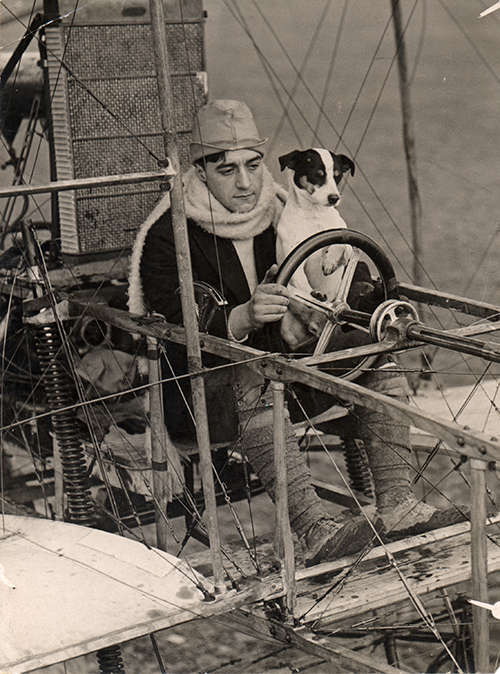
- Edmond Poillot flying a Voisin biplane with a dog, Smithsonian National Air and Space Museum

Personal information
- Nationality: French
- Born: 28 January 1888
- Died: 25 September 1910 (aged 22)

Sport
- Sport: Boxing

Edmond (Note: The given name of the French boxer Poillot is in fact Edmond, and not Étienne as he is sometimes called by mistake. The error stems from the fact that often only the initial of his given name was mentioned in newspaper articles.) Poillot, (28 January 1888 – 25 September 1910) was a French journalist, pioneer aviation pilot and amateur boxer. He competed in the men's featherweight event at the 1908 Summer Olympics.

Chief pilot at the Savary's aviation school in Chartres (Eure-et-Loir, France), he died in a plane crash on 25 September 1910 while on a flight with a pupil in the suburbs of the city.
