= Josser Watling =

English footballer (1925–2023)

Personal information
- Full name: John Daniel Watling
- Date of birth: 11 May 1925
- Place of birth: Bristol, England
- Date of death: 3 June 2023 (aged 98)
- Positions: Outside left; left back

Senior career*
Years	Team	Apps	(Gls)
1945–1963	Bristol Rovers	323	(19)
- * Club domestic league appearances and goals

John Daniel Watling (11 May 1925 – 3 June 2023), known as Josser Watling, was an English professional footballer who played in The Football League for Bristol Rovers between 1945 and 1963.

Watling was a one-club man, whose only senior team was Bristol Rovers. Prior to joining The Pirates, he played for Plain House Youth Club, the Royal Navy, and St Andrew's Boys Club in Avonmouth, and he also had an unsuccessful trial at Plymouth Argyle at the end of the Second World War. He joined Bristol Rovers in October 1945, initially as an amateur, before signing his first professional contract in January 1947.

After having made 323 League appearances and scoring 19 goals, Watling retired from playing in 1963 but remained with the club for a further two years as a coach and scout before finally leaving in 1965 after spending twenty years with them.

Following his retirement from football, he worked as a storekeeper at Glenside Hospital in Bristol. He was also the cousin of boxer Terry Ratcliffe, who won the gold medal in the welterweight division at the 1950 British Empire Games. As of 2019, Watling was noted as being Bristol Rovers' oldest living player.

On 30 April 2021, it was announced that Watling would become the final of the ten initial inductees into the Bristol Rovers Hall of Fame.

Watling died on 3 June 2023, at the age of 98.
