= Peter Brander =

British boxer

Personal information
- Nationality: British
- Born: 20 July 1927 Southampton, England
- Died: 2 April 2013 (aged 85) Charvil, England

Sport
- Sport: Boxing
Medal record
Boxing
Representing England
British Empire Games
Bronze medal – third place	1950 Auckland	57kg

Peter Brander (20 July 1927 – 2 April 2013) was a British boxer. Brander competed in the men's featherweight event at the 1948 Summer Olympics. He represented England and won a bronze medal in the 57 kg division at the 1950 British Empire Games in Auckland, New Zealand.

He won the 1946, 1948 and 1950 Amateur Boxing Association British featherweight title, when boxing out of the Slough Centre ABC.

== 1948 Olympic results ==
Below is the record of Peter Brander, a British featherweight boxer who competed at the 1948 London Olympics:

- Round of 32: lost to Mohamed Ammi (France) on points
