= Sam Charnley =

Scottish footballer

Personal information
- Full name: Samuel Charnley
- Date of birth: 18 November 1902
- Place of birth: Wishaw, Scotland
- Date of death: 1977
- Height: 5 ft 10 in (1.78 m)
- Position: Defender

Senior career*
Years	Team	Apps	(Gls)
?–1925	Burnbank Athletic		
1925–1928	Wolverhampton Wanderers	52	(1)
1928–1929	York City	48	(4)
1929	Dartford		
1929–1931	Kettering Town		
- * Club domestic league appearances and goals

Samuel Charnley (18 November 1902 – 1977) was a Scottish footballer who played for Wolverhampton Wanderers in the Football League.

== Career ==
Born in Craigneuk, a suburb of Wishaw, North Lanarkshire, Charnley played for Burnbank Athletic before joining Wolverhampton Wanderers of the Football League Second Division in January 1925. He made his debut on 12 September 1925 in a 4–1 win against Portsmouth. After making 55 appearances in total, scoring once, he joined Midland League team York City in August 1928.

He captained York in the 1928–29 season, which was to be their last in the Midland League before being elected to the Football League. He left after making 55 appearances and scoring five goals to join Dartford in June 1929. He joined Kettering Town in September, before returning to Scottish football in May 1931.

== Personal life ==
When Charnley joined Dartford, he secured jobs locally for family members who also moved to Kent; these included his brother and his wife, who were the parents of boxer Dave Charnley, born in the town in 1935. Sam later ran a pub in Dartford.
