= Jim Barnden =

New Zealand boxer (1926–1986)

Medal record

Representing New Zealand

Men's Boxing

British Empire Games
Bronze medal – third place	1950 Auckland	Lightweight

James Edwin Barnden (23 June 1926 – 29 December 1986) was a New Zealand boxer.

He won the bronze medal in the men's lightweight (57–60 kg) division at the 1950 British Empire Games.
