= Piet van Vuuren =

South African boxer (1931-2008)

Personal information
- Born: 6 February 1931 Johannesburg, South Africa
- Died: 2008 (aged 76–77)
Medal record
Men's Boxing
Representing South Africa
Commonwealth Games
Gold medal – first place	1954 Vancouver	Light Heavyweight

Piet van Vuuren (6 February 1931 – 2008) was a South African boxer. He was born in Johannesburg. He competed at the 1956 Summer Olympics in Melbourne, in the light heavyweight class.
