= John Condon (boxer) =

British boxer

Johnny Condon
Personal information
- Nationality: British (English)
- Born: 28 February 1889 Shoreditch, London, England
- Died: 21 February 1919 (aged 29) Shoreditch, London, England

Sport
- Sport: boxing
Medal record
Representing Great Britain
Men's Boxing
Silver medal – second place	1908 London	Bantamweight

John Condon (28 February 1889 – 21 February 1919) was a British bantamweight professional boxer who competed in the early twentieth century. He fought as Johnny Condon and died a week prior to his 30th birthday of influenza.

Condon won a silver medal in Boxing at the 1908 Summer Olympics

He won the 1909 Amateur Boxing Association British bantamweight title, when boxing out of the Lynn ABC.
