= Richard Gunn (boxer) =

English boxer

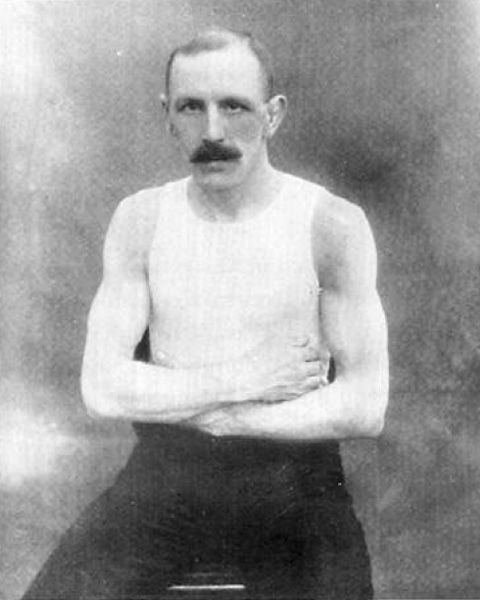
- Gunn at 1908 Olympics in London

Personal information
- Born: 16 February 1871 Charing Cross, London, England
- Died: 23 June 1961 (aged 90) Lambeth, London, England
Medal record
Men's boxing
Representing Great Britain
Olympic Games
Gold medal – first place	1908 London	Featherweight

Richard Kenneth Gunn (16 February 1871 – 23 June 1961) was a British boxer, and is the oldest man to win an Olympic boxing crown ever. He achieved this feat at the age of 37 years and 254 days.

== Biography ==
He was born in Charing Cross, London and died in Lambeth, London.

Gunn took up boxing at the Surrey Commercial Docks Boxing Club in 1893 after joining his father's East End tailoring business. He won the 1894, 1895 and 1896 Amateur Boxing Association British featherweight title when boxing out of the various clubs.

He was so much better than his rivals at the time that authorities asked him to retire after he won his third ABA title. Gunn did so, but in 1908, having served on the ABA council for more than ten years, he returned to win the Olympic title before hanging up his gloves for good. Gunn died in London at the age of 90, having only lost one fight in fifteen years.

== 1908 Olympic results ==
Below is the record of Richard Gunn, a British featherweight boxer who competed at the 1908 London Olympics:

- Quarterfinal: defeated Etienne Poillot (France) by second-round knockout
- Semifinal: defeated Thomas Ringer (Great Britain) by decision, 2–0
- Final: defeated Charles Morris (Great Britain) by decision, 2–0 (won gold medal)
