= Alex Obeysekere =

Sri Lankan boxer

Medal record

Men's Boxing

Representing Ceylon

British Empire Games
| Bronze medal – third place | 1950 Auckland | Welterweight |

Alexander Indrajith Obeysekere (March 1918 – 28 April 2002) was a Ceylonese sportsman. He won a Bronze medal at the 1950 British Empire Games. He was the welterweight champion in the 1940s and was a member of the Ceylon contingent to the 1948 Olympic Games. He went on the represented Ceylon in boxing in 1950 Commonwealth Games in Auckland winning the Bronze medal in welterweight.

He was born in Colombo to Donald Obeyesekere and was educated the Royal College, Colombo.
