= Dave Charnley =

British boxer (1935–2012)

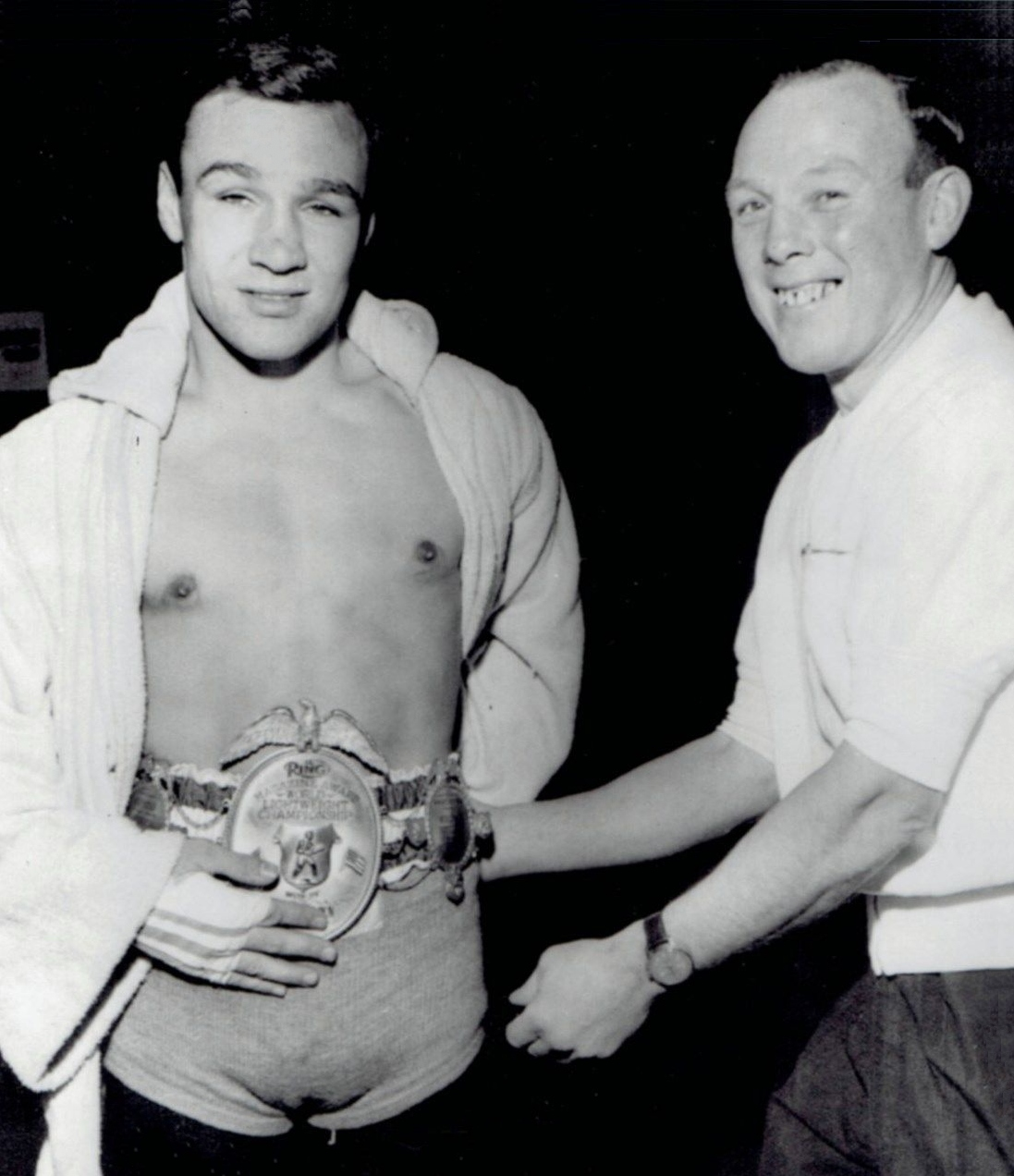
- Charnley with manager Arthur Boggis in 1959

Personal information
- Nickname: The Dartford Destroyer
- Nationality: English
- Born: David Fraser Charnley; 10 October 1935 Dartford, England
- Died: 3 March 2012 (aged 76) Dartford, England
- Weight: Lightweight

Boxing career
- Stance: Southpaw

Boxing record
- Total fights: 61
- Wins: 48
- Win by KO: 27
- Losses: 12
- Draws: 1
Medal record
Representing England
British Empire and Commonwealth Games
Bronze medal – third place	1954 Vancouver	Featherweight

David Fraser Charnley (10 October 1935 – 3 March 2012) was an English lightweight boxer considered to be one of the greatest British fighters in his weight class. Known as "The Dartford Destroyer", the left-handed Charnley had a 10-year career lasting from 1954 to 1964.

Charnley won a bronze medal at the 1954 Commonwealth Games and went on to become undefeated British lightweight champion (1957–63), Commonwealth lightweight champion (1959–62) and European lightweight champion (1960–61).

== World champion title fights ==
Charnley made two unsuccessful world title challenges against his arch-rival Joe 'Old Bones' Brown. He was stopped by Brown on a cut eye in Houston, Texas, in 1959 and was narrowly out-pointed in a controversial 15 round bout in London on 18 April 1961. Ring Magazine called this second bout "Fight of the Year." Many say Charnley should have won. The decision is still contested by Charnley and most British writers.

He eventually defeated Brown in six rounds in a non-title fight in Manchester on 25 February 1963.

== Early life and career ==
Charnley was born in Dartford, Kent, to Scottish parents from Craigneuk, Lanarkshire. His uncle was footballer Sam Charnley who had a spell at Dartford F.C. and secured jobs locally for family members who also moved to Kent. Before becoming a boxer, Charnley worked at Vickers Engineering Crayford as a boilermaker. He started competing in 1954 and turned professional the same year. He represented the English team at the 1954 British Empire and Commonwealth Games held in Vancouver, Canada, where he won the bronze medal in the featherweight category.

He became British Lightweight Champion at 21 by outpointing Joe Lucy, another southpaw, on 9 April 1957, but in his first attempt later that year to win the Empire title on 9 July he was beaten on points by Willie Toweel. In 1958 he met future world champion, Puerto Rican Carlos Ortiz at Harringay Arena where he lost on a 10 round decision.

In a return match against Willie Toweel on 12 May 1959, Dave Charnley punched with such authority that the championship changed hands in the 10th round, when Dave won by a knockout.

Dave challenged for the World Title at Houston, Texas on 2 December 1959, against Joe Brown but was forced to retire in the fifth round with a badly damaged eye. He fought Brown again, this time in London on 18 April 1961, and lost a bitterly contested duel that many fans thought he had won. By way of consolation Dave knocked out Brown in six rounds in a third meeting, but only after the American had lost his World title.

Before his second bout with Brown, Dave added the European Lightweight Title to his British and Empire Titles, when he met Mario Vecchiatto of Italy on 29 March 1960. He forced Vecchiatto to retire in the 10th round.

On 20 November 1961 Dave Charnley met challenger David "Darkie" Hughes of Wales for his third title and stopped the Welshman in 40 seconds, including the count, a record win in the British Lightweight class.

In 1962 Dave went to Jamaica, losing his Empire title on a close point verdict to Bunny Grant, but he won his Lonsdale Belt outright by defeating Maurice Cullen in Manchester on 20 May 1963. That year he also forfeited his European title.

As there were no worthy challengers in the Lightweight division, to continue boxing, it was necessary for Dave to move up to the Welterweight division. He was then game enough to challenge the World Champion, Emile Griffith, but took a bad beating and the fight was stopped in round eight.

Dave retired from the ring in 1964 as unbeaten British Lightweight Champion.

== Aggressive fighting style ==
Charnley had a powerful build and large forearms and was often compared to Mickey Walker, known as the "Toy Bulldog". He was known for his double and triple hooks.

His trademark was an aggressive attacking style. Quiet-spoken and an introvert outside the ropes, his self-effacing modesty was no public relations gimmick; Charnley was merciless once ring battle commenced. Inside the ring he was a furious brawler who gave and took brutal punishment.

Only Joe Brown stopped him on cuts and until his last fight, only welterweight great Emile Griffiths stopped him from going the distance. Charnley ended his career fighting welterweights and was a tough opponent for anyone.

== After the ring ==
Charnley estimated his ring earnings to have been in excess of £400,000, a considerable sum at the time, and when he retired from boxing in 1964 he took a different direction in his life and opened and operated hair salons, which became quite profitable for him.

He later moved into building and property refurbishments buying land and building estates in the Dartford area. He established the offices of his company in Regent Street, where the business expanded through restorations of hotels and other projects. His various business enterprises generated him a lot of money late in his life.

Charnley's biographer, James Kirkwood, said: "It may be a cliché, but it really was true of Dave that you never heard anybody say a bad word about him." Charnley died of lung cancer on 3 March 2012, at the age of 76.

== See also ==
- List of British lightweight boxing champions

== Sources ==
- Henry Cooper's 100 Greatest Boxers (Henry Cooper, Queen Anne Press, 1990) page 32
- The Ring Record Book & Boxing Encyclopaedia 1959 (Nat Fleischer, The Ring Book Shop Inc., 1959) page 5
- The Dartford Destroyer: The Life and Career of Dave Charnley by James Kirkwood; Dalcumly Press (10 August 2011); ISBN 0-9569253-0-8; ISBN 978-0-9569253-0-5
