= 1908–09 Rugby Union County Championship =

English rugby union competition

1908–09 County Championship
- Countries: England
- Champions: Durham (6th title)
- Runners-up: Cornwall

The 1908–09 Rugby Union County Championship was the 21st edition of England's premier rugby union club competition at the time.

Durham won the competition for the sixth time defeating Cornwall in the final. It was Durham's tenth consecutive final appearance.

== Final ==
27 March 1909

Durham	12–0	Cornwall
Try: Coverdale, Chapman; Con: Coverdale; Drop: Taylor

Old Friarage, Hartlepool
Referee: J. D. Dallas (Scottish Rugby Union)

D Ellwood	Hartlepool Rovers
Fred Chapman	Westoe
Jack Taylor (capt)	Winlaton Vulcans
J Rickard	North Durham
P Watson	Hartlepool Rovers
Harry Coverdale	Hartlepool Rovers
J Thompson	Hartlepool Rovers
Dr Robertson	Hartlepool Rovers
George Carter	Hartlepool Rovers
J Fowler	North Durham
G Robson	Westoe
K Johnson	Durham City
G Burrell	Winlaton Vulcans
J Whitfield	Winlaton Vulcans
Jimmy Duthie	Winlaton Vulcans

John Jackett (capt)	Leicester
Barrie Bennetts	Penzance
Bert Solomon	Redruth
Frederick Dean	Devonport Albion
Thomas Wedge	St Ives
James Davey	Redruth
Richard Jackett	Falmouth
Nicholas Tregurtha	St Ives
L Browett	Redruth
E C Marshall	Devonport Albion
B Westaway	Falmouth
D J Coombs	Devonport Albion
Arthur Wilson	Camborne School of Mines
Dr R C 'Chummy' Lawry	Redruth
A Willcocks	Devonport Albion

== See also ==
- English rugby union system
- Rugby union in England
