= 1907–08 Rugby Union County Championship =

English rugby union competition

1907–08 County Championship
- Countries: England
- Champions: Cornwall (1st title)
- Runners-up: Durham

The 1907–08 Rugby Union County Championship was the 20th edition of England's premier rugby union club competition at the time.

Cornwall won the competition for the first time in front of 17,000 spectators defeating Durham in the final at Redruth 17-3 scoring 5 tries through Solomon (2) Tregurtha, Bennetts and Davey. It was Durham's ninth consecutive final appearance.

== Final ==
28 March 1908

Cornwall	17–3	Durham
Try: x5 Bennetts, Solomon, Tregurtha; Con: Jackson		Pen: Adamson

Redruth

John Jackett (capt)	Leicester
Barrie Bennetts	Devonport Albion
Bert Solomon	Redruth
Frederick Dean	Devonport Albion
Jimmy Jose	Devonport Albion
Thomas Wedge	St Ives
James Davey	Redruth
Jumbo Milton	Camborne School of Mines
Arthur Wilson	Camborne School of Mines
Frederick Jackson	Leicester
Richard Jackett	Falmouth
A J Thomas	Devonport Albion
Dr R C 'Chummy' Lawry	Redruth
R Davey	Redruth
Nicholas Tregurtha	St Ives

D Ellwood	Hartlepool Rovers
C Adamson (capt)	Durham City
P Watson	Hartlepool Rovers
A Emerson	West Hartlepool
Henry Imrie	Durham City
J Thompson	Hartlepool Rovers
J Knaggs	Hartlepool Rovers
George Summerscale	Durham City
George Carter	Hartlepool Rovers
S Brittain	Hartlepool Rovers
Frank Boylen	Hartlepool Rovers
Harry Havelock	West Hartlepool
W H Phillips	Durham City
Jimmy Duthie	Winlaton Vulcans
Tom Hogarth	Hartlepool Rovers

== See also ==
- English rugby union system
- Rugby union in England
