= Rugby union in Cornwall (before 1900) =

Rugby union in Cornwall (before 1900) is a timeline of rugby union in Cornwall in the 19th century.

== History ==
Richard Carew in his Survey of Cornwall (1602) gives some laws of a game which has similarities to rugby.

- "Two bushes are pitched in the ground eight or twelve feet asunder, directly against which at a distance of ten or twelve yards apart two more bushes in like manner, which are called goals.
- ″The hurlers to goal are bound to observe these orders or Laws:″
  - ″In contending for the ball, if a man's body touches the ground, and he cries Hold and delivers the ball, he is not to be further pressed.″ (the mark)
  - ″That the hurler must deal no foreball, or throw it to any partner standing nearer the goal than himself.″ (the forward pass)
  - ″In dealing the ball, if any of the adverse party can catch it flying .... the property of it is thereby transferred to the catching party; and so the assailants become defendants, and the defendants assailants.″ (the interception)
- ″A breach made in any of these Articles is motive sufficient for the hurlers going together by the ears; nor do any seek to take revenge but in the same matter.″ (the scrum).

Before 1900, rugby union in Cornwall was referred to as football and what is known today as football was then called ″association″ or soccer. Before the formation of the Cornwall RFU in 1884, the press did not consistently record rugby matches so it is uncertain when it was first played in Cornwall. The first recorded rugby match in Penzance is from 1870, played in the grounds of Poltair House, Heamoor and organised by W Borlase of Marlborough School. The Penzance team was mostly public schoolboys, home on holiday, and their opponents, the Eastern Telegraph Company was based in Porthcurno. In Penryn, before 1872 a team made up of workers from Freeman's granite yard played a team from Sara's Foundry in a field near the Cross Keys hotel. In the main, rugby was mainly confined to the western half of Cornwall, from Penzance in the west to Truro in the east.

== 1883–84 ==
=== Friendly ===
12 January 1884

Devon	2 goals, 3 tries – nil	Cornwall
Try: E W Chillcott, Hibberd, Anon, Cooper (2); Con: Dryden (2)

Cricket Ground, South Devon Place, Plymouth
Referee: W Harcourt Stiles (Devon Union). Umpires: Mr Richardson (Devon) and Mr Bailey (Cornwall)

Cornwall. Backs: Bernard F Edyvean, capt. (Bodmin), A Trounson (Penzance), Three-quarters: J W Everett (Redruth), E P P Tyacke (Helston), W H Willcocks (Tregony), Half-backs: G Eustice (Hayle), Luke Smith (Redruth), Forwards: G H Chilcott (Truro), N Harvey (Hayle), E H Ratcliffe (Helston), R C Jones (Pool), C Barrett (Hayle), W Rowe (Hayle), W Rowe (Redruth) and F Bond (Camborne).

- Cornwall's first match.

== 1884–85 ==
=== Friendly ===
10 January 1885

Devon	1 goal – nil	Cornwall

Plymouth

== 1885–86 ==
=== Friendly ===
12 December 1885

Devon	1 goal – 1 try	Cornwall

South Devon Grounds, Plymouth

Cornwall. Messrs E P P Tyacke, White (Tregony), G Kistler (Penzance), Luke (Truro) and J H Genn, captain (Falmouth) mentioned in the match report.

- Cornwall's try was their first.

=== Friendly ===
23 January 1886

Cornwall	0 – 2 goals	Devon

Recreation Ground, Redruth

== 1886–87 ==
=== Friendly ===
1 January 1887

Cornwall	0 – 1 try	Devon
		Try: Hamilton

Redruth
Attendance: 2,000

Cornwall. Fullback; J B Cornish capt. (Penzance), Three-quarters; Kistler, (Penzance), T Smith (Redruth), Thomas (Penryn), Half-backs; T J Peak (Penzance), T Edwards (Camborne), Forwards; Fitzgerald (Falmouth), Wolf (Redruth), J Henwood (Camborne), Vincent (Penryn), A S Grylls (Redruth), R Chappell (Camborne), Boskeen (Redruth), Chilcott (Truro).

15 January 1887

Devon	0 – 2 tries	Cornwall

Exeter
Referee: Stiles

Cornwall. Fullback; Hall (Penryn), Three-quarters; Kistler, (Penzance), W Smith (Redruth), T Smith (Redruth), Half-backs; Peake (Penzance), Edwards (Camborne), Forwards; J Luke (Redruth), J Henwood (Camborne), Wolf (Redruth), Thomas (Redruth), Northey (Hayle), Sincock (Hayle), Pryor (Hayle), Vincent (Penryn), Jenkins (Camborne)

== 1892–93 ==
=== County Championship ===
23 November 1892

Gloucestershire	19 – 0	Cornwall

Bristol

- This was Cornwall's first match in the County Championship. Gloucester scored 3 goals and 2 tries.

10 December 1892

Devon	20 – 0	Cornwall

Bladderly, Plymouth

- Devon scored 2 goals and 5 tries.
- The match with Somerset was cancelled by the Somerset secretary ″on account of gate difficulties″.

=== Friendly ===
14 January 1893

Cornwall	3 – 0	Devon
Try: 1

Recreation Ground, Redruth

Cornwall. Back: Blewett, Three-quarters: Kistler, W D Lawry (Penzance), H Carvolth (Redruth), Phillips, Halves: W Paull (Redruth), Gray (Redruth), Forwards: Grylls, W F Woolf (Redruth), N James (Redruth), Williams, J Nancarrow (Redruth), Thorne, Masters and Berry.

== 1894–95 ==
=== County Championship ===
South-western group	P	W	D	L	F	A	Pts
Devon	3	3	0	0			6
Somerset	3	2	0	1			4
Gloucestershire	3	1	0	2			2
Cornwall	3	0	0	3	11	47	0

17 November 1894

Cornwall	8 – 16 (5 – 3)	Somerset
Try: Triggs; Paige; Con: Viant		Try: Mermagen; Westcott; Gilmore; Woods; Drop: McLier

Penzance
Attendance: 1200
Referee: Fred Hall

- Eight Cornish players made their championship debut. Three Somerset players were England internationals.

1 December 1894

Cornwall	0 – 23 (0 – 13)	Devon
		Try: Hawkings c Stoyle c A N Other; Bildings c Thomas c Con: Hocken (4)

Redruth
Referee: Mr T Peak (Penzance)

- Full-back: J Eathorne (Redruth). Three-quarters: A G Chapman (Falmouth), J Thomas (Redruth), J Viant (Redruth), S Hosking (Camborne). Halves: W Paull (Redruth), Paige (Falmouth). Forwards: Caselet (Camborne), R Johns (Camborne), D. Campbell (Camborne), O Triggs (Penzance), S Wesley (Redruth), C Pearce (Redruth), Trerise (Falmouth) and W Smith (Falmouth).

8 December 1894

Gloucestershire	8 – 3	Cornwall
Try: Bowley; Lockyer; Con: Hames		Pen: Tarbutt

Gloucester
Attendance: 5000

- Full-back: J Eathorne (Redruth). Three-quarters: A G Chapman (Falmouth), J Thomas (Redruth), S Hosking (Camborne), J W Nunn (Penzance). Halves: W Paull (Redruth), E L Hammond. Forwards: R Johns (Camborne), D. Campbell (Camborne), P C Tarbutt, C A P Tarbutt, H Olivey, A Kitson, F A L Hammond and O Triggs (Penzance).
- Debuts: J W Nunn, E L Hammond, F A L Hammond, C A P Tarbutt, A Kitson.

=== Cornish Rugby League ===
The first season of the Cornish Rugby League consisted of five clubs, although one did not have any fixtures with the other competitors! Redruth became champions following their win at Camborne, in what was, the final league match of the season.

1894–95 Cornish Rugby League
Pos	Team	P	W	D	L	Goals for	Tries for	Goals against	Tries against	Pts	Notes
1	Redruth	6	3	2	1	3	2	1	2	8
2	Penzance	6	3	0	3	0	6	3	4	6
3	Camborne	5	2	1	2	1	1	0	2	5
4	Falmouth	5	1	1	3	2	3	2	3	3
Points are awarded as follows: 2 points for a win; 1 points for a draw; 0 points for a loss

4 April 1895

Redruth	nil – 1 try	Rest of the league
		Try: Merritt

Redruth
Referee: Mr T Peak (Penzance)

- Match abandoned when Redruth left the field.

== 1895–96 ==
=== County Championship ===
The County Championship was reorganised with the fifteen teams divided into three groups. The first-placed teams of the South-eastern and South-western Divisions met in a play-off match, with the winners playing the first-placed team of the Northern Division in the final. Yorkshire won the competition for the seventh time defeating Surrey in the final. This was the third system of the County Championship.

Cornwall lost all three matches, and since their first match in 1892 have lost all eleven matches.

South-western group	P	W	D	L	F	A	Pts
Devon	3	3	0	0	43	8	6
Somerset	3	2	0	1	28	6	4
Gloucestershire	3	1	0	2	18	41	2
Cornwall	3	0	0	3	3	37	0

16 November 1895

Devon	22 – 3	Cornwall
		Pen: Salter

Plymouth

30 November 1895

Somerset	5 – 0	Cornwall

Wellington

14 December 1895

Cornwall	0 – 10	Gloucestershire

Falmouth

=== Cornish Rugby League ===
Throughout the season The Cornishman published a league table of the first two matches between six clubs. Only Penzance and Camborne completed all their fixtures and Truro only played five matches. Penzance was in first place and Redruth in second place.

1895–96 Cornish rugby table
Pos	Team	P	W	D	L	Goals for	Tries for	Goals against	Tries against	Pts	Notes
1	Penzance	10	7	1	2	8	15	1	3	15
2	Redruth	8	6	1	1	5	5	1	2	13
3	Camborne	10	4	2	4	4	7	5	5	10
4	Falmouth	6	2	1	3	4	3	3	4	5
5	Penryn	6	1	1	4	2	5	1	6	3
6	Truro	5	0	0	5	0	1	9	12	0
Points are awarded as follows: 2 points for a win; 1 points for a draw; 0 points for a loss

At the end of the season a second table was published, of matches between the top four clubs with Redruth in first place and Penzance in second place. 'Impartial' the rugby reporter declared Redruth ″may fairly again claim the honour of being champions″.

1895–96 Cornish rugby table
Pos	Team	P	W	D	L	Pts	Notes
1	Redruth	6	4	1	1	9
2	Penzance	6	3	1	2	7
3	Falmouth	6	2	0	4	4
4	Camborne	6	1	0	5	2
Points are awarded as follows: 2 points for a win; 1 points for a draw; 0 points for a loss

== 1896–97 ==
=== Cornwall Rugby Championship ===
1896–97 Cornwall Rugby Championship
Pos	Team	P	W	D	L	Goals for	Tries for	Goals against	Tries against	Pts	Notes
1	Penzance	8	6	0	2	6	9	4	3	12
2	School of Mines	8	5	0	3	3	5	2	1	10	(Note: Penryn failed to play the return game with School of Mines who were awarded 2 points)
3	Redruth	8	3	2	3	8	5	4	2	8
4	Falmouth	8	3	2	3	4	7	2	8	8
5	Penryn	8	1	0	7	1	3	10	17	2
Points are awarded as follows: 2 points for a win; 1 points for a draw; 0 points for a loss

== 1897–98 ==
=== Cornish Rugby Championship ===
1897–98 Cornish Senior League
Pos	Team	P	W	D	L	Goals for	Tries for	Goals against	Tries against	Pts	Notes
1	Penzance	10	10	0	0	x	x	3	4	20	(Note: x – unclear in reference)
2	Redruth	10	5	0	5	14	10	5	6	10
3	Falmouth	9	5	0	4	7	12	3	10	10
4	School of Mines	9	3	0	6	7	4	6	6	6
5	Camborne	9	3	0	6	8	7	8	11	6
6	Penryn	8	2	0	6	2	5	16	10	4
Points are awarded as follows: 2 points for a win; 1 points for a draw; 0 points for a loss

=== Junior League ===
1897–98 Cornish Junior League
Pos	Team	Played	Won	Draw	Lost	Goals for	Tries for	Goals against	Tries against	Pts	Notes
1	Redruth A	12	8	1	3	13	24	1	9	23	(Note: Redruth protested against an infringement of the rules by Penzance on 25 September 1897. By the casting vote of the chairman of the CRFU the points were taken from Penzance and awarded to Redruth)
2	Penzance A	12	8	2	2	7	13	5	6	21	(Note: Newlyn played an ineligible man on 27 December 1897 and 1 January 1898. Newlyn lost three points and Penzance gained three points)
3	Newlyn	11	5	4	3	2	13	3	9	15	(Note: Hayle failed to play Newlyn on 30 November 1887 and the points were awarded to Newlyn)
4	Tuckingmill	13	5	5	3	3	9	2	8	15
5	Hayle	12	6	1	5	6	7	8	13	15
6	Camborne A	12	3	0	9	3	6	8	17	8
7	Truro	11	2	1	9	2	8	6	9	5
8	Camborne Mining School A	5	0	0	5	0	2	3	14	0	(Note: The students did not complete their fixtures and their opponents were awarded the points)
Points are awarded as follows: 2 points for a win; 1 points for a draw; 0 points for a loss

== 1898–99 ==
=== Cornish Rugby Championship ===
1898–99 Cornish Senior Rugby Table
Pos	Team	Played	Won	Draw	Lost	Points for	Points against	Pts	Notes
1	Penzance	8	5	1	2	35	15	16	(Note: Penryn refused to play Penzance on 14 January and the points were awarded to Penzance.)
2	Falmouth	7	5	0	2	50	2x	10	(Note: x – unclear in reference)
3	Redruth	6	5	0	1	68	6	11
4	Camborne	8	1	2	5	12	86	4
5	Penryn	6	0	1	5	17	35	1
Points are awarded as follows: 2 points for a win; 1 points for a draw; 0 points for a loss

=== Junior League ===
1898–99 Cornish Junior Rugby Table
Pos	Team	Played	Won	Draw	Lost	Points for	Points against	Pts	Notes
1	Newlyn	9	7	0	2	72	13	20	(Note: Falmouth played ineligible players and the points were awarded to Newlyn)
2	Penzance A	9	7	1	1	56	21	17
3	Falmouth Juniors	8	5	2	1	54	23	11
4	Redruth Juniors	10	4	2	4	58	45	10
5	Tuckingmill	8	1	2	5	12	33	4
6	Camborne A	10	1	1	8	14	93	3
7	Truro	7	0	2	5	6	55	2	(Note: Truro failed to complete their games and the points were awarded to their opponents)
Points are awarded as follows: 2 points for a win; 1 points for a draw; 0 points for a loss

== Bibliography ==
- Salmon, Tom (1983). The First Hundred Years. The Story Of Rugby Football In Cornwall. Illogan: Cornwall RFU. ISBN 0-946664 01-3.
- Pelmear, Kenneth (1960). Rugby In the Duchy (Rugby Heritage) 1884–1959: An Official History of the Game In Cornwall. Falmouth: Cornwall Rugby Football Union.
