= Rugby union at the 1908 Summer Olympics =

Men's rugby union at the Games of the IV Olympiad
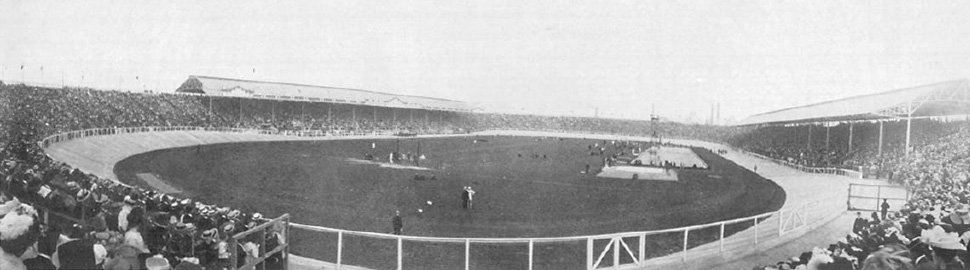
- Venue: White City Stadium
- Date: 26 October
- Competitors: 30 from 2 nations

Medalists
1st place, gold medalist(s)		Australia; Australasia
2nd place, silver medalist(s)		Cornwall; Great Britain

Rugby union football at the 1908 Summer Olympics was summarised under the "football" heading along with association football. The host Great Britain was represented by Cornwall, the 1908 county champion. Defending Olympic champions France withdrew, leaving Australasia, (represented in rugby by the Australia national team exclusively) as the only other remaining entrant.

== History ==
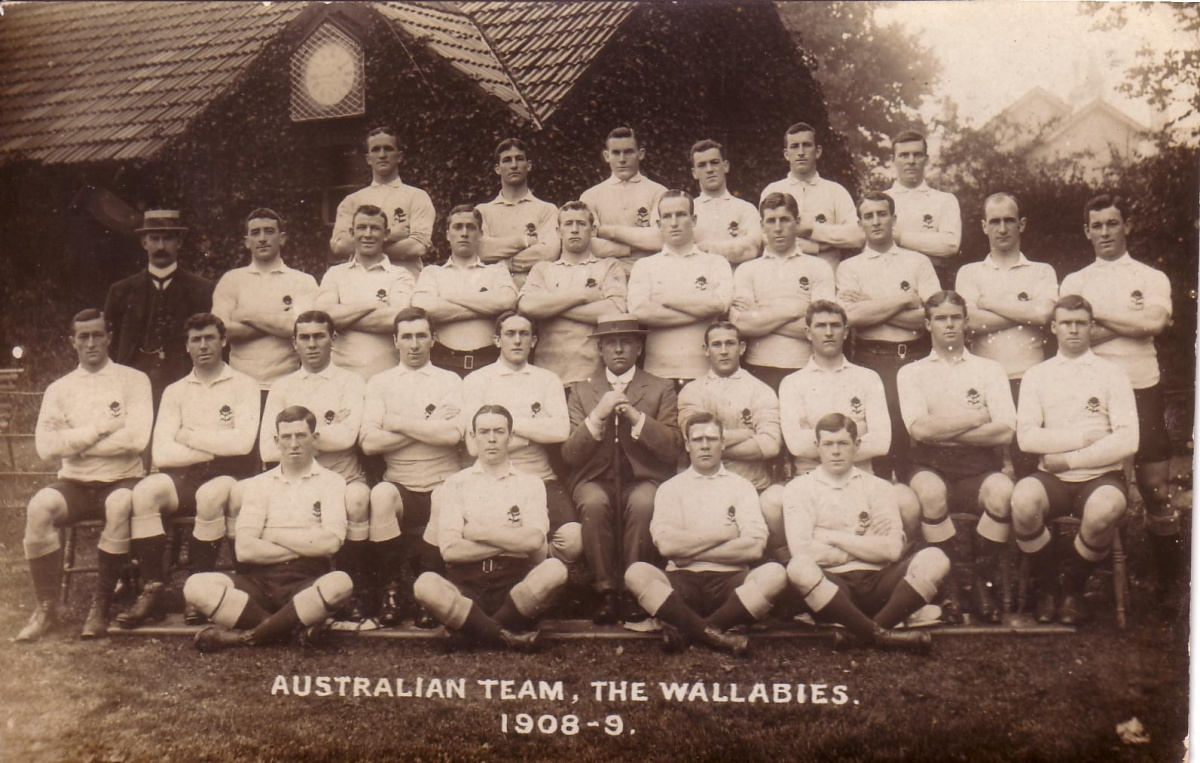
The Australia national team represented Australasia, winning the Gold Medal

The visiting team competed in the London Olympics in conjunction with the inaugural Australia tour of the United Kingdom of 1908-09, in which they would ultimately go 25-5-1 (win, draw, lose) in their 31 matches. The Australian team entered the rugby tournament and were the only other team alongside Cornwall (who were representing Great Britain).

Australia had already beaten Cornwall, the English county champions early in the tour – an 18–5 defeat of Cornwall in their third tour match at Camborne RFC on 3 October 1908. Both Scotland and Ireland had declined the Rugby Football Union's invitations to participate in the Olympic competition, while France withdrew, leaving just the Australian and Great Britain to play for gold and silver medals.

The interest in the Olympic rugby final was only lukewarm, with the final being held in the last week of the Games, that had taken place over six months.

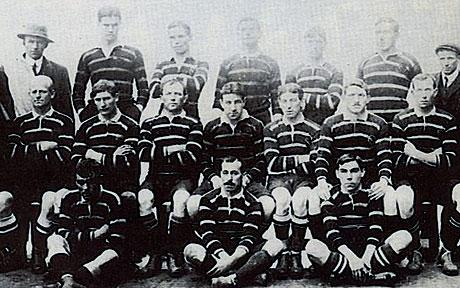
The Cornwall RFU team won the Silver Medal representing Great Britain

In 1908 Twickenham Stadium was still being built: the match was played at the White City Stadium, London, on an area alongside the Olympic Games swimming pool, which measured 110 yards in length with a long line of netting stretched beside to catch flying balls. Large mattresses were spread along the rim of the pool to prevent injuries to falling players. One day was allocated to the Olympic rugby tournament, with the game taking place in a thick mid-week London fog at a virtually deserted White City in wet conditions. Often, a kick for touch saw the ball end up in the pool, and it was said that the Australians were more adept at handling the slippery ball.

Penzance RFC and England international winger Barrie Bennetts had to withdraw with an injury in the morning and was replaced by Barney Solomon – the elder brother of the much more famous Bert. Cornwall had five current or future England players – captain John Jackett of Falmouth at full back, Bert Solomon at centre, England and British Lions fly-half John "Maffer" Davey at fly half who partnered St Ives and England scrum half, Tommy Wedge. The pack which scrummaged on a first up/first down principle in those days included another England man A J Wilson who was a student at Camborne School of Mines.

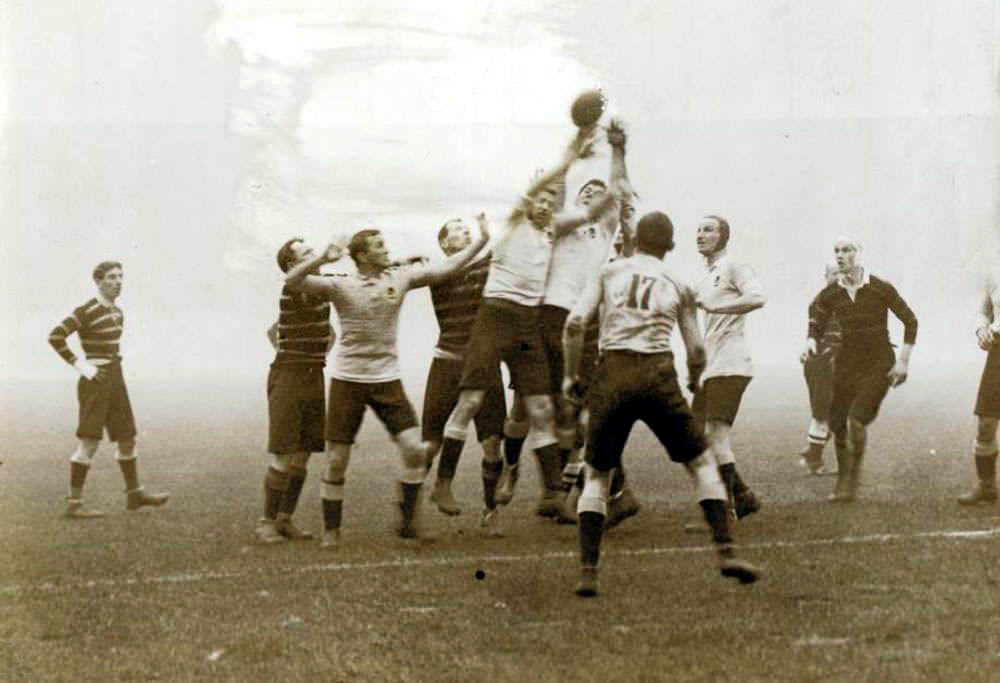
Scene of the final at White City Stadium

Australia outscored Great Britain six tries to one to win the gold medal by 32-3. Silver was awarded to Cornwall and no bronze was awarded. The Cornish silver olympic medal was 'drawn for' by the players and won by Thomas 'Chicky' Wedge and it has been on display at the St Ives RFC clubhouse ever since. After the match, the Cornish players were 'entertained to dinner' by the Cornish Members of Parliament.

Zavos quotes a contemporary newspaper account by Major Trevor in The Daily Telegraph on 27 October 1908, "It will be remembered that less than a month ago there was a match played between Australia and Cornwall at Camborne and although the Australians also won on that occasion, the beaten side then played on the whole, a very good game. Yesterday the champion England county was practically at full strength, but from start to finish they were outplayed. The methods by which this victory was gained were even more creditable to the winners than the completeness of the victory itself and it is only fair to the Australians to speak of their play in terms of unqualified praise. The ground was very slippery and very heavy and as a result of several hours of continuous rain the ball was very greasy. The excellence of the play of the Australian backs therefore surprised the spectators. They gave a display of football which would have done credit to a Welsh international side, at its best. They scored eight tries and so good was the play leading up to each of them that it would be hard to say which was the best."

== Result ==
26 October 1908

Great Britain (United Kingdom)	3–32	Australasia
	Report

White City Stadium, London

Team details

G. Britain	Australasia

- Great Britain: John Jackett, Barney Solomon, Bert Solomon, Frederick Dean, Jimmy Jose, Thomas Wedge, James Davey, Richard Jackett, E. J. Jones, Arthur Wilson, Nicholas Tregurtha, A. Lawrey, Charlie Marshall, A. Wilcocks, John Trevaskis
- Australasia: Phil Carmichael, Charles Russell, Daniel Carroll, Jack Hickey, Frank Smith, Chris McKivat, Arthur McCabe
  Thomas Griffin, John Barnett, Patrick McCue, Sydney Middleton, Tom Richards, Malcolm McArthur, Charles McMurtrie, Robert Craig

== Medal table ==
Rank	Team
1st place, gold medalist(s)	Australasia
2nd place, silver medalist(s)	(United Kingdom) Great Britain

== Team rosters ==
=== Australasia (Australia) ===
Syd Middleton DSO, OBE

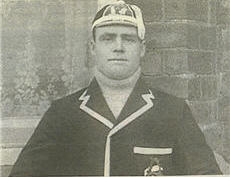
Boxer Russell

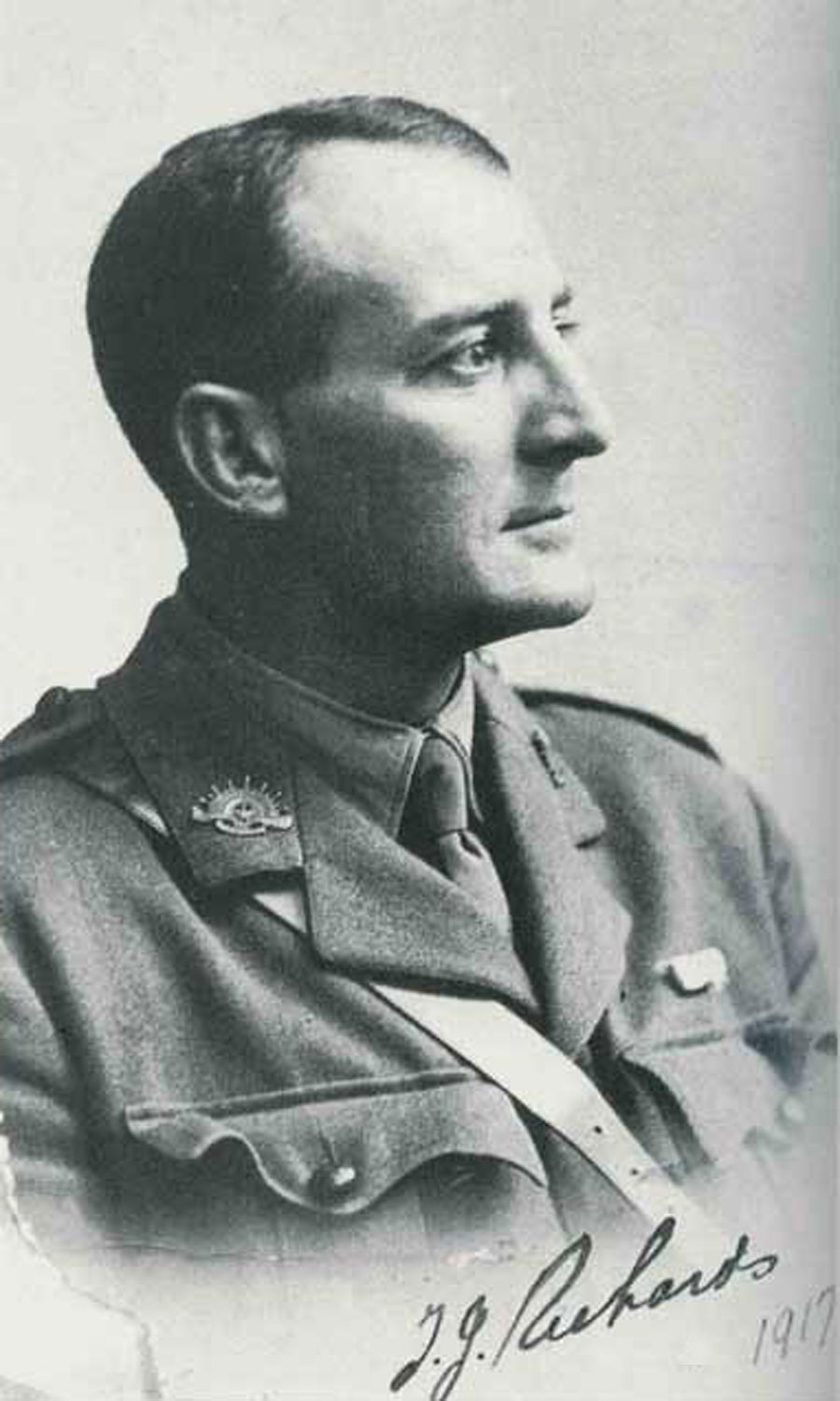
Tom Richards

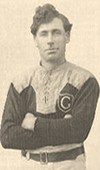
Chris McKivat

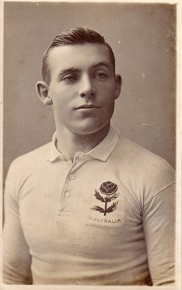
Dan Carroll

Position	Name
Back	Phil Carmichael
¾-backs	Charles Russell
¾-backs	Daniel Carroll
¾-backs	John Hickey
¾-backs	Frank Smith
Halfbacks	Christopher McKivatt
Halfbacks	Arthur McCabe
Forwards	Thomas Griffin
Forwards	Jumbo Barnett
Forwards	Patrick McCue
Forwards	Sydney Middleton
Forwards	Tom Richards
Forwards	Malcolm McArthur
Forwards	Charles McMurtrie
Forwards	Robert Craig

=== Great Britain (Cornwall) ===
Position	Name
Back	John Jackett
Three-quarter-backs	Barney Solomon
Three-quarter-backs	Bert Solomon
Three-quarter-backs	Frederick Dean
Three-quarter-backs	Jimmy Jose
Halfbacks	Thomas Wedge
Halfbacks	Maffer Davey
Forwards	Richard Jackett
Forwards	E. J. Jones
Forwards	Arthur Wilson
Forwards	Nicholas Tregurtha
Forwards	A. Lawrey
Forwards	Charlie Marshall
Forwards	A. Wilcocks
Forwards	John Trevaskis

== Centenary celebration match ==
As part of the centenary celebrations, the British Olympic Association arranged a match between Australia and the Barbarians which was held at Wembley Stadium on 3 December 2008. The Barbarian players, who normally wear their club socks, all wore gold and black socks to represent Cornwall, in a game which Australia won 11-8.

== Bibliography ==
- Cook, Theodore Andrea (1908). The Fourth Olympiad, Being the Official Report. London: British Olympic Association.
- De Wael, Herman (2001). "Rugby 1908". Herman's Full Olympians.
- Zavos, Spiro. Golden Wallabies. Sydney: Penguin.
