= Tony Cook =

Tony Cook may refer to:

- Tony Cook (rugby union), English rugby union player
- Tony Cook (athlete) (born 1936), Australian Olympic marathon runner
- Tony Cook (musician), American dance music producer and former drummer for James Brown
- Tony Cook (footballer, born 1929) (1929–1996), English football goalkeeper
- Tony Cook (footballer, born 1976), English football midfielder
- Tony Cook (politician), member of the Indiana House of Representatives

== See also ==
- Anthony Cook (disambiguation)
