= John Trevaskis =

British rugby union player

Olympic medal record

Men's Rugby union
Silver medal – second place	1908 London	Team competition

John Trevaskis (9 September 1881 – 20 September 1963) was a Cornish rugby union player who competed in the 1908 Summer Olympics at White City Stadium, London. He also played for St Ives RFC and 10 times for Cornwall. He was a member of the British rugby union team, which on 26 October 1908 won the Olympic silver medal for Great Britain.

== See also ==
- Cornish rugby
- Rugby union at the 1908 Summer Olympics
