= Barney Solomon =

British rugby union player

Olympic medal record

Men's Rugby union
Silver medal – second place	1908 London	Team competition

John Charles "Barney" Solomon (11 February 1883 – 27 June 1952) was a British rugby union player who competed as captain for Great Britain in the 1908 Summer Olympics at White City Stadium, London. He also played for Redruth R.F.C. He was captain of the British rugby union team, which on 26 October 1908 won the Olympic silver medal for Great Britain.

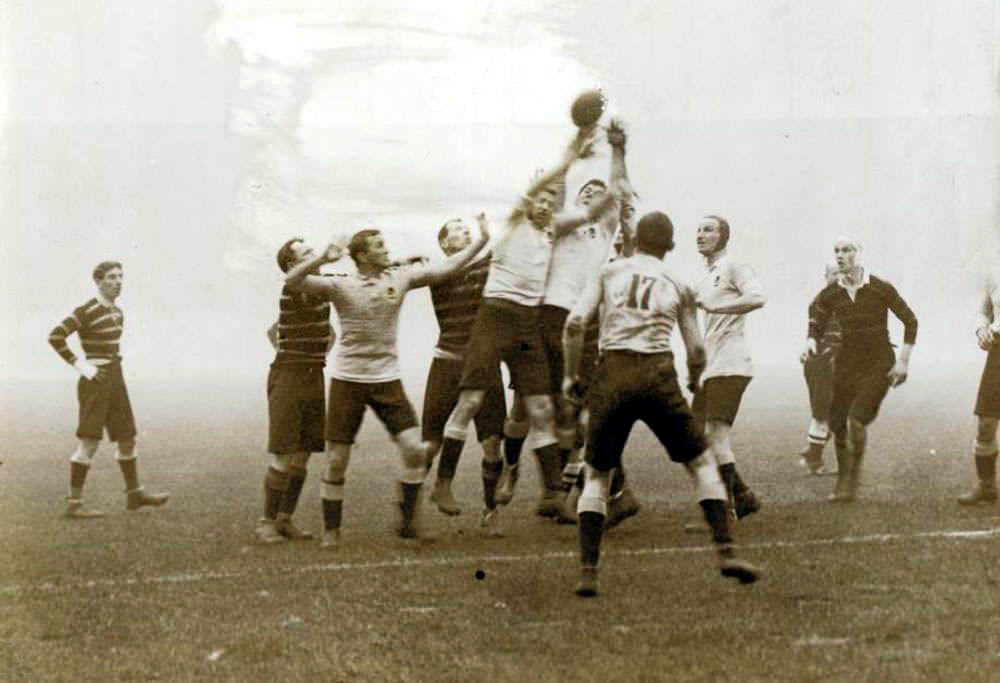
1908 Olympic Gold Final Wallabies v Cornwall.

== See also ==
- Cornish rugby
