= Anthony Cook =

Anthony Cook or Cooke may refer to:

- Anthony Cook (serial killer) (born 1949), American serial killer
- Anthony Cook (defensive end) (born 1972), former American football defensive end
- Anthony Cook (basketball) (born 1967), retired American basketball player
- Anthony Cook (footballer) (born 1989), English footballer, currently playing for Ebbsfleet United
- Anthony Cook (defensive back) (born 2000), American football defensive back
- Anthony Cooke (1504–1576), tutor to the young Edward VI of England
- Anthony Cooke (Royal Navy officer) (1927–2019), British admiral
- Anthony John Cooke (1931–2012), organist and composer

== See also ==
- Anthony Coke, 6th Earl of Leicester (1909–1994), pronounced Anthony Cook
- Tony Cook (disambiguation)
