= Stack Stevens =

British Lions & England international rugby union player

- Born: Claude Brian Stevens; 2 June 1940 Godolphin
- Died: 10 October 2017 (aged 76)
- Occupation: Farmer

Rugby union career
- Position: Prop
Amateur team(s)
Years	Team	Apps	(Points)
- Penzance-Newlyn RFC
–	Harlequins		
–	Cornwall		
International career
Years	Team	Apps	(Points)
1969–75	England	25	
1971	British Lions		

Claude Brian "Stack" Stevens (2 June 1940 – 10 October 2017) was an English rugby union player who played prop for Penzance and Newlyn, Harlequins, Cornwall (with 83 caps, and captain from 1973 to 1975) and England 25 times at international level between 1969 and 1975, captaining them for a match in 1971. He also toured with the British and Irish Lions to Australia and New Zealand in 1971.

Stevens had suffered from a rare and serious neurological condition. He died on 10 October 2017.
