= Newlyn RFC =

Former English rugby union club, based in Newlyn, Cornwall

(England) Newlyn RFC
- Founded: 1894; 132 years ago
- Disbanded: 21 Nov 1944; 81 years ago
- Location: Newlyn, Cornwall, UK
- Ground: St Goulders

Newlyn RFC was a rugby football club formed in 1894 (or 1895) and based in Newlyn, Cornwall, UK. They played their final match in December 1939 and amalgamated with Penzance RFC in 1944 to form Penzance & Newlyn RFC (The Pirates), currently known as the Cornish Pirates.

== History ==
The club was formed in 1894 (or 1895) by a young curate of St Peter’s Church, the Rev Fred Peel Yates. Before the founding of the club it was said that the young men of the village played a form of rugby on St Goulders Common and on moonlit nights a ball covered in chalk was used to make it easier to see. In 1897–98 Newlyn RFC won the Cornwall Junior Cup, however the cup had to be returned to the Cornwall RFU because of an un-registered player. The following year the cup was won again. Newlyn, like many Cornish towns and villages, was hit by the migration of its young men and shortly after, the club disbanded only to restart in 1904 as a senior club.

There was always a certain amount of animosity with near neighbours Penzance RFC, although. because of the income lost when the matches were suspended, it was never in either clubs interest not to play matches. The gate receipts for a Boxing Day match, in the 1890s, against Penzance Reserves came to over £40. With an entrance fee of 4d, a crowd of well over two thousand attended. A 1906-minute records ...that we accept no player or committee man from Penzance. Despite this players did play for both clubs.

As was usual for many clubs, Newlyn RFC did not operate during the Great War but occasional games were played near the Penlee Quarry by personnel of the Seaplane Base.

Newlyn RFC final match was in December, 1939 when they beat St Ives.

In November 1944, after a public meeting held in St Peter’s Schoolroom, it was agreed to hold talks with Penzance RFC with a view to amalgamation. A Penzance RFU committee meeting on 21 November agreed to wind up the rugby club; and at a public meeting at the Guildhall, Penzance on 12 December 1944, it was agreed to start a new club. Despite the animosity the two clubs combined to form Penzance & Newlyn RFC.

== Honours ==
- Cornwall Junior Cup winners (2): 1897–98 (returned due to un-registered player), 1898–99
- Cornwall Junior Champions 1911–12

== Playing record ==
Season	Pos	P	W	D	L	F	A	Pts	Notes
1909–10		18	12	1	5
1910–11
1911–12	1st	28	22	3	3	222	45	45	Champions
1912–13	1st

== Grounds ==
The club played their matches at St Goulders, to the north of Newlyn overlooking the Coombe. The pitch was known for its slope and was grazed by cows during the week. In an attempt to stop people watching for free furze was put in the holes in the hedges to try to stop people sneaking in. Some matches were played at Trereife.

== Cornwall players ==
	First Year	Last Year	Name	Number of Caps	Notes
1	1901	1901	O Gilbert	1	
2	1920	1928	N ‘Nicky’ Peake	22	Forward
3	1922	1924	R A ‘Dick' Curnow	9	
4	1924	1924	Edwal L Rees	5	Three quarter; knee injury shortened career
5	1927	1927	Jack Matthews	2	Forward
6	1931	1935	Gerald Kneebone	4	
7	1936	1936	R ‘Dick’ Kitchen	1	Stand-off
8	1936	1936	Jack Stafford	1	

== Other Newlyn teams ==
- Newlyn Old Boys XV (acted as a nursery for Newlyn RFC)
- St Peters
- The Adult School

== See also ==
- Cornish Pirates
- Penzance RFC
