= Penzance RFC =

Former English rugby union club, based in Penzance, Cornwall

(Cornwall) Penzance RFC
- Full name: Penzance Rugby Football Club
- Founded: 1876; 150 years ago
- Location: Penzance, Cornwall, England
- Ground(s): St Clare; Alverton

Official website
- www.cornish-pirates.com

Penzance RFC formed in 1876, was a rugby union club based in Penzance, Cornwall, England. They amalgamated with Newlyn RFC in 1944 to form Penzance and Newlyn RFC (The Pirates), currently known as the Cornish Pirates.

== History ==
=== 1870–1914 ===
The first recorded rugby match in Penzance is from 1870, played in the grounds of Poltair House, Heamoor and organised by W Borlase of Marlborough School. The Penzance team was mostly public schoolboys, home on holiday, and the opponents the Eastern Telegraph Company based in Porthcurno. The club, formed in 1876, played for a few seasons, did not flourish and was restarted in 1883, by J B Cornish who acted as secretary, treasurer and captain. The club initially played in claret and blue but soon changed to black and white in varying styles. Fixtures in their first season (1877–78) included Redruth (possibly the first opponents), Hayle and Lelant and the club won all their matches with only one try was scored against them. At the 1878 AGM it was stated that it would be desirable if all the players should wear the same colour jerseys!

Arthur Trounson (full back) was the first player to win a Cornwall cap when picked to play in the first (recorded) match against Devon, at Plymouth on 12 January 1894, which was lost by two goals and three tries. Club captain Cornish was to win the first of his six caps, a year later, in 1885 and captained Cornwall on two occasions in 1886–87 and 1889–90. Success finally came to the club, fourteen years after they were founded, when the Cornwall Rugby Cup was won in two consecutive seasons (1896–97 and 1897–98); the second one unbeaten against Cornish clubs. By now the Cornwall selectors were increasingly picking Penzance players for Cornwall; on one occasion five players playing in the same match. By the Great War, thirty-eight different Penzance RFC players had represented Cornwall winning over two hundred caps between them.

=== 1920–1945 ===
Fixtures between Penzance and Newlyn were hotly contested and sometimes suspended. Between 1929 and 1932 matches between the clubs were cancelled, a big loss of income to both clubs and one they could not afford. In 1930 the club had a deficit of £58 for the season, in 1933 a balance of 1/3d and by 1936 there was a vote on whether Penzance RFC should continue. The club did continue and so did the poor finances and at the 1939 AGM the club had only 17 shillings. Suggestions of an amalgamation with Newlyn were considered premature by that club and the start of the Second World War put an end to club rugby for a few years. In November 1944, after a public meeting, Newlyn RFC agreed to hold talks with Penzance RFC with a view to amalgamation. A subsequent Penzance RFU committee meeting on 21 November agreed to wind up the rugby club; and at a public meeting at the Guildhall on 12 December 1944 it was agreed to start a new club. Penzance-Nelwyn RFC was born.

== Honours ==
- Cornwall Senior Rugby Table winners (4): 1896–97, 1897–98, 1898–99, 1903–04

== Playing record ==
Season	P	W	D	L	F	A	Ref
1879–80	6	2	1	3			
1880–81	4	2	0	2			
1881–82	6	4	0	2			
1882–83							
1883–84							
1884–85	12	10	1	1			
1885–86							
1886–87							
1887–88	12	3	2	7	21	21	Four of the matches were played under association rules!
1889–90	8	2	4	4			Seven matches were played under association rules with 5 won and 2 lost.
1892–93	17	10	1	6	105	53	
1893–94	16	9	2	5	121	60	
1894–95	20	9	2	9	113	81	
1895–96	25	13	3	9	154	95	
1896–97	22	15	2	5			
1897–98	23	14	3	6	161	96	
1898–99	24	10	6	8	91	145	
1899–1900	32	14	6	12	172	141	
1902–03	20	9	2	9			
1903–04	10	7	0	3			League matches
1903–04	25	11	1	13	142	189	All matches
1904–05	26	5	4	17			
1906–07	18	2	2	14			

== Grounds ==
A number of playing fields were used around Penzance including the a field at Trereife (from November 1886), Alexandra Grounds, Coombe Lane (Heamoor), St Just Road (Alverton) - until April 1905, and St Clare from the start of the 1905–06 season. Finally in January 1934 a sub-committee was formed to negotiate with the Borough Council the use of the Mennaye Fields as a rugby ground.

== Internationals ==
=== Barrie Bennetts ===
It is considered a great honour to be invited to play for the Barbarians and in 1908 Barrie Bennetts was invited to join the annual tour to South Wales playing against Penarth and Cardiff. A year later he was capped twice by England and in 1909 selected to join John Raphael's, 1910 Combined British team's tour of Argentina, playing in Argentina's first international test. An injury robbed him of the chance to play in the 1908 Olympics when Cornwall, as County Champions, represented Great Britain in the games.

=== Combined British Team to Argentina ===
- Barrie B Bennetts

	Date	Opponents	Venue	Result	Score	Notes
1	1910 June 12	Argentina	Flores	W	28 – 3	Argentina's first International match

=== England ===
- Barrie B Bennetts

	Date	Opponents	Venue	Result	Score	Notes
1	1909 Jan 9	Australia	Rectory Field, Blackheath	L	3 – 9	First England v Australia International
2	1909 Jan 16	Wales	Cardiff Arms Park	L	0 – 8	Home International Championship, with four Cornish players in the England team

== Cornwall ==
Fifty-two players from Penzance RFC were picked to represent Cornwall with six of them going on to be captain.

	First year	Last year	Name	Caps	Notes
1	1883	1884	Arthur H Trounson	2	Fullback
2	1885	1889	J B Cornish	6	
3	1885	1893	George Kistler	15	known as "The Giant"
4	1885	1893	Tom J Peake	10	one of three brothers to play for Cornwall
5	1888	–	K Stewart	1	
6	1888	1895	A H Thorne	11	
7	1888	–	H Trenerry	1	
8	1889	1890	Rose	2	
9	1889	1897	W Dennis Lawry	9	brother of R C Lawry
10	1889	–	A Robinson	1	
11	1890	–	Craze	1	
12	1891	–	Saunders	1	
13	1891	–	Yates	1	
14	1891	1895	H Olivey	4	
15	1892	1893	G Stephens	3	
16	1892	–	F Peak	2	one of three brothers to play for Cornwall
17	1893	1895	W G Peak	4	one of three brothers to play for Cornwall
18	1893	–	Down	2	
19	1894	1900	Oliver Triggs	19	
20	1894	–	J W Nunn	1	
21	1894	–	H Lovell	2	
22	1895	1897	E Jasper	8	
23	1895	1897	B Beckerleg	2	
24	1895	–	J Sampson	1	
25	1895	–	J H Gartell	2	
26	1896	1902	Dr R C Lawry	19	brother of W D Lawry
27	1896	-	J T Triggs	1	
28	1896	–	W R Trembath	3	
29	1896	–	B Collings	2	
30	1897	1903	T Martin	12	
31	1897	–	C Graves	2	
32	1897	1898	G E Gallaher	4	
33	1902	1912	Barrie B Bennetts	42	Also represented Cornwall at cricket, golf and hockey
34	1902	–	T King	3	
35	1902	1907	D Brown	12	
36	1903	1907	F Carter	8	
37	1909	1919	T Floyd	2	
38	1909	1910	W J Vicary	4	
39	1922	1923	H Beckerleg	3	Three-quarters
40	1924	1928	H E F Maddrell	9	Forward
41	1927	1932	W 'Bill' Rowe	13	
42	1929	1932	C H G Penny	9	Forward
43	1931	–	Roger Simpson	1	
44	1932	1933	Ronnie W Sturgess	3	
45	1932	1933	I Uren	8	
46	1932	1936	H E Thomas	8	
47	1932	1935	R Matthews	9	
48	1935	–	B Edmonds	1	
49	1935	1936	J S Griffiths	4	
50	1936	–	B Moffitt	2	
51	1937	–	F Blewett	1	
52	1938	1945	P C Gartrell	3	

Key: Name in gold indicates the player captained Cornwall on at least one occasion

== Other Penzance teams ==
- Abbey School Football Club – played in 1879
- Causewayhead United – played in the Town rugby cup
- St John's Bible Class – played in 1898
- Black Watch (1 drop goal, 2 tries, 10 pts) beat Scarlet Runners (2 tries, 6pts) in the replayed tie of the 1902 Penzance Junior Town Cup.

== See also ==
- Newlyn RFC
- Cornish Pirates
