= Frank Smith (rugby union) =

- Born: Francis Bede Smith; 28 February 1886 Wellington, New South Wales
- Died: 29 October 1954 (aged 68) Wellington, New South Wales

Rugby union career
- Position: Centre
International career
Years	Team	Apps	(Points)
1905–07	Australia	4	(0)
Medal record
Men's rugby union
Representing Australasia
Olympic Games
Gold medal – first place	1908 London	Team competition

Francis Bede Smith (28 February 1886 – 29 October 1954) was an Australian rugby union player who competed in the 1908 Summer Olympics. Smith, a centre, was born in Wellington, New South Wales and claimed a total of 4 international rugby caps for Australia. His debut game was against New Zealand at Dunedin on 2 September 1905.

He was a member of the Australian rugby union team, which won the gold medal.

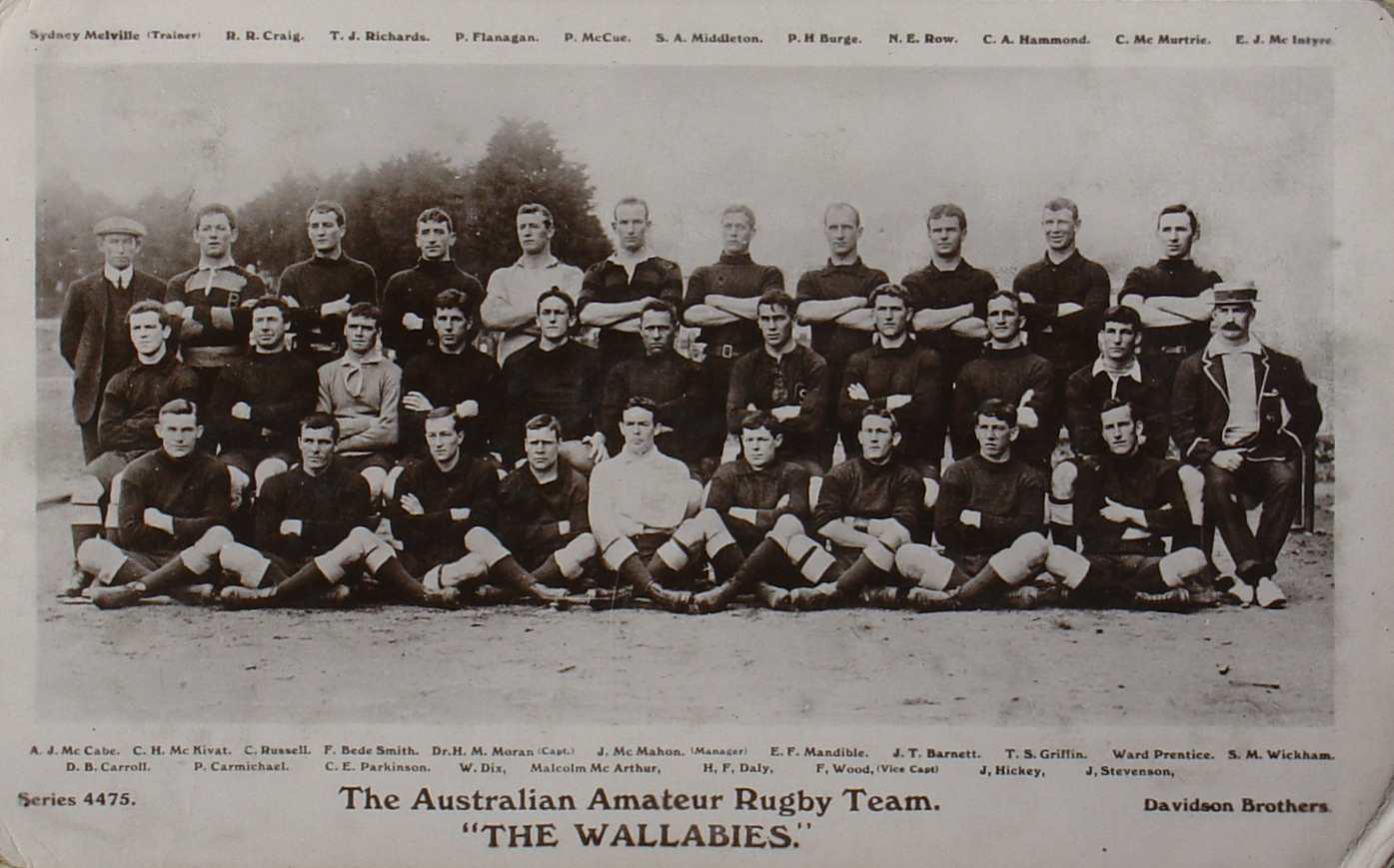
"F. Bede Smith" in middle row, 4th from left, with the 1908 Wallaby tour squad

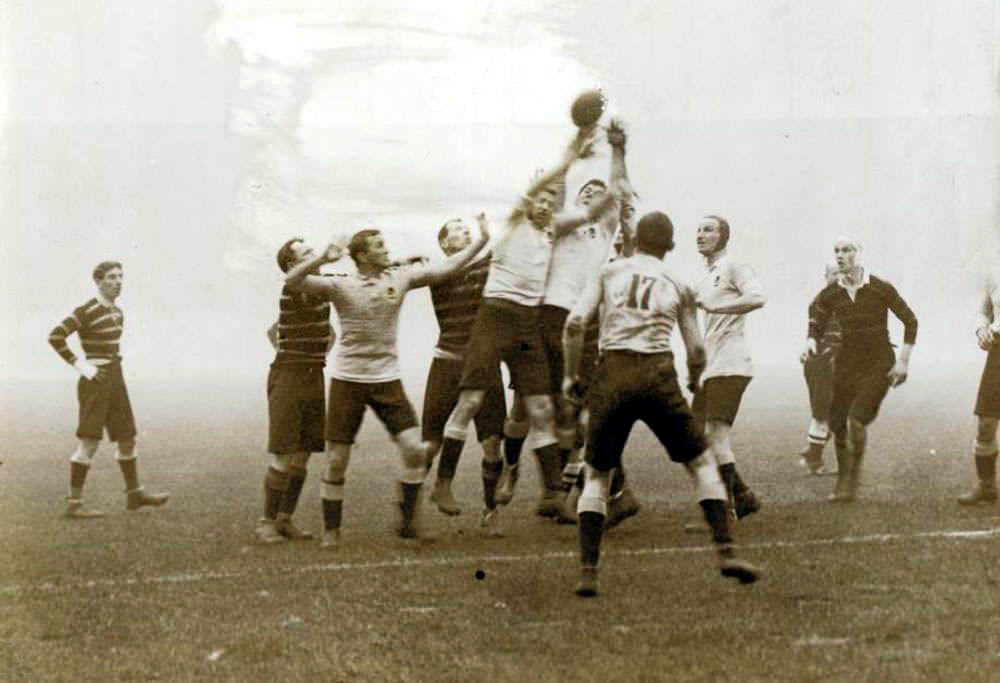
1908 Olympic Gold Final Wallabies v Cornwall.

== See also ==
- Rugby union at the 1908 Summer Olympics
