= Charlie Marshall (rugby union) =

British rugby union player

Olympic medal record

Men's Rugby union
Silver medal – second place	1908 London	Team competition

Charles Richard Marshall (2 March 1886 – 23 August 1947) was a British rugby union player who competed in the 1908 Summer Olympics. He was a member of the British rugby union team, which won the silver medal.
