= Tom Griffin (rugby) =

Australian rugby union player

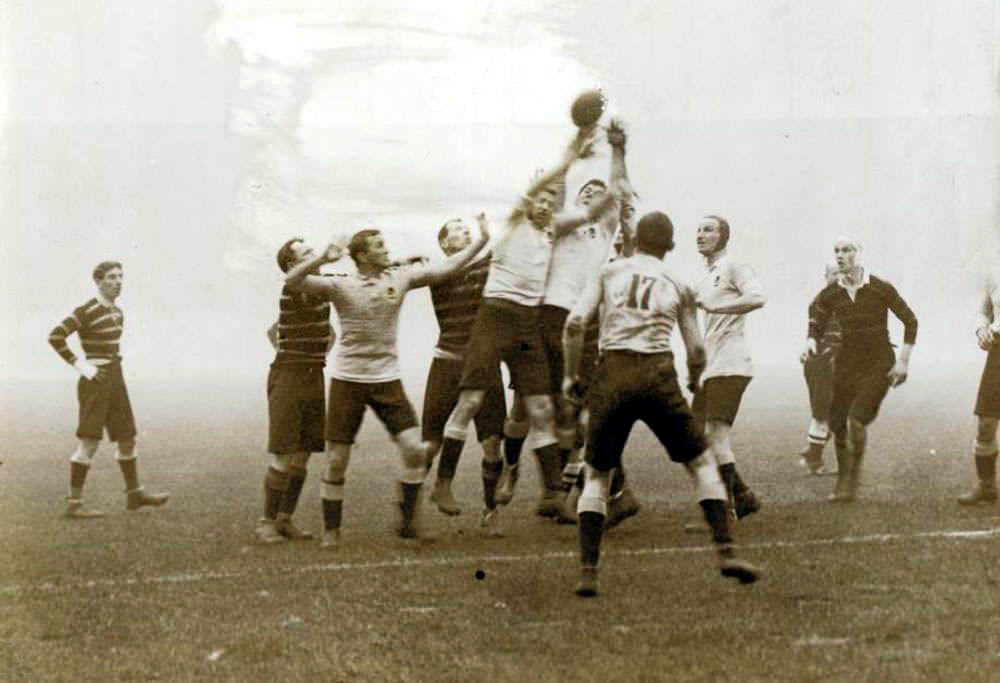
- Born: Thomas Sydney Griffin; 19 February 1884 Sydney, New South Wales
- Died: 19 December 1950 (aged 66)

Rugby union career
- Position: Hooker
International career
| Years | Team | Apps | (Points) |
| 1907–12 | Wallabies | 6 | (0) |
Medal record
Men's rugby union
Representing Australasia
Olympic Games
| Gold medal – first place | 1908 London | Team competition |

Thomas Sydney Griffin (19 February 1884 – 19 December 1950) was an Australian rugby union player who competed in the 1908 Summer Olympics.

Griffin, a hooker, was born in Sydney, New South Wales and claimed a total of six international rugby caps for Australia.

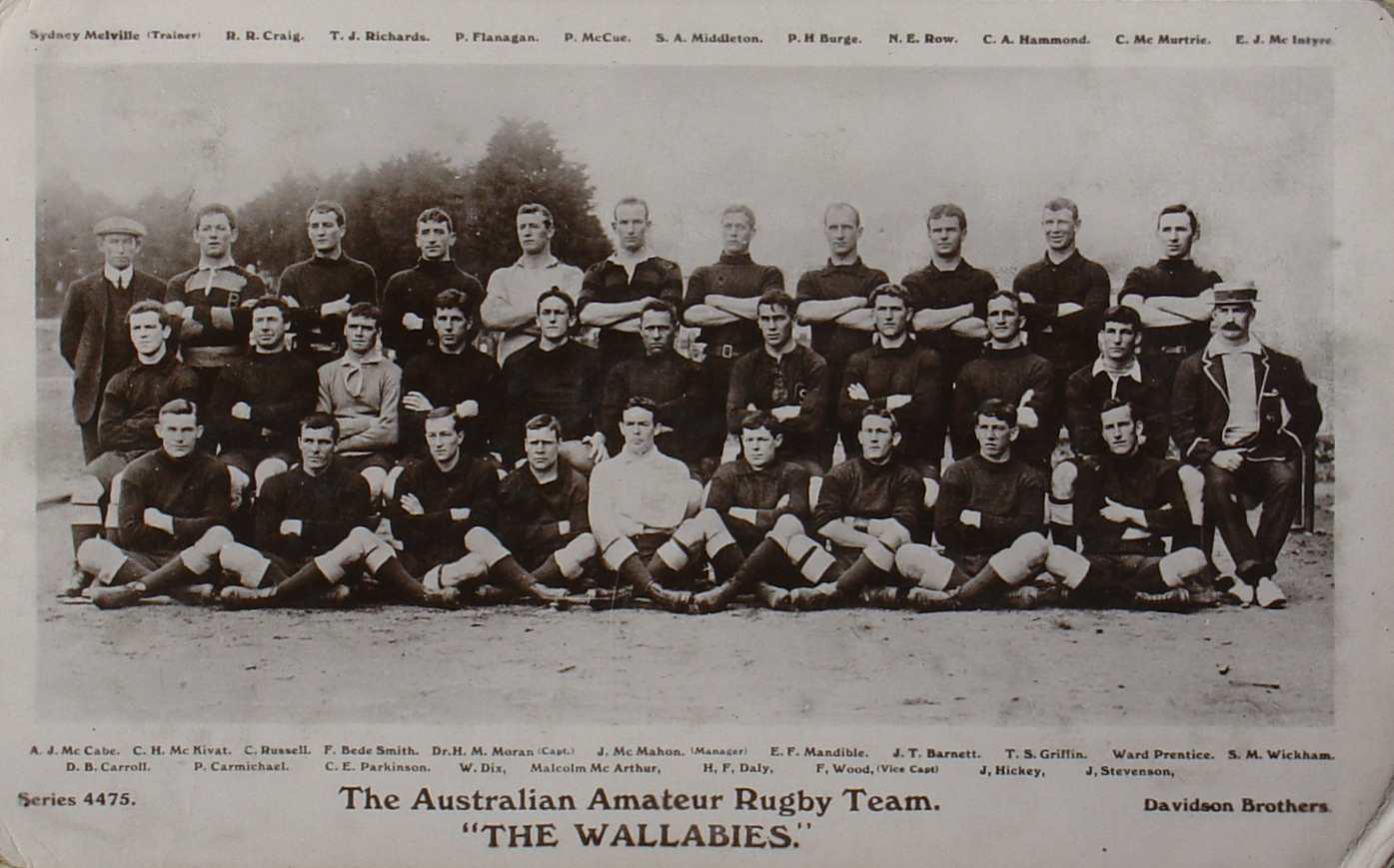
Griffen middle row 3rd from right, with the 1908 Wallaby tour squad

== See also ==
- Rugby union at the 1908 Summer Olympics
- 1912 Australia rugby union tour of Canada and the United States
