= Jimmy Jose =

Shipwright and rugby player

Olympic medal record

Men's Rugby union
Silver medal – second place	1908 London	Team competition

James Trick Jose (1881 – 1963) was a Cornish rugby union player born in Falmouth who played for both Falmouth RFC and Devonport Albion (now Plymouth Albion). Jose gained 20 caps for Cornwall between 1904–11 and was a member of the famous 1908 County Championship winning side who beat Durham 17–3 at Redruth.

Also, on 26 October 1908, playing for Cornwall, who were representing Great Britain, he competed in the 1908 Summer Olympics at White City Stadium, London, losing to Australia in the final.

== See also ==
- Cornish rugby
