= Nicholas Tregurtha =

British rugby union player

Olympic medal record

Men's Rugby union
Silver medal – second place	1908 London	Team competition

Nicholas Jacob Tregurtha (14 Dec 1884 – 14 May 1964) was a British rugby union player who competed in the 1908 Summer Olympics. He was born in St. Ives, Cornwall, United Kingdom. He died in 1964 in Bodmin, Cornwall. He was a member of the British rugby union team, which won the silver medal.

== Career ==
A fisherman by trade, Tregurtha played his club rugby for St Ives RFC. In 1905, he received his first call up to play in the County Championship for Cornwall by the Cornwall Rugby Football Union. He was a part of Cornwall's victorious 1907–08 Rugby Union County Championship winning team. He played in the final against Durham Rugby Football Union and scored a try to win the County Championship for Cornwall for the first time.

Due to Cornwall winning the County Championship, they were selected to represent Great Britain and Ireland at the 1908 Summer Olympics due to the Home Nations not entering a team. Tregurtha was selected as a part of the Great Britain team. He played for Cornwall in a warm up match against the Australia national rugby union team three weeks before the Olympics. The rugby at the 1908 Summer Olympics meant Great Britain played Australasia in the final at White City Stadium, London with Tregurtha playing. Great Britain lost in the final but won the silver medal.

Tregurtha continued to play rugby for Cornwall, playing for them in 52 consecutive games until suffering an injury against the touring South Africa national rugby union team in 1912. He later emigrated to Canada.
