= Martin Haag =

English rugby union player

- Born: Martin Haag; 28 July 1968 (age 58) Chelmsford, Essex, England
- Height: 6 ft 6 in (1.98 m)
- Weight: 21 st (133 kg)
- School: Penwith Sixth Form College

Rugby union career
- Position: Lock
Amateur team(s)
Years	Team	Apps	(Points)
-1987	St Ives		
Senior career
Years	Team	Apps	(Points)
1987–2001	Bath Rugby	307	(30)
2001–2003	Penzance–Newlyn		
2003–2004	Bristol Shoguns		
- Correct as of 15 July 2012
International career
Years	Team	Apps	(Points)
1997	England	2	(0)
- Correct as of 15 July 2012
Coaching career
- Years: Team
- 2009–2012: Bath Rugby
- 2012–2015: Nottingham
- 2016: England U-20s

Martin Haag (born 28 July 1968) is an English rugby union coach and former player who principally played for Bath and won two international caps for England. In March 2016 he was appointed head coach of England's under-20 team.

== Early life ==
Haag was born in Chelmsford, England. His family moved to Cornwall when he was four years old, and Haag was educated at St Ives School and Penwith Sixth Form College and represented England Schools and Cornwall before joining Bath in 1987.

== Playing career ==
=== Bath ===
He established a first team place during the 1990–91 Courage League season, winning the Bath 'Player of the Year' award at the end of the season. Throughout his career, he achieved a reputation as a sevens player, playing in Bath's victorious evens squad which won the Save & Prosper and the Welsh Snelling Sevens, as well as in Malaysia and elsewhere.

Haag won an England B cap against Spain and Ireland B in 1992, and was then selected for the New Zealand tour, winning his third B cap in the second international match. A fast player about the field, he was selected for the England 'A's' in 1995/96 and in 1997 for England's tour of Argentina. He won his first full cap in the 46–20 victory over Argentina on 31 May 1997 and his second and last cap in the 13–33 defeat the following week.

Haag started for Bath in the 1998 Heineken Cup Final as they defeated Brive. He made his 300th appearance for Bath in the 35–19 Heineken Cup victory over Castres Olympique on 13 January 2001, celebrating the occasion with a try, his 27th for the club. In April 2001, with Haag having lost his place to Mark Gabey and Bath also having the resources of Andy Lloyd, Steve Borthwick and new signing Danny Grewcock to call on, the club announced that his services would not be needed for the 2001–2002 season. In total he played 295 times for Bath Rugby with 9 appearances as a substitute before becoming Youth Academy Coach with the club.

== Coaching career ==
In July 2003 he joined Bristol Shoguns as first team coach. In 2005 he agreed a three-year extension to his contract.

After leaving Bristol in 2007 he was assistant coach to the England Under 18 side that toured Australia before returning to Bath in September 2007 and taking up the post of Academy Forwards Coach. In June 2008 Haag left Bath Rugby to join the Rugby Football Union (RFU) and take up a position as a National Academy Coach. The role saw him involved with the coaching of the England U20 team. In June 2009 he returned to Bath Rugby when he succeeded Mark Bakewell as forwards coach to the senior team. Haag left Bath when his contract expired at the end of the 2011–2012 season.

In July 2012 he became head coach at RFU Championship side Nottingham. The team finished second in the 2012–13 RFU Championship in his first season at the club. He held this position until his appointment as the head coach of the RFU's Under 20s team in 2016.

Haag was the head coach of the England team that won the 2016 World Rugby Under 20 Championship hosted in England. The team defeated Ireland in the final.
