= Tony Cook (rugby union) =

English rugby union player

Tony Cook is a former Cornish rugby union player who played for Hayle RFC, Devon and Cornwall Police RFC, Camborne RFC, Redruth R.F.C. and is the highest capped player to represent Cornwall with a record 102 appearances. He retired as head coach at Hayle RFC in March 2005 after spending eight years at the club.

== See also ==
- Cornish rugby
