= Thomas Wedge (rugby union) =

English rugby union player

Tommy Chicky Wedge
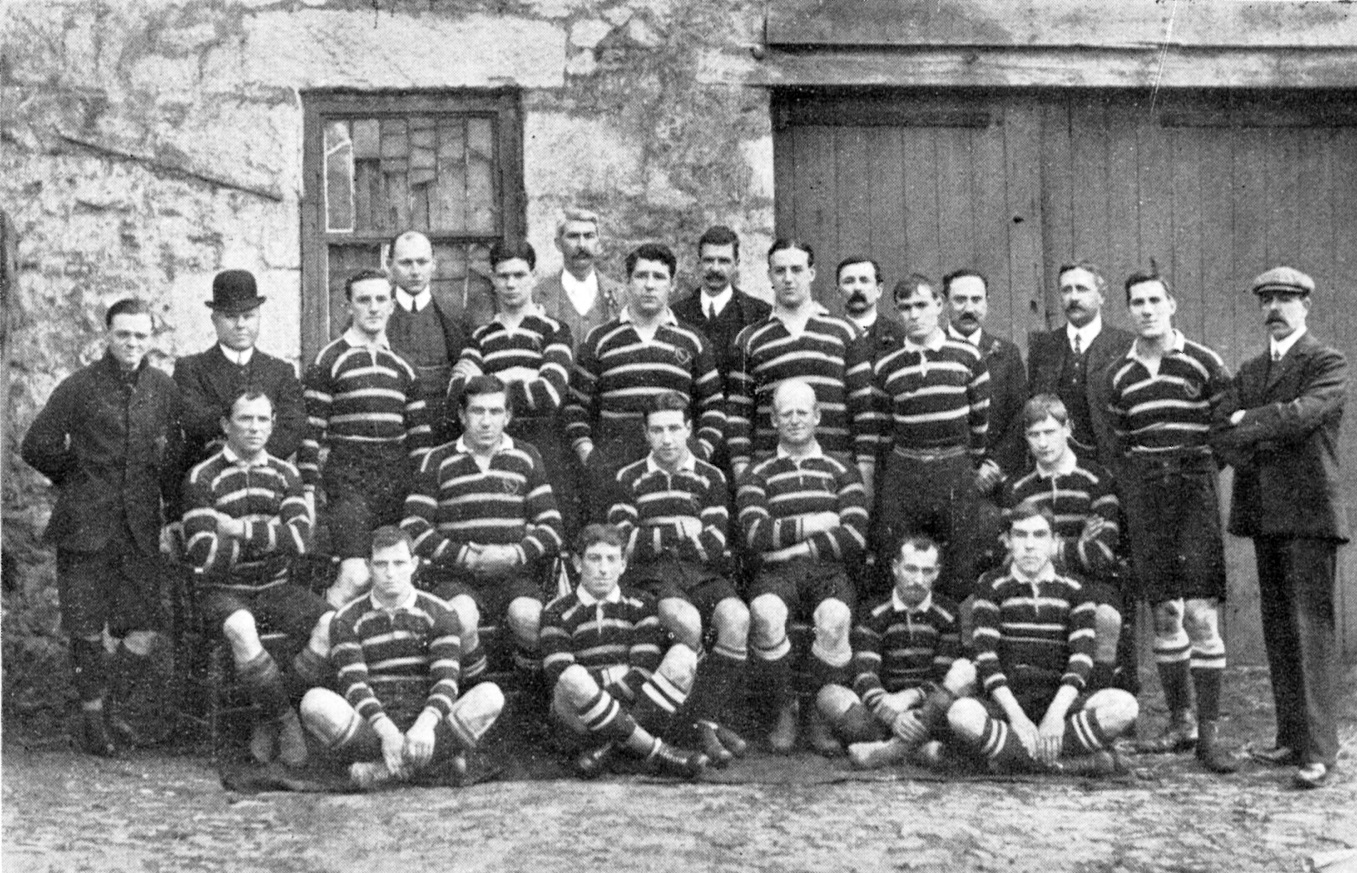
- Chicky, front row second from right
- Born: Thomas Grenfell Wedge; 15 August 1881 St Ives, Cornwall
- Died: 11 December 1964 (aged 83) Penzance
- Occupation(s): Fisherman; Coastguard

Rugby union career
- Position: Scrum-half
Amateur team(s)
Years	Team	Apps	(Points)
- St Ives RFC
1903–11	Cornwall	29	
International career
Years	Team	Apps	(Points)
1907–09	England	2	

Olympic medal record

Men's Rugby union
Silver medal – second place	1908 London	Team competition

Thomas "Chicky" Grenfell Wedge (15 August 1881 – 13 December 1964) was an English rugby union player born in St Ives, Cornwall.

Wedge a scrum-half played his club rugby for St Ives RFC as well as representing Cornwall, he gained 29 caps between 1903–11 and was a member of the famous 1908 County Championship winning side that beat Durham 17–3 in the final at Redruth in front of 17,000 people. He gained two international caps for England against France in 1907 and again against Wales in 1909.

"Chicky" also competed in the 1908 Summer Olympics. On 26 October, he was a member of the British rugby union team (represented by Cornwall), which won the silver medal, losing against Australia in the final; the game was played at White City Stadium as Twickenham was still being built at the time.

As only one medal was awarded to the side, the team drew straws for who should take it home, which Wedge won.
