= Frederick Dean (rugby union) =

British rugby player

Olympic medal record

Men's Rugby union
Silver medal – second place	1908 London	Team competition

Frederick Dean (1 September 1880 – 1 September 1946) was a Cornish rugby union player who played for Devonport Albion now Plymouth Albion R.F.C. Fred was capped 29 times for Cornwall and was a member of the famous 1908 team that beat Durham in the County Championship final 17-3 at Redruth.

He was also a member of the Cornwall XV that represented the Great Britain rugby union in the 1908 Summer Olympics, which on 26 October 1908 won the Olympic silver medal at White City Stadium, losing to Australia in the final. He was born in Plymouth and died in Devonport, Devon.

== See also ==
- Cornish rugby
