= Harry Coverdale =

England international rugby union player

- Born: 22 March 1889 Hartlepool, England
- Died: 29 October 1965 (aged 76) South Africa
- School: Rossall School

Rugby union career
- Position: Half-back
International career
Years	Team	Apps	(Points)
1910–20	England	4	(4)

Harry Coverdale (22 March 1889 – 29 October 1965) was an English international rugby union player.

Born in Hartlepool, Coverdale concentrated on sports other than rugby during his schoolboy years, gaining colours for association football, cricket and hockey while at Rossall School in Lancashire.

Coverdale, a diminutive outside-half, played his early rugby with Hartlepool Rovers and was member of the Durham side which won the County Championship in 1909, before moving down to London. He joined Blackheath in the 1909–10 season, at the end of which he won the first of his four England caps, playing a Five Nations match in Paris. Two further caps came in 1912 and he contributed a drop-goal in an away win over France. After his wartime service, Coverdale returned for one final international match in the 1920 Five Nations.

== See also ==
- List of England national rugby union players
