= John Jackett (rugby union) =

British Lions & England international rugby union & league player

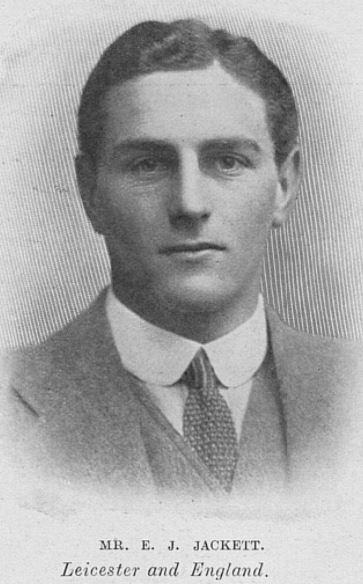
- Jackett photographed in 1910
- Born: Edward John Jackett; 4 July 1878 Falmouth, Cornwall
- Died: 11 November 1935 (aged 57) Middlesbrough, England
- Notable relative: Richard ″Dick″ Jackett (brother)
- Occupation(s): Artist's model Policeman; Theatre manager

Rugby union career
- Position: Fullback
Senior career
Years	Team	Apps	(Points)
- Falmouth RFC
1898-1911	Cornwall	52	(108)
1904-11	Leicester Tigers	183	
International career
Years	Team	Apps	(Points)
1905-09	England	13	(4)
1908	Lions	3	(0)
- Rugby league career

Playing information
- Position: Fullback
Club
Years	Team	Pld	T	G	FG	P
1911–12	Dewsbury
Medal record
Men's rugby union
Representing Great Britain
Olympic Games
Silver medal – second place	1908 London	Team competition

Edward John Jackett (4 July 1878 – 11 November 1935), known as John Jackett, was an English rugby union player, who represented the England national rugby union team, the British Lions, and competed in the 1908 Summer Olympics for Great Britain. He is the elder brother of Richard ″Dick″ Jackett, who was also in the Great Britain team which won the Olympic silver medal.

== Early years ==
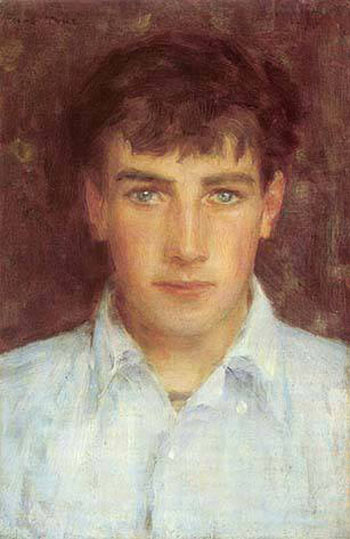
Portrait of Jackett in 1899 by Henry Scott Tuke

He was born in Falmouth, Cornwall and played for Falmouth RFC. On 8 February 1901, Jackett appeared at Falmouth County Court for the non-payment of damages to Caroline Amelia Oliver of Portscatho for a breach-of-promise of marriage. He had been ordered in the High Court, the previous February, to pay £150 damages and £39 costs. His employment, at the time of the County Court case, was stated to be an artist's model. He lived at Henry Tuke's residence. A month later, on 8 March, he was ordered to pay 5 shillings monthly. On 11 May 1901, he left for Kimberley in South Africa on the steamer Briton, travelling with two other rugby players, W Christophers and F Toy, where they joined the Cape Mounted Police. He returned to Cornwall and became Cornish Cycling champion.

== Rugby union career ==
He joined Leicester Tigers in 1904 and played 183 times for the club over the next seven years. He also represented Cornwall 52 times and was capped for England thirteen times between 1905 and 1909. He also played against the touring South Africa team on their 1906 tour of Great Britain. He took part in the 1908 British Lions tour to New Zealand and Australia. Jackett was also a member of the Cornish rugby union team, which, representing Great Britain, won the 1908 Olympic silver medal on 26 October 1908.

== Rugby league career ==
In 1911 Jackett moved north to manage a theatre in Dewsbury, and joined Northern Rugby Football Union (rugby league) club Dewsbury, he played fullback in Dewsbury's 8-5 victory over Oldham in the 1911–12 Challenge Cup Final during the 1911-12 season at Headingley, Leeds on Saturday 27 April 1912 in front of a crowd of 16,000.

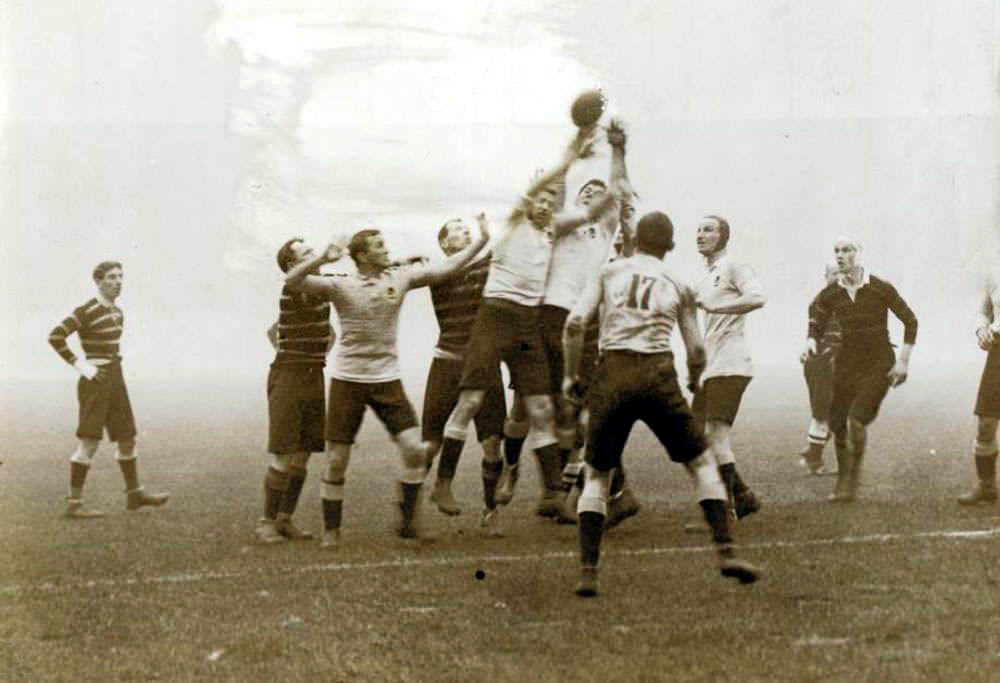
1908 Olympic Gold Final Wallabies v Cornwall

== See also ==
- Rugby union in Cornwall
- Rugby union at the 1908 Summer Olympics
