= Arthur Wilson (rugby union) =

England international rugby union player & British Army officer

- Born: Arthur James Wilson; 29 December 1886 Newcastle upon Tyne, England, United Kingdom
- Died: 31 July 1917 (aged 30) Pilckem Ridge, Passchendaele salient, Belgium

Rugby union career
- Position: Forward
Amateur team(s)
Years	Team	Apps	(Points)
- Camborne School of Mines
International career
Years	Team	Apps	(Points)
1909	England	1	(0)
- Military career
- Allegiance: United Kingdom
- Branch: British Army
- Rank: Private
- Unit: 12 Royal Fusiliers
- Conflicts: First World War: Battle of Passchendaele; Battle of Pilckem Ridge †
Medal record
Men's rugby union
Representing Great Britain
Olympic Games
Silver medal – second place	1908 London	Team competition

Arthur James Wilson (29 December 1886 – 31 July 1917) was a British rugby union player who competed in the 1908 Summer Olympics and represented the England national team. He was a member of the British rugby union team, which won the silver medal.

== Early life ==
Arthur Wilson was born on 29 December 1886 in Newcastle upon Tyne, the son of Henry and Emily Wilson. He attended the Glenalmond College and then the Camborne School of Mines.

After qualifying as a mining engineer at the latter, he worked as such in the Gold Coast Colony (now Ghana) and as a tea planter in India.

== Rugby career ==
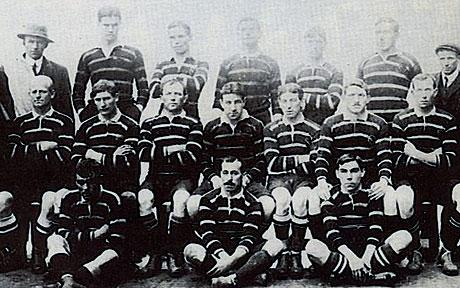
Cornwall rugby olympics 1908

Wilson was selected to play for Cornwall on seventeen occasions. He was part of the Cornwall team that reached the County Championship final for the first time in 1908, against Durham. The match, contested on 28 March 1908 at Redruth, Cornwall, was won by Cornwall 17–3.

In 1908, the Olympic Games were hosted in London, and it was decided to include rugby in the event. Although several international teams had initially entered the tournament, the Home Nations were unable to decide amongst themselves who should represent the United Kingdom, and France, the previous winners, withdrew. The Wallabies were then on a tour of the Home Nations, and were the only team left. The RFU asked Cornwall, the day after Australia had beaten them 18–5, to represent the United Kingdom and to provide some opposition to Australia, rather than allow them to win by default. The match was held on 26 October. The previous day, the Cornwall team took the train to London, stopping off at Plymouth to have lunch and consume alcohol, then continued their festivities on reaching London. On the day of the match, the Cornish team took a tour of the city in the morning, followed by lunch at the Garden Club, at the invitation of the President of the Cornish Rugby Union. The match was played at White City alongside the outdoor swimming pool. Australia won the game 32–3. The Times reported "Cornwall completely failed to find their game, their forwards executed a few good rushes but their backs, without exception, were not only too slow but were continually failing in their fielding. One expected better football from the champion county side." The Australian newspaper The Age remarked: "The Cornwall forwards were good, but their backs were outpaced and beaten by the cleverness of the Australians." At 21 years of age, Wilson was the youngest player on the team, but Australia's Dan Carroll was younger aged 16.

=== International appearances ===
Opposition	Score	Result	Date	Venue	Ref(s)
Ireland	5–11	Won	13 February 1909	Lansdowne Road	

== Military service ==
At the start of World War I, Wilson enlisted in the Royal Welsh Fusiliers, and was killed when serving in the 12th battalion of the Royal Fusiliers in the Battle of Pilckem Ridge, Belgium, reportedly aged 29. He is commemorated at the Menin Gate in Ypres, Belgium.

== See also ==
- List of international rugby union players killed in action during the First World War
- List of Olympians killed in World War I

== Bibliography ==
- McCrery, Nigel (2014). Into Touch: Rugby Internationals Killed in the Great War. Pen and Sword. ISBN 978-1473833210.
