= Richard Jackett =

English rugby union player

Olympic medal record

Men's Rugby union
Silver medal – second place	1908 London	Team competition

Richard Jackett (1 December 1880 – 27 July 1960) was a Cornish rugby union player who played his club rugby for Falmouth R.F.C. and between 1905 and 1914 Leicester Tigers where he made 59 appearances scoring 8 tries. He was capped 71 times for Cornwall and was a member of the 1908 County Championship winning team that beat Durham 17–3 in the final played at Redruth in front of 17,000 spectators. He also played in the Cornwall side that represented Great Britain winning a silver medal in the 1908 Summer Olympics at White City Stadium, London losing to Australia in the final 32–3. He was the brother of John Jackett.

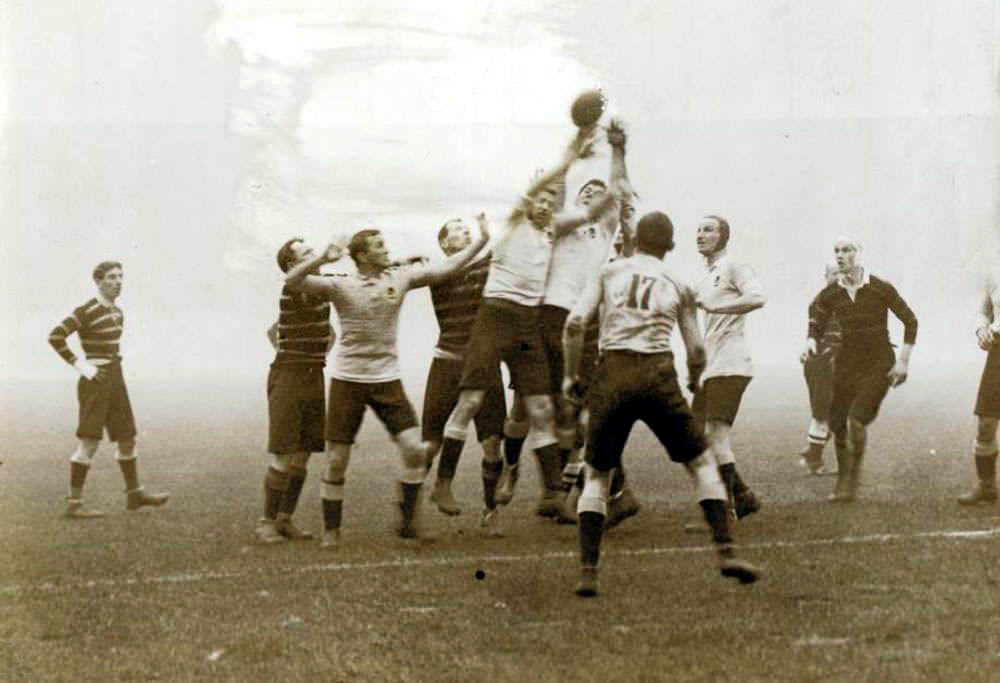
1908 Olympic Gold Final Wallabies v Cornwall.

== See also ==
- Rugby union in Cornwall
- Rugby union at the 1908 Summer Olympics
