= Bert Solomon =

England international rugby union player

- Born: Bert Solomon; 8 March 1885 Redruth, Cornwall
- Died: 30 June 1961 (aged 76) Redruth, Cornwall
- School: Trewirgie School

Rugby union career
- Position: Wing/Centre
Senior career
Years	Team	Apps	(Points)
1903-10	Redruth RFC		
1904-09	Cornwall	26	
International career
Years	Team	Apps	(Points)
1910	England	1	(3)
Medal record
Men's rugby union
Representing Great Britain
Olympic Games
Silver medal – second place	1908 London	Team competition

Bert Solomon (8 March 1885 – 30 June 1961) was a Cornish rugby union player who competed in the 1908 Summer Olympics at White City Stadium, London. He played for Redruth R.F.C. and was capped 26 times for Cornwall.

He was a member of the Cornwall rugby union team, which on 26 October 1908 won the Olympic silver medal for Great Britain. He also played for Cornwall in the County Championship final match against Durham that same year at Redruth, scoring twice in a famous 17-3 victory, Bert was capped by England against Wales in 1910, the first year Twickenham opened and scored a wonderful individual try in an 11-6 win. Although being selected for further matches against Scotland, Ireland, and France, he declined and also declined an invitation to tour with the British and Irish Lions in 1908 to Australia and New Zealand. Around the same time, it was reported that he refused 400 golden sovereigns to sign for a Rugby league team in the north of England.

In 1910, when he was just 25 years old and in his prime, Bert Solomon hung his boots up, and a legend was created.

It is also reported that Bert was a solitary character who liked nothing better than his pigeons. Sometimes, he refused to play for Redruth if his pigeons were still out, and he often had to be coaxed into playing. Such was his skill that he apparently made a difference of 1000 people on a crowd.

A book has been published regarding his life and career.

== See also ==
- Cornish rugby
- Rugby union at the 1908 Summer Olympics
