= James Davey (rugby union) =

British Lions & England international rugby union player

Olympic medal record

Men's Rugby union
Silver medal – second place	1908 London	Team competition

James "Maffer" Davey (25 December 1880 – 21 October 1951) was a British rugby union player who competed in the Rugby event at the 1908 Summer Olympics.

He was born on Christmas Day in Redruth, Cornwall, and played for Redruth R.F.C. as a fly-half. He then spent some years working in the gold mines of the Witwatersrand, captaining Transvaal from 1904 to 1906. On his return to Cornwall he played twice on the losing side for England, once in 1908 against Scotland and once in 1909 against Wales.

"Maffer" was capped 35 times for Cornwall and was a member of the county's famous Championship winning side of 1908 when they beat Durham in the final 17–3 at Redruth.

He was a member of the rugby team that won the silver medal at the 1908 Summer Olympics when Cornwall represented Great Britain, losing to Australia in the final. He also took part in the 1908 British Lions tour to New Zealand and Australia, where he scored 5 tries in 13 appearances playing in one test match against New Zealand.
