= St Ives RFC (Cornwall) =

Rugby union club, based in Cornwall

(England) St Ives RFC
- Full name: St Ives Rugby Football Club
- Union: Cornwall RFU
- Nickname: The Hakes
- Founded: 1889; 137 years ago
- Location: St Ives, Cornwall, England
- Ground: Recreation Ground (Capacity: 3,000 (275 seats))
- Chairman: Russell Baragwanath
- President: Ian Deacon
- Coach(es): Adam Harris & Scott Perkin
- Captain: Jacob Ninnes
- League: Counties 1 Western West
- 2024–25: 8th
Team kit

Official website
- www.stivesswrfc.co.uk

St Ives Rugby Football Club is a Cornish rugby union club that are based in the town of St Ives and play home games at the Recreation Ground, just off Alexandra Road. The club operate a senior men's side as well as several min and junior teams (ages 7 to 16). Following their withdrawal from the level 6 South West 1 West at the start of the 2019–20 season, the club continued to play friendlies for the remainder of the season. The club were readmitted to the league structure for the 2020–21 season, returning to competitive rugby in Cornwall League 2, at level 10, the lowest level St Ives RFC have played in. The season was postponed due to the COVID-19 pandemic. St Ives were then promoted as unbeaten champions at the first attempt in the 2021–22 season and currently play in Counties 1 Western West. The club play a traditional Boxing Day fixture against neighbours Hayle RFC.

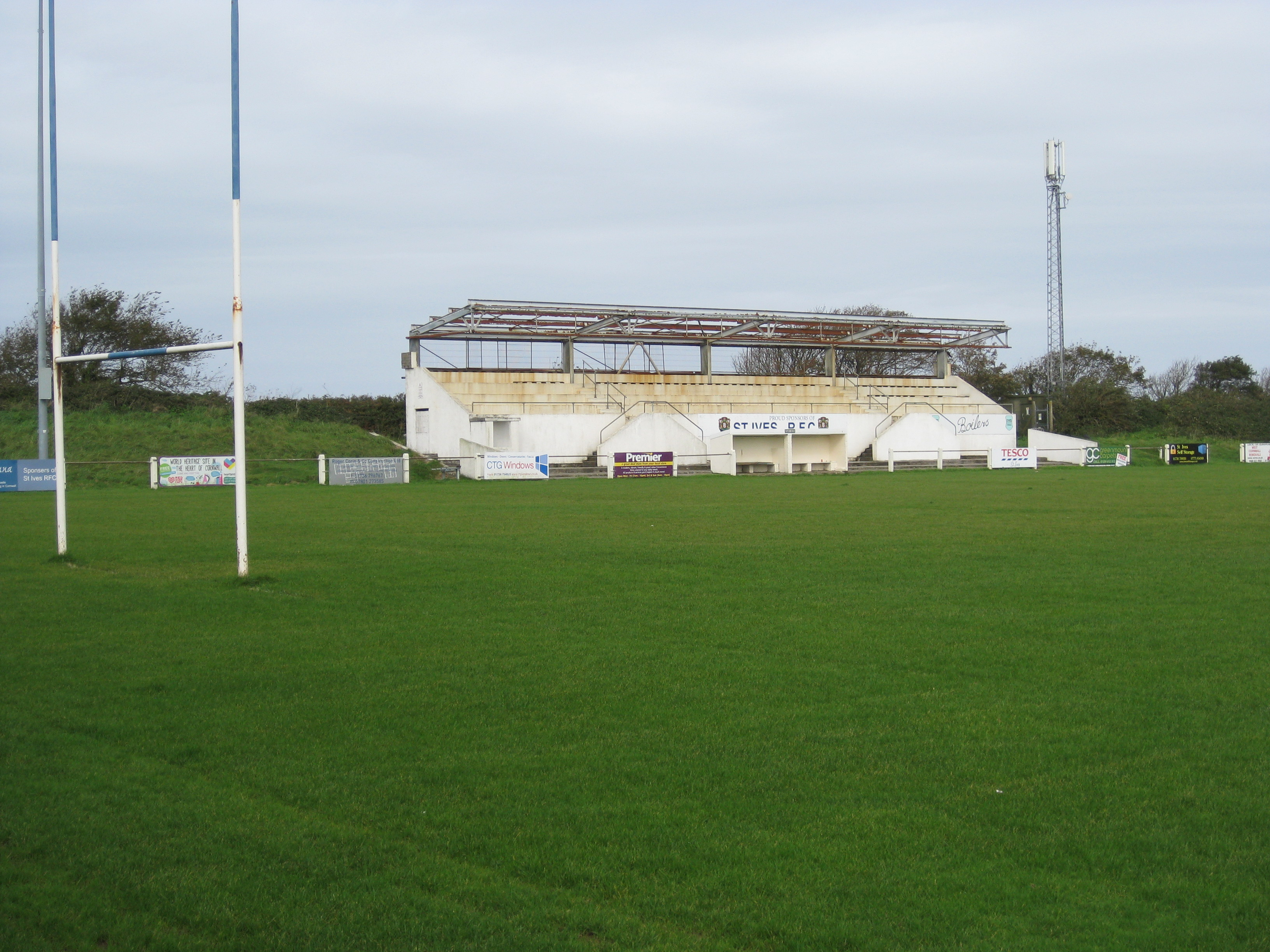
View of stand at the Recreation Ground, home of St Ives RFC

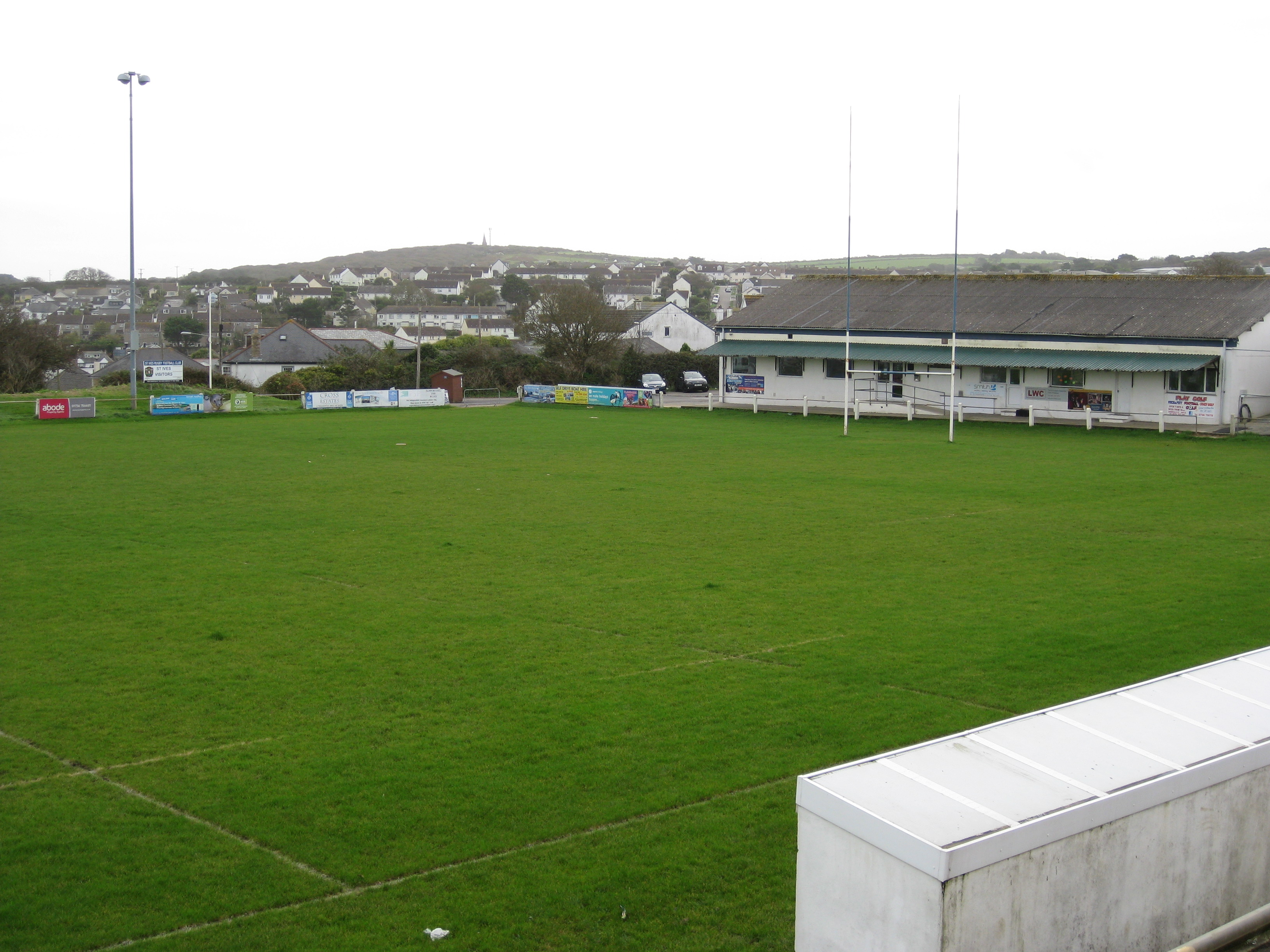
View of the club house at the Recreation Ground, St Ives RFC

== History ==
=== Early years ===
In October 1883 young men of the town were trying to establish a football club, although some years previous the town had cricket and football clubs which, was said, to have gained a good reputation. On Easter Monday, 1885, a team from St Ives played the Pirates of Penzance at Penzance in a match watched by hundreds of spectators. In a ″well-contested game″, Penzance won by three tries and a goal. During the 1880s the game was played by a number of sides including the St Ives Midgets. These local sides ultimately merged towards the end of the decade, and on 12 October 1889, St Ives Rugby Football Club was officially formed.

Early games were played at Lower Carnstabba and then Hellesvean before the club moved to its first proper ground at Higher Tregenna in 1899. Initially, St Ives were seen as a junior club, becoming Cornish junior champions in 1901–02. This changed around 1903–04 when the Cornwall RFU elevated them to senior club status. In the period prior to World War I the club supplied a number of players to the Cornwall county side, with one of these, scrum-half Thomas Wedge, capped several times by England. In 1925 the club left Higher Tregenna to move to the Recreation Ground, off Alexandra Road, where they remain to this day.

=== Glory years ===
In the years following World War II, St Ives went from strength to strength. The 1949–50 season was a very notable one as the club finished as Cornish Merit Table leaders, going unbeaten in 36 games, with Jimmy Fleming setting a club record of 46 tries. This season also saw St Ives purchase the Recreation Ground from Borough Council (prior to this the ground had been leased). During this period the club continued to produce quality players such as Harold Stevens who went on to captain Cornwall as well as represent the Barbarians. The re-introduction of the Cornwall Cup in the late 1960s saw St Ives continue to be one of the most dominant clubs in the county, appearing in six successive finals between 1969–74, winning three of them (including one shared). In 1971–72 the club once more finished as Cornwall Merit Table champions. A year later the club became the first Cornish side to score more than 1,000 points over a single year, while in the same season Jimmy Cocking set a club record of 368 points, including another record of 30 points in a single game. Also of note was the performances of Peter Hendy, who was included in the 1973 England rugby union tour of Fiji and New Zealand. While Hendy never gained a full England cap, he played multiple games for the England under-23 side and England 'A', as well as captaining Cornwall and appearing for the Barbarians.

The years 1979 through to 1986 saw the club enter another period of dominance, winning four more Cornwall Cup titles in this time. They also did well in national competition, first reaching the 3rd round in 1981–82 (losing to Bristol at home in what was first televised game at the club), before going on to become the first Cornish side to reach the quarter-finals of the John Player Cup during the 1982–83 season, eventually being knocked out by Nottingham. The club also saw the emergence of players such as Martin Haag who was capped by England under-19s while at St Ives, before going on to play for Bath and England.

=== League rugby ===
The advent of the leagues in 1987 saw St Ives placed in South West Division One, a league ranked at tier 5 of the English rugby union system. They remained in this division for the next decade, with highlights during this period being a fourth-place finish in 1992–93, James Perkin setting a club record with an incredible 11 tries in one game against Falmouth during the 1993–94 season, and two more (losing) appearances in the Cornwall Cup final. By the end of the 1990s, however, the club were in decline and they were relegated at the end of the 1997–98 season having finished in 11th place, although Mark Rowe did manage did manage to break the club record set by Jimmy Cocking by scoring 34 points in a single game (a feat Billy Peters equaled the following year). Things got even worse the following season as St Ives could only manage 1 win from 22 league games in South West 2 West, finishing bottom of the table and suffered a second successive relegation. St Ives dreadful form continued into the 1999–00 season when they finished bottom of Western Counties West with 0 wins and 18 defeats – only surviving relegation because of RFU restructuring of the league system. The next year the club once more finished bottom of the league table and this time they were relegated.

Having suffered relegation in three out of the last four seasons, falling from tier 5 to 8, St Ives deserved a bit of a break. They did this during 2001–02 by making an instant return to Western Counties West by finishing as runner-up in Tribute Cornwall/Devon behind champions Paignton, dead level on points but ultimately losing out due to the Devon club's superior for/against record. St Ives avoided relegation the following season and by 2004–05 they had achieved another promotion, when they won a promotion play-off 27–5 against Thornbury at home, having initially finished as runner-up to Mounts Bay. The 2004–05 season was also notable due to the coverage of the club by BBC television, following the five sets of brothers who all featured for St Ives in a league game against Crediton during the 2004–05 campaign (a record). The next season was a mirror image of the previous, as St Ives once more finished second in the league behind Mounts Bay, and once more achieved promotion via the play-off, this time beating Swanage & Wareham 26–10 away. The joy of a second promotion in a row was however tinged with sadness, as first team manager Peter Burgin died following a league match against Taunton earlier in the season. The dug out at the Recreation Ground has since been named the 'Peter Burgin Dug Out' in his memory.

The 2007–08 season saw St Ives back in tier 5 for the first time since 1999, having experienced three relegations and three promotions during this period. Unfortunately this yo-yo existence continued as the club had a dreadful campaign in South West 1, finishing in bottom spot with just 1 win and a draw from 22 games. The next year St Ives avoided a further drop and even won their first Cornwall Cup since 1986 (eighth overall), defeating Camborne 10–3 in the final held at Tregorrick Park in St Austell. The following season the club once more reached the final of the Cornwall Cup, this time losing 16–21 to Wadebridge Camels at the Recreation Ground, Camborne, in what was something of an upset.

After a period of success, St Ives once more returned to their yo-yo ways. The 2010–11 season saw the club involved in a relegation dog-fight, eventually going down in 12th place from Tribute South West 1 West despite winning their last match 54–15 away to Ivybridge, as 11th placed Chosen Hill managed a losing bonus point their last game to stay up by just 1 point. Another relegation followed the next year as St Ives finished well adrift at the bottom of Tribute Western Counties West to drop down all the way to tier 8. The club bounced back quickly by finishing as runner-up in Tribute Cornwall/Devon behind Teignmouth in 2012–13, only to drop back down to this division at the end of 2014–15. In 2015–16 St Ives were promoted from Tribute Devon/Cornwall for the third time in the club's history, once more as a runner-up, this time behind champions Bude.

The 2017–18 season proved to be an excellent one for St Ives as they won a league and cup double. First they stormed their way to the Tribute Western Counties West title, finishing 19 points clear of second place Devonport Services to book a return to tier 6 after an absence of six years. Remarkably it was the first league title the club had won since the leagues began back in 1987, despite a number of promotions. Then at the end of April they claimed the Cornwall Cup for the ninth time, with a hard-fought 20–19 win against Wadebridge Camels at the Recreation Ground in Camborne – leaving them just one behind record holders Camborne and Redruth. Following an exodus of players during the summer and a 14–89 defeat on the opening day of the season (2019–20), at Chew Valley, St Ives withdrew from South West One West and will play friendly fixtures for the rest of the season.

After maintaining a list of friendly fixtures and honouring the Cornwall Cup matches for the remainder of the season, St Ives RFC were granted a place in the lowest level of the Cornish league structure for the 2020–21. During this season the club rebuilt a team with many local players returning, leaving the club in a good position to maintain competitive rugby for the foreseeable future. When league fixtures began again in season 2021-22 St Ives were placed at the lowest level in Cornwall Tribute 2, which they won undefeated. In the second half of the season they played in Cornwall Kernow League 1, one of several leagues set up to keep fixtures, competition and player interest during this time. St Ives were undefeated champions. On 16 April they lifted the Cornish Clubs Plate, defeating Lankelly-Fowey in the final 48:10.

== Ground ==
The Recreation Ground is just off Alexandra Road on the outskirts of St Ives overlooking the town, and is about 30 minutes walk from the railway station. It has been occupied by the rugby club since 1925 and consists of a main pitch with a club-house and grandstand, along with grass-banks on three sides. The grandstand has seating capacity for 275, while there is standing space for around 2,750 supporters, bringing the overall capacity to approximately 3,000. Currently the grandstand is missing a roof and some of the shrubbery on the banks needs cutting back, which may affect capacity.

== Season summary ==
Season	League			National Cup(s)		County Cup(s)	
Season	Competition/Level	Position	Points	Competition	Performance	Competition	Performance
1987–88	South West 1 (5)						
1988–89	South West 1 (5)						
1989–90	South West 1 (5)						
1990–91	South West 1 (5)						
1991–92	South West 1 (5)						
1992–93	South West 1 (5)					Cornwall Cup	Runners up
1993–94	South West 1 (6) (Note: RFU restructuring due to creating of Courage League Division 5 meant that South West 1 became a level 6 league.)			Pilkington Cup	2nd round		
1994–95	South West 1 (6)						
1995–96	South West 1 (6)						
1996–97	South West 1 (5) (Note: RFU restructuring due to the cancellation of Courage League Division 5 meant that South West 1 once again became a level 5 league.)	9th	16			Cornwall Cup	Runners up
1997–98	South West 1 (5)	11th (relegated)	11	Tetley's Bitter Cup	2nd round		
1998–99	South West 2 West (6)	12th (relegated)	-2				
1999–00	Western Counties West (7)	10th (Note: Although St Ives finished bottom of Western Counties West at the end of the 1999–00 season there was no relegation due to restructuring of the league system by the RFU.)	0				
2000–01	Western Counties West (7)	11th (relegated)	12			Cornwall Cup	1st round
2001–02	Tribute Cornwall/Devon (8)	2nd (promoted)	25				
2002–03	Western Counties West (7)	3rd	26			Cornwall Cup	2nd round
2003–04	Western Counties West (7)	6th	23	Powergen Intermediate Cup	2nd round	Cornwall Cup	1st round
2004–05	Western Counties West (7)	2nd (promoted via playoff)	38				
2005–06	South West 2 West (6)	2nd (promoted)	35	Powergen Trophy	3rd round		
2006–07	South West 1 (5)	7th	23	EDF Energy Cup	2nd round		
2007–08	South West 1 (5)	12th (relegated)	1	EDF Energy Trophy	2nd round		
2008–09	South West 2 West (6)	4th	26	EDF Energy Intermediate Cup	2nd round	Cornwall Cup	Winners
2009–10	South West 1 West (6) (Note: RFU restructuring for the 2009–10 season meant that South West 2 West was renamed to South West 1 West.)	8th	25			Cornwall Cup	Runners up
2010–11	South West 1 West (6)	12th (relegated)	49 (Note: The 2010–11 season would see the introduction of bonus points into lower league English rugby union (tier 6 and below).)			Cornwall Cup	Semi-finals
2011–12	Western Counties West (7)	14th (relegated)	-5				
2012–13	Cornwall/Devon (8)	2nd (promoted)	104			Cornwall Cup	Semi-finals
2013–14	Western Counties West (7)	12th	39				
2014–15	Western Counties West (7)	14th (relegated)	19			Cornwall Cup	1st round
2015–16	Cornwall/Devon (8)	2nd (promoted)	108			Cornwall Cup	Semi-finals
2016–17	Western Counties West (7)	6th	70			Cornwall Cup	Quarter-finals
2017–18	Western Counties West (7)	1st (promoted)	109			Cornwall Cup	Winners
2018–19	South West 1 West (6)	6th	82			Cornwall Cup	Runners up
2019–20	South West 1 West (6)	Withdrew following defeat in their opening match				Cornwall Cup	2nd round
2021–22	Cornwall League 2 (1)	Promoted to Counties 2 Tribute Cornwall in new league system	40			Cornwall Cup	Plate champions
Green background stands for either league champions (with promotion) or cup winners. Blue background stands for promotion without winning league or losing cup finalists. Pink background stands for relegation.

== Honours ==
- Cornwall Junior champions: 1901–02
- Cornwall Senior League runner-up: 1903–04
- Cornish Merit Table champions (2): 1949–50, 1971–72
- Cornwall Cup winners (9): 1969, 1970, 1971, 1979, 1981, 1982, 1986, 2009, 2018 (Note: Cornwall Cup wins includes 1 shared title in 1969.)
- Western Counties (north v west) promotion play-off winner: 2004–05
- South West 2 (east v west) promotion play-off winner: 2005–06
- Tribute Western Counties West champions: 2017–18
- Tribute Cornwall 2 champions: 2021-22, Cornwall Kernow League 1 champions 2022, Cornwall Clubs Plate champions 2022.

== Playing record ==
Season	P	W	D	L	F	A	Notes [ref]
1903–04	20	11	3	6	124	77	First season in senior rugby

== Notable former players ==
- Martin Haag - lock who played early career with St Ives before moving to Bath in 1987. Capped twice by England. Currently a coach.
- Peter Hendy - flanker who played for the club in the 1970s and 80s. Capped by England under-23s and England 'A' as well as captaining Cornwall and appearing for the Barbarians.
- Pete Samu - flanker who spent 2 seasons with the club before moving to New Zealand where he has since played Super Rugby for the Crusaders. He joined the Brumbies for the 2019 Super Rugby season and by July 2022 had gained 22 appearances for Australia.
- (England) Harold Stevens - three quarter back who had two spells at the club in the 1940s to the 1960s. Captained Cornwall and achieved 60 caps as well as appearing for the Barbarians. Also played for Redruth.
- Thomas Wedge - scrum-half who played for the club during the early 20th century. Represented Cornwall and twice capped by England. Also part of the British team that won a silver medal at the 1908 Summer Olympics.
- Ian Sanders - scrum half who played his early career with St Ives before moving to Bath, Gloucester and the Exeter Chiefs. Finally finishing his playing days back at St Ives, where he remains involved. Ian also played for England 'A’, Cornwall and appeared for the Barbarians.

== See also ==
- Cornish rugby
