= Barrie Bennetts =

British Lions & England international rugby union player

- Born: Barzillai Beckerleg Bennetts; 14 July 1883 Penzance, Cornwall
- Died: 26 July 1958 (aged 74) Penzance
- Height: 5 ft 8 in (173 cm)
- Weight: 11 st 0 lb (154 lb; 70 kg)
- School: Bridgend College, London
- Occupation: Solicitor

Rugby union career
- Position: wing/centre
Amateur team(s)
Years	Team	Apps	(Points)
1901–	Penzance RFC		
1902–12	Cornwall	42	
1905	Richmond		
- Redruth
- Devonport Albion
1907–1910	Leicester Tigers	2	
International career
Years	Team	Apps	(Points)
1908–11	Barbarians	9	(3)
1909	England	2	(0)
1910	Combined British	4	(23)

Barzillai Beckerleg Bennetts MBE, also known as Barrie Bennetts (14 July 1883 – 26 July 1958) born in Penzance and was a Cornish rugby union player who played at international level, touring Argentina with the 1910 Combined British rugby union side, an early incarnation of the British and Irish Lions.

== Personal life ==
Barzillai Beckerleg Bennetts was born in Penzance in 1883 to Mr J H Bennetts, a local coal merchant. He was educated at Bridgend College, London and trained in the legal profession. By 1910 he was a solicitor for Boase and Bennetts in Penzance. He excelled in many sports and represented Cornwall at cricket, golf and hockey, and was President of the Cornwall RFU from 1945 to 1950. During the First World War he joined the Argyll and Sutherland Highlanders, seeing action in France and being mentioned in dispatches. At the age of 57 he saw further military service when he was one of the first, in Penzance, to volunteer for the newly formed Home Guard. Bennetts was awarded the MBE for services to the Royal National Lifeboat Institution (RNLI) in 1949 and was made a Lifetime Governorship for the RNLI in 1957. He died in 1958 at his brother's home in Alverton, Penzance.

== Sports ==
Bennetts was an accomplished sportsman excelling in many sports including football, playing for Penzance Football Club and appearing in four Cornwall Senior Cup finals. He played cricket at minor counties level for Cornwall, making eleven appearances between 1906 and 1914. He also represented Cornwall at golf and hockey, and tennis would have probably been on the list if there was a Cornwall tennis team at the time. While in London training to be a solicitor he played rugby for Richmond. Bennetts played twice for Leicester Tigers, once in 1907 and once in 1910.

=== Combined British Team to Argentina ===
	Date	Opponents	Venue	Result	Score	Notes
1	1910 June 12	Argentina	Flores	W	28 – 3	Argentina's first International match

=== England ===
	Date	Opponents	Venue	Result	Score	Notes
1	1909 Jan 9	Australia	Rectory Field, Blackheath	L	3 – 9	First England v Australia International
2	1909 Jan 16	Wales	Cardiff Arms Park	L	0 – 8	Home International Championship, with four Cornish players in the England team

== See also ==
- Penzance RFC
