= Rugby union in Cornwall =

Popular sport

Cornwall Rugby Football Union
- Sport: Rugby union
- Jurisdiction: Cornwall
- Abbreviation: CRFU
- Founded: 1884; 142 years ago
- Affiliation: RFU
- Headquarters: Cornwall
- President: John Sumnall
- Chairman: David Saunter
- Coach: Graham Dawe
- Sponsor: O'Neills

Official website
- www.crfu.co.uk
- (Cornwall)

Rugby union is Cornwall's most popular spectator sport with a large following. The followers of the national side are dubbed Trelawny's Army. In 1991 and 1999 Cornwall won the County Championship final played at Twickenham Stadium, beating Yorkshire and Gloucestershire respectively to win the Cup. They had another strong spell in the 2010s, reaching seven of the eight finals contested between 2013 and 2022 (meeting either Cheshire or Lancashire on every occasion), winning four of them.

Cornish rugby has produced many fine players who have played at the international level, including Phil Vickery, Trevor Woodman and Graham Dawe (England), Stack Stevens (England and British and Irish Lions), Andy Reed (Scotland and the Lions), and many others.

The Cornish rugby team can also boast an Olympic silver medal: in 1908, they won the County Championship for the first time and the prize was to represent Great Britain at rugby in the 1908 Olympic Games. They lost to Australia 32–3 in the final, and remain the only county side to represent Great Britain at rugby in the Olympics.

== CRFU ==
Flag of the CRFU

The Cornwall Rugby Football Union (CRFU) was formed on 15 October 1884 at a meeting held at the Royal Hotel in Truro. The meeting was attended by representatives from clubs at Redruth, Falmouth, Penzance, Truro, Hayle & Tregony. It is a union of 37 rugby union clubs which includes most rugby union clubs in Cornwall (St Columba and Torpoint RFC is a member of the Devon Rugby Football Union), the open-age Cornwall representative side and representative teams at various age groups. The CRFU are members of the Rugby Football Union (RFU), the governing body for rugby union in England. The CRFU organises three annual knockout cup competitions – the Cornwall Super Cup, Cornwall Cup and Cornwall Clubs Cup, with the Cornwall Cup stretching back to 1967. The Cornwall Super Cup is played between the Launceston and Redruth (doubling up as National League 2 South league games between the sides), the Cornwall Cup is for teams based between tiers 6 and 12 in the English league system and finally the Cornwall Clubs Cup is for teams in the regional Cornish leagues. The Cornwall Cup used to be the premier competition with the top sides such as the Cornish Pirates, Launceston, Mounts Bay and Redruth taking part but has been superseded in recent years by the Super Cup, itself downsized to just the two teams due to the demands of the modern game both in terms of fixture congestion and the increased physical toll on players. All cups are currently sponsored by Tribute Ales.

== History ==
Team kit

The Cornish rugby tradition has deep roots, stretching back before the game was even codified. A form of folk football, known as Cornish hurling was highly popular there, and is still played in two towns in Cornwall. It is possible that the former popularity of this game paved the way for the rugby code. Cornwall's original colours were yellow and red hoops on black jerseys. these were soon changed to yellow and black squares. During the 1894-5 seasons the side played in white jerseys, finally adopting the current black and gold hoops in the 1895-6 season.

Cornish Rugby has had the honour to have played host to many international touring rugby teams over the years including New Zealand, Australia, South Africa, New Zealand Māori, France, Romania, the USA, Canada, Japan and the Soviet Union.

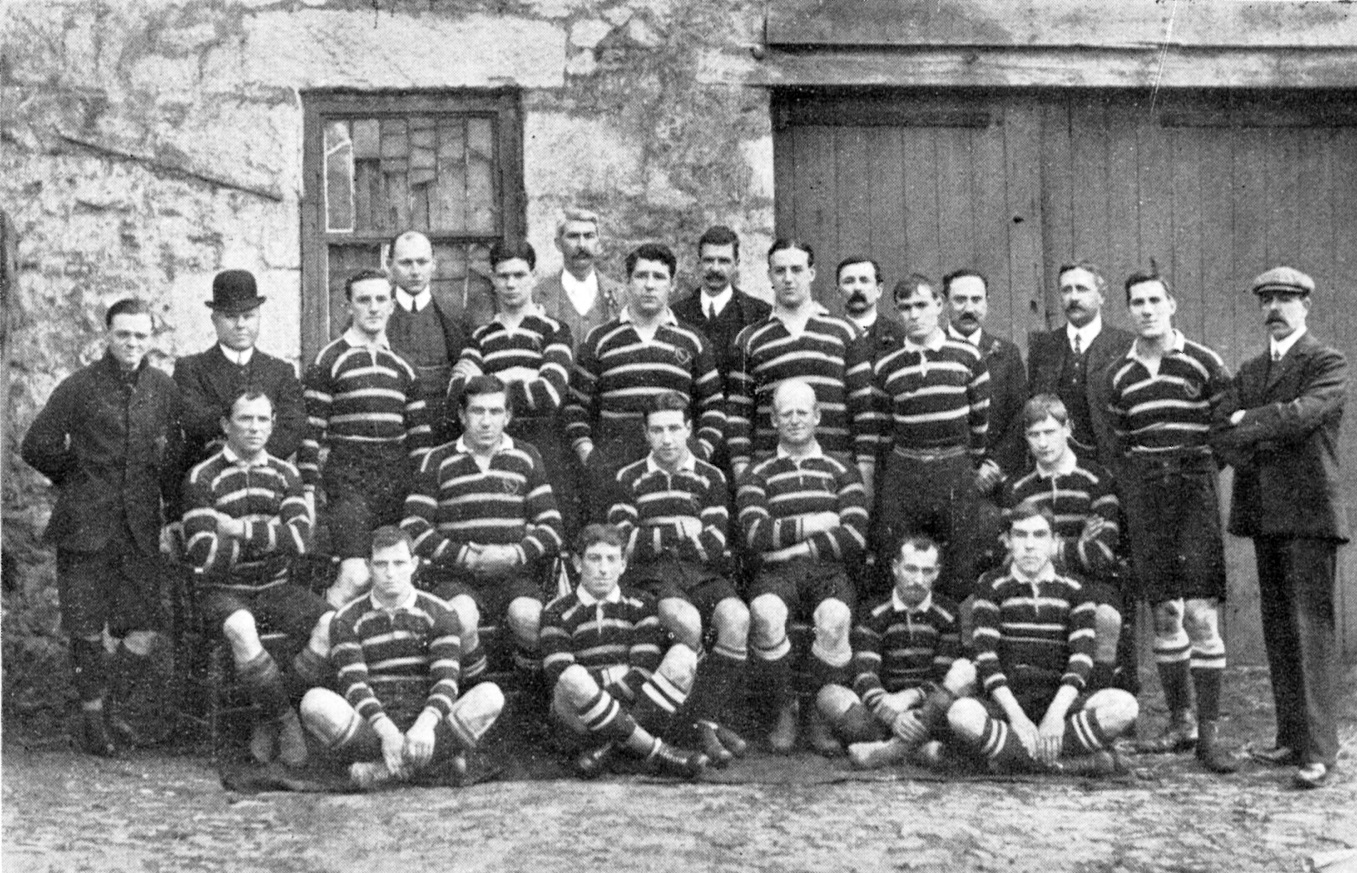
The Cornwall RFU team that won the county championship, 1907-08

One of the most important times of the year in a Cornish rugby fan's calendar is the County Championship. Like the 1900 games, three teams entered: Australasia (representing Australia and New Zealand), France, and Great Britain (which included the whole of the United Kingdom of Great Britain and Ireland). France pulled themselves from the event prior to the commencement of the tournament, being unable to field a representative team. Cornwall won the championship for the first time in 1908, when they played in front of 17,000 fans at Redruth. The game was against Durham, also known for its mining, this time coal not tin. Cornwall won the game 17–3, scoring 5 tries. The added incentive for the winner was the chance to represent Great Britain at the 1908 Summer Olympics. The choice of Cornwall was controversial, as only three of their players had ever represented England, as well as the fact that Australia, who had been on a tour of the United Kingdom, had defeated them 18 points to five.

Two other countries entered the 1908 Summer Olympics, France and Australasia, the name of a combined team from Australia and New Zealand. France withdrew before the tournament which left Great Britain (Cornwall) playing Australasia. The final score was 32–3 to Australasia with Bert Solomon managing to score a try for Great Britain.

Australasia's team, the Wallabies, was already on tour in Britain, while the best Anglo-Welsh players were on tour in New Zealand at the time. Great Britain was therefore represented by the Cornwall county team, who were chosen by the RFU as an appropriate side after they defeated Durham in the 1907 English county championship.

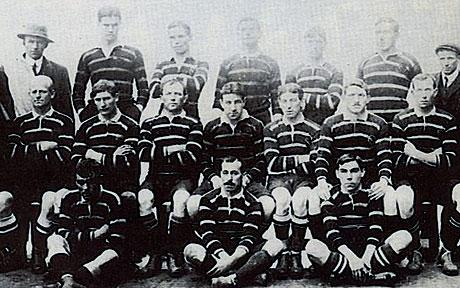
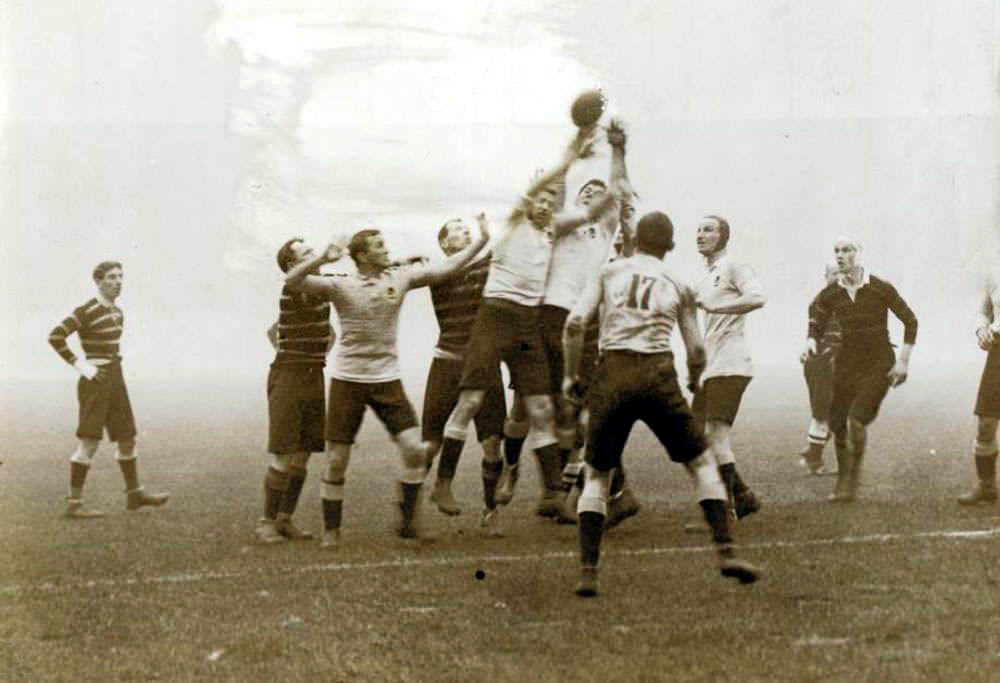
Two moments of Cornwall side that represented Great Britain at the 1908 Summer Olympics: A team formation (left) and the final match v Australasia (right)

As expected, Australasia defeated Great Britain, claiming the gold medal, the score being 32 points to three. The match at the White City Stadium was played under poor conditions, in fog and with a slippery field.

Cornwall reached the Championship final again in 1909, 1928, 1958, 1969 and 1989 but had to wait until 1991 before re-claiming the trophy. In a final that most Cornish fans will remember forever, Cornwall played Yorkshire at Twickenham in front of 54,000 fans, the majority of which were supporting Cornwall. In a game that had everything, Cornwall found themselves trailing at 16-3 down after 54 minutes, having been tricked when Yorkshire ran a penalty that the Cornish believed they had indicated to kick. Cornwall fought back to draw level at 16-16 after 80 minutes, and even missed the conversion that would have given them victory in normal time. The game then went into extra time when Cornwall managed to continue their scoring. The final score was 29–20 to Cornwall which sent the fans into a state of total elation. Richard Nanckivell's two tries were the inspiration that they could win and Tommy Bassett and Billy Peters put the icing on the cake in extra-time for Cornwall's first title since 1908. Cornwall managed to reach the final again in both 1992 and 1998, losing both, and it was not until 1999 when they met Gloucester in the final that Cornwall managed to win the Championship again.

Cornwall play most of their home games at Redruth R.F.C. and Camborne RFC but matches have also been played at Penzance & Newlyn and Launceston.

The premier club side in Cornwall are the Cornish Pirates (recently renamed from Penzance & Newlyn RFC) who play in the RFU Championship. They are hoping to increase their fanbase by appealing to Cornish nationalist sentiment to help them gain promotion to the Aviva Premiership. Launceston Rugby Club ("The Cornish All Blacks") have recently (2007 season) been promoted to the National Division One. Redruth R.F.C. ("The Reds") play in National Division Two and also get good support. Mount's Bay have this season 2007–08 began their campaign in National Division Three, South, leading the league for the entire season they are at season end promoted to National Division Two for the 2008/09 season. The other major Cornish club sides who play in the South West 1, 2 West, Western Counties West and Cornwall & Devon leagues are Bude, Camborne, Falmouth, Hayle, Newquay Hornets Penryn, St Austell, St. Ives, Saltash, Truro and Wadebridge Camels.

== Motto ==
Fethy Po Fyllel An Gwarry Ha Tra Nahen! (Cornish for "Win or Lose, The Game and Nothing Else" !)

== 1908 Centenary celebration match ==
As part of the centenary celebrations, the British Olympic Association arranged a match between Australia and the Barbarians which was held at Wembley Stadium on 3 December 2008. The Barbarian players, who normally wear their club socks, all wore black and gold socks to represent Cornwall, in a game which Australia won 11–8.

== Cornish International and touring club friendlies ==
- New Zealand 1905, 1924 (at Camborne RFC)
- Australia 1908 (twice) - GB Olympic Silver medal (at Camborne RFC and White City Stadium)
- South Africa 1906, 1912 (at Redruth RFC)
- Maoris 1926 (at Falmouth RFC)
- Sélection française 1969 (at Clermont Ferrand)
- France "B" 1970 (at Redruth RFC)
- Comité de Rugby du Lyonnais 1971, 1972 (at Vienne and Camborne RFC)
- Romania 1972 (at Redruth RFC)
- USA 1977 (Cornwall won 12–11) (at Camborne RFC)
- Canada 1979 (at Redruth RFC)
- South African Barbarians 1979, 1993 (at Camborne RFC and Redruth RFC)
- Japan 1986 (at Camborne RFC)
- NZ Barbarians 1987 (at Redruth RFC)
- Soviet Union (12–12) 1989 (at Redruth RFC)
- Ulster 1991 (at Redruth RFC)
- Ulster 1992 (at Belfast)
- Crawshays RFC (at Camborne RFC)
- Diok 1993 (at Leiden, Netherlands)
- Hilversum 1993 (at Hilversum)
- Impalas 1993 (at Amersfoort)
- Cork Constitution 1993 (at Redruth RFC)
- Canterbury (NZ) 1994 (at Camborne RFC)

(Cornwall players have also represented Cornwall & Devon and South-West Division teams)

== County Championship finals ==
As of 2022 Cornwall have won the Bill Beaumont Cup (County Championship) seven times: 1908, 1991, 1999, 2015, 2016, 2019, 2022.

Year	Winner	Home team	Score	Away team	Venue	Notes
1908	Cornwall	Cornwall	17–3	Durham County	Recreation Ground, Redruth	
1909	Durham County	Durham County	12–0	Cornwall	West Hartlepool	
1928	Yorkshire	Yorkshire	12–8	Cornwall	Bradford	
1958	Warwickshire	Warwickshire	16–8	Cornwall	Coundon Road, Coventry	
1969	Lancashire	Cornwall	9–11	Lancashire	Recreation Ground, Redruth	

Since 1984 the finals have been played at Twickenham:

Year	Winner	Score	Runner-up	Venue	Notes
1989	Durham County	13–9	Cornwall	Twickenham Stadium	
1991	Cornwall	29–20	Yorkshire	Twickenham Stadium	AET, 20–20 after 80 minutes.
1992	Lancashire	9–6	Cornwall	Twickenham Stadium	
1998	Cheshire	21–14	Cornwall	Twickenham Stadium	
1999	Cornwall	25–15	Gloucestershire	Twickenham Stadium	
2001	Yorkshire	47–19	Cornwall	Twickenham Stadium	
2013	Lancashire	35–26	Cornwall	Twickenham Stadium	
2014	Lancashire	35–26	Cornwall	Twickenham Stadium	
2015	Cornwall	18–13	Lancashire	Twickenham Stadium	
2016	Cornwall	35–13	Cheshire	Twickenham Stadium	
2017	Lancashire	19–8	Cornwall	Twickenham Stadium	
2019	Cornwall	14–12	Cheshire	Twickenham Stadium	
2022	Cornwall	37-24	Cheshire	Twickenham Stadium	

2026

Lancashire 24-39 Cornwall Rugby Football Union

== Players with 50+ caps for Cornwall ==
- 102 Tony Cook
- 88 C. R. Johns; 86 P. J. Hendy; 83 C. B. Stevens; 70 Richard Jackett
- 69 D. Weeks; 68 J. May; 67 R. G. Corin; 65 J. Atkinson; 64 G. Bate; 62 R. F. S. Harris; 61 R. Jennings; 60 H. Stevens; 60 P. J. B. Mitchell
- 56 R. Keast; 56 A. Bick; 55 T. A. Pryor; 54 T. Bidgood; 54 R. W. Hosen; 54 G. Williams; 53 C. J. Durant; 53 P. J. Winnan; 52 T. Palmer; 52 Nicholas Tregurtha; 52 K. C. Plummer; 51 A. L. Semmens; 51 G. Champion; 50 John Jackett; 50 A. Williams; 50 B. J. Trevaskis; 50 K. Thomas

== Cornish players to have toured with the British and Irish Lions ==
- E. J. Jackett (Australia and New Zealand 1908)
- J. Davey (Australia and New Zealand 1908)
- F. S. Jackson (Australia and New Zealand 1908)
- B. B. Bennetts (Argentina 1910)
- R. Jennings (Australia and New Zealand 1930)
- V. G. Roberts (Australia and New Zealand 1950)
- M. C. Thomas (Australia and New Zealand 1950 & 1959)
- R. A. W. Sharp (South Africa 1962)
- C. B. Stevens (Australia and New Zealand 1971)
- A. Reed (New Zealand 1993)
- P. A. Vickery (Australia 2001, South Africa 2009)
- J. T. Nowell (New Zealand 2017)
- L. A. Cowan-Dickie (South Africa 2021)

== Affiliated clubs ==
There are currently 37 clubs affiliated with the union, most of which have teams at both senior and junior level.

- Bodmin
- Bolingey Barbarians
- Bude
- Camborne
- Camborne School of Mines
- Camelford
- Cornwall Fire & Rescue Service
- Cornish Pirates
- Falmouth
- Hayle RFC
- Helston
- Illogan Park
- Isles of Scilly
- Lankelly-Fowey
- Lanner
- Launceston
- Liskeard-Looe
- Liskeard Leopards
- London Cornish (Note: London Cornish are joint members of both the Cornwall RFU and Middlesex RFU.)
- Newquay Hornets
- Penryn
- Penzance & Newlyn
- Perranporth
- Pirates Amateurs
- Redruth
- Redruth Albany
- RNAS Culdrose
- Roseland
- Saltash (Note: Saltash are joint members of both the Cornwall RFU and Devon RFU.)
- St Agnes
- St Austell
- St Ives
- St Just
- Stithians
- Truro
- Veor
- Wadebridge Camels

== Cornwall club competitions ==
The Cornwall RFU currently runs the following competitions for clubs in Cornwall:

=== Leagues ===
- Tribute Cornwall/Devon (alongside Devon RFU) – league ranked at tier 8 of the English rugby union system for clubs that are based in either Cornwall, Devon and occasionally Somerset
- Cornwall League 1 – tier 9 league
- Cornwall League 2 – tier 10 league

=== Cups ===
- Cornwall Cup – initially founded in 1896, currently open to clubs between tiers 6-8
- Cornwall Clubs Cup – founded in 1897, open to clubs at tiers 9-10

=== Discontinued competitions ===
- Cornwall Super Cup – founded in 2007, and ran irregularly until 2017. It was open to the top Cornish national league clubs (tiers 4-5 of the English rugby union system).

== See also ==
- Rugby union in Cornwall (before 1900)
- Rugby union at the 1908 Summer Olympics
- List of topics related to Cornwall
- South West Division
- English rugby union system
- Rugby union in England
- Rugby union in the British Isles
