= Brosius =

Brosius is a surname. Notable people with the surname include:

- Charlton Brosius, American tug-of-war competitor
- Eric Brosius, American musician and video game developer
- Fernand Brosius (1934–2014), Luxembourgish footballer
- Frauke Brosius-Gersdorf (born 1971), German legal scientist and university professor of public law
- George Brosius, American gymnast
- Jürgen Brosius (born 1948), German evolutionary biologist
- Laura Brosius, German football player
- Marriott Henry Brosius, member of the U.S. Congress from Pennsylvania
- Scott Brosius, American baseball player
- Terri Brosius, American musician and video game developer
