= Tug of war at the Summer Olympics =

- IOC Code: TOW
- Governing body: TWIF
- Events: 1 (men)

Summer Olympics
- 1896; 1900; 1904; 1908; 1912; 1920; 1924; 1928; 1932; 1936; 1948; 1952; 1956; 1960; 1964; 1968; 1972; 1976; 1980; 1984; 1988; 1992; 1996; 2000; 2004; 2008; 2012; 2016; 2020; 2024; 2028; 2032
- Medalists

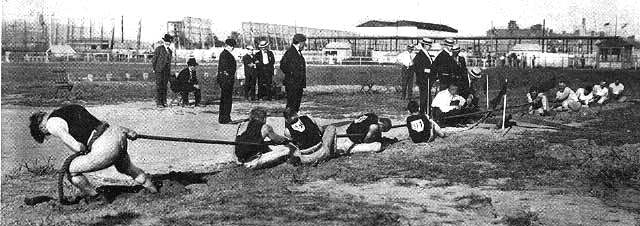
Tug of war competition in 1904 Summer Olympics.

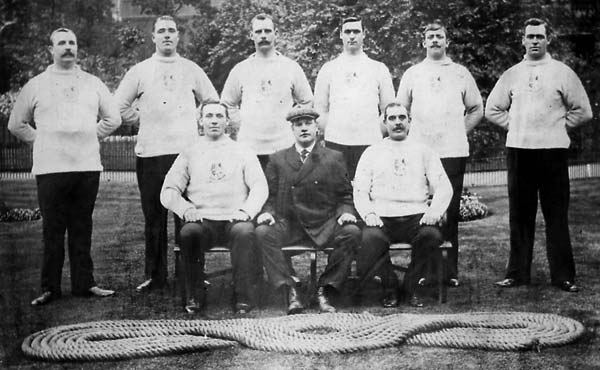
The victorious City of London Police team that won the tug of war gold medal at the London Olympics in 1908. (Back row - left to right): Frederick Merriman, John James Shepherd, Edwin Mills, Albert Ireton, Frederick Goodfellow, Frederick Humphreys (Front row - left to right): Edward Barrett, Henry Duke (Captain), William Hirons

Tug of war was contested as a team event in the Summer Olympics at the Games of every Olympiad from 1900 to 1920. Originally the competition was entered by groups called clubs. A country could enter more than one club in the competition, making it possible for one country to earn multiple medals. This happened in 1904, when the United States won all three medals, and in 1908 when the podium was occupied by three British teams. Sweden was also among the top countries with two medals, one as a member of the mixed team.

During its time as an Olympic sport, it was considered to be part of the Olympic athletics programme, although the sports of tug of war and athletics are now considered distinct.

After the 1920 Games, the International Olympic Committee decided to streamline the Olympic program to manage the number of sports and participants. As part of this effort, Tug of War and several other sports were removed from the Olympic program in the following years.

== Medal table ==
All-time tug of war medal table
Rank	NOC	Gold	Silver	Bronze	Total
1	Great Britain	2	2	1	5
2	United States	1	1	1	3
3	Mixed team	1	0	0	1
3	Sweden	1	0	0	1
5	France	0	1	0	1
5	Netherlands	0	1	0	1
7	Belgium	0	0	1	1
Totals (7 entries)		5	5	3	13

== Medal winners ==
Games	Gold	Silver	Bronze
1900 Paris	Mixed team Edgar Aabye (DEN); August Nilsson (SWE); Eugen Schmidt (DEN); Gustaf Söderström (SWE); Karl Staaf (SWE); Charles Winckler (DEN)	France; Roger Basset; Jean Collas; Charles Gondouin; Joseph Roffo; Émile Sarrade; Francisco Henríquez de Zubiría (COL)	none - only two teams competed
1904 St. Louis	United States; Patrick Flanagan; Sidney Johnson; Conrad Magnusson; Henry Seiling; Oscar Olson (NOR)	United States; Max Braun; August Rodenberg; Charles Rose; William Seiling; Orrin Upshaw	United States; Oscar Friede; Charles Haberkorn; Harry Jacobs; Charles Thias; Frank Kugler (GER)
1908 London	Great Britain; Edward Barrett; Frederick Goodfellow; William Hirons; Albert Ireton; Frederick Humphreys; Frederick Merriman; Edwin Mills; John James Shepherd	Great Britain; Thomas Butler; James Clarke; William Greggan; Alexander Kidd; Daniel Lowey; Patrick Philbin; George Smith; Thomas Swindlehurst	Great Britain; Walter Chaffe; Joseph Dowler; Ernest Ebbage; Thomas Homewood; Alexander Munro; William Slade; Walter Tammas; James Woodget
1912 Stockholm	Sweden; Arvid Andersson; Adolf Bergman; Johan Edman; Erik Algot Fredriksson; August Gustafsson; Carl Jonsson; Erik Larsson; Carl Lindström	Great Britain; Walter Chaffe; Joseph Dowler; Frederick Humphreys; Mathias Hynes; Edwin Mills; Alexander Munro; John Sewell; John James Shepherd	none - only two teams competed
1920 Antwerp	Great Britain; George Canning; Frederick Holmes; Frederick Humphreys; Edwin Mills; John Sewell; John James Shepherd; Harry Stiff; Ernest Thorne	Netherlands; Wilhelmus Bekkers; Johannes Hengeveld; Sijtse Jansma; Henk Janssen; Antonius van Loon; Willem van Loon; Marinus van Rekum; Willem van Rekum	Belgium; Édouard Bourguignon; Alphonse Ducatillon; Rémy Maertens; Christin Piek; Henri Pintens; Charles Van den Broeck; François Van Hoorenbeek; Gustave Wuyts

== Individual medal leaders ==
Only individuals with multiple wins are included.

Individual medal leaders in tug of war at the Olympics
Athlete	NOC	Olympics	Gold	Silver	Bronze	Total	Refs
Frederick Humphreys	Great Britain	1908, 1912, 1920	2	1	0	3	
Edwin Mills	Great Britain	1908, 1912, 1920	2	1	0	3	
John James Shepherd	Great Britain	1908, 1912, 1920	2	1	0	3	
John Sewell	Great Britain	1912, 1920	1	1	0	2	

== Nations ==
Teams consisted of 6 members in 1900, 5 members in 1904, and 8 members in 1908, 1912, and 1920.

In 1900, three Danish pullers and three Swedish pullers competed together as a mixed team, winning first place; the same year, one Colombian puller joined five French pullers in a mixed team that won second place. In 1904, a mixed team of one German puller and 4 United States pullers won third place.

Nation	00	04	08	12	20
Belgium					8
Colombia	1				
Denmark	3				
France	5				
Great Britain			24	8	8
Germany		1			
Greece		5			
Italy					8
Netherlands					8
South Africa		5			
Sweden	3		8	8	
United States		19	8		8
No. of nations	3	3	3	2	5
No. of pullers	12	30	40	16	40

== See also ==
- List of Olympic venues in discontinued events
