= Rekum =

Rekum may refer to:

- Rekum, Bremen, a district of Bremen, Germany

== People with that surname ==
- Marinus van Rekum (1884–1955), Dutch tug of war competitor, brother of Willem
- Willem van Rekum (1892–1961), Dutch tug of war competitor, brother of Marinus
