= Frederick Holmes =

Frederick Holmes may refer to:

- Frederick Holmes (athlete) (1886–1944), British Olympic tug of war competitor
- Frederick William Holmes (1889–1969), British Army officer and Victoria Cross recipient
- Frederick Hale Holmes (1812–1875), professor of chemistry and pioneer of electric lighting
- Frederick S. Holmes (1865–1948), American safe and vault engineer
- Fred Holmes (Frederick Clarence Holmes, 1878–1956), Major League Baseball player

== See also ==
- Frederic L. Holmes (1932–2003), American historian of science
