= Albert Ireton =

British boxer

Olympic medal record

Men's Tug of war
Gold medal – first place	1908 London	Team

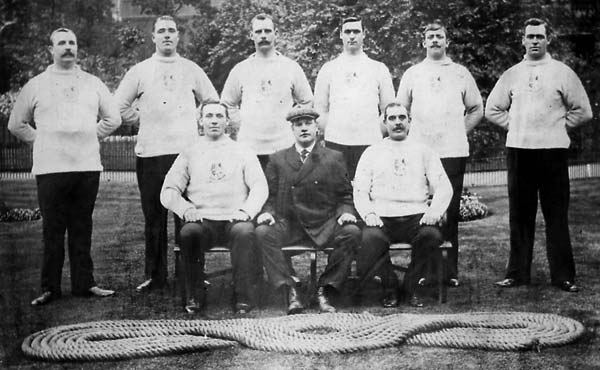
The 1908 City of London Police team that won the gold medal in 1908. (Back row – left to right): Frederick Merriman, John James Shepherd, Edwin Mills, Albert Ireton, Frederick Goodfellow, Frederick Humphreys (Front row – left to right): Edward Barrett, Henry Duke (Captain), William Hirons

Albert Ireton (15 May 1879 in Baldock – 4 January 1947) was a British tug of war competitor and boxer who competed in the 1908 Summer Olympics.

In 1908, he was part of the British team City of London Police, which won a gold medal in the tug of war competition. He also participated in the heavyweight boxing event but was eliminated in the first round.
