= George Canning (athlete) =

British tug of war competitor

Olympic medal record

Men's Tug of war
Gold medal – first place	1920 Antwerp	Team

George Walter Canning (23 August 1889 – 17 June 1955) was a British tug of war competitor who competed in the 1920 Summer Olympics. In 1920, he won the gold medal as a member of the British team. He was part of the City of London Police, which he worked for until 1935.
