= Mathias Hynes =

British tug of war competitor

Olympic medal record

Men's Tug of war
Silver medal – second place	1912 Stockholm	Team

Mathias Hynes (21 January 1883 – 9 March 1926) was a British tug of war competitor who competed in the 1912 Summer Olympics. In 1912, he won the silver medal as a member of the British team City of London Police, though he was Irish.
