= Edward Barrett (Irish sportsman) =

Irish sportsman (1877–1932)

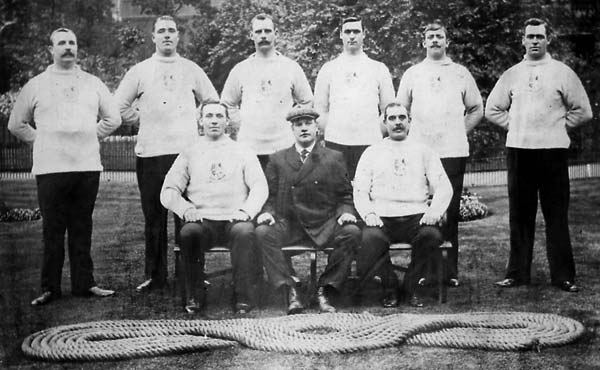
- The 1908 City of London Police team that won the gold medal in 1908. (Back row – left to right): Frederick Merriman, John James Shepherd, Edwin Mills, Albert Ireton, Frederick Goodfellow, Frederick Humphreys (Front row – left to right): Edward Barrett, Henry Duke (Captain), William Hirons

Personal information
- Born: 3 November 1877 Rahela, Ballyduff, County Kerry, Ireland
- Died: 19 March 1932 (aged 54) London, England
- Height: 185 cm (6 ft 1 in)
- Weight: 99 kg (218 lb)

Sport
- Club: City of London Police A.C
Medal record
Representing Great Britain
Olympic Games
Men's tug of war
Gold medal – first place	1908 London	Team competition
Men's freestyle wrestling
Bronze medal – third place	1908 London	Heavyweight

Edward Edmond Barrett (3 November 1877 – 19 March 1932) was an Irish athlete, wrestler and hurler, who won a gold medal at the 1908 Summer Olympics.

== Biography ==
He was born in Rahela, Ballyduff, County Kerry, Ireland. Barrett played hurling with the local Ballyduff team. He emigrated to London, joined a local hurling club, and was selected for the London GAA team. He was a corner-forward on the London team, which won the 1901 All-Ireland Championship, beating Cork GAA 1–5 to 0–4 in the final. It remains London's only senior All-Ireland hurling Championship title. Barrett also appeared for London in the final of the following year, but this time Cork gained revenge, thrashing London 3–13 to 0–0.

Barrett represented Great Britain at the 1908 Summer Olympics in London, where he won a gold medal as part of the City of London Police tug-of-war team. He also won a bronze medal in the heavyweight division of the freestyle wrestling competition.

Barrett also competed in the shot, javelin and discus competitions in the 1908 athletics programme, but wrestling was his premier sport. He was a British heavyweight freestyle champion at the British Wrestling Championships in 1908 and 1911. Barrett also competed in Greco-Roman wrestling in both 1908 and the Stockholm Olympics of 1912.

He resigned from the City of London Police force in July 1914.
