= Willem van Loon =

Dutch tug of war competitor

Olympic medal record

Men's Tug of war
| Silver medal – second place | 1920 Antwerp | Team |

Willem van Loon (15 August 1891 – 29 November 1975) was a Dutch tug of war competitor, who competed in the 1920 Summer Olympics. He was born in Arnhem and died in Arnhem. In 1920, Van Loon won the silver medal as a member of the Dutch tug-of-war team. He was the younger brother of Antonius van Loon.
