= Wilhelmus Bekkers =

Dutch tug of war competitor (1890–1957)

Olympic medal record

Men's tug of war

Representing the Netherlands
Silver medal – second place	1920 Antwerp	Team

Wilhelmus Johannes Bekkers (21 August 1890 – 13 November 1957) was a Dutch tug of war competitor, who competed in the 1920 Summer Olympics. He was born in Arnhem and died in Arnhem. Bekkers was a swimming teacher in his birthplace, where he married Engelina Gouw in 1916. In 1920, he won the silver medal as a member of the Dutch tug of war team.
