= John James Shepherd =

English tug of war competitor

Olympic medal record

Men's Tug of war
Gold medal – first place	1908 London	Team competition
Gold medal – first place	1920 Antwerp	Team competition
Silver medal – second place	1912 Stockholm	Team competition

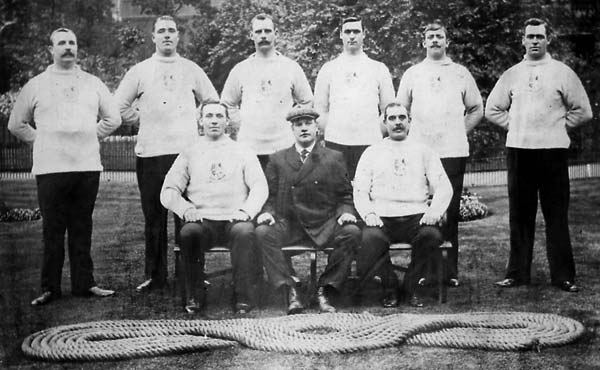
The 1908 City of London Police team that won the gold medal in 1908. (Back row - left to right): Frederick Merriman, John James Shepherd, Edwin Mills, Albert Ireton, Frederick Goodfellow, Frederick Humphreys (Front row - left to right): Edward Barrett, Henry Duke (Captain), William Hirons

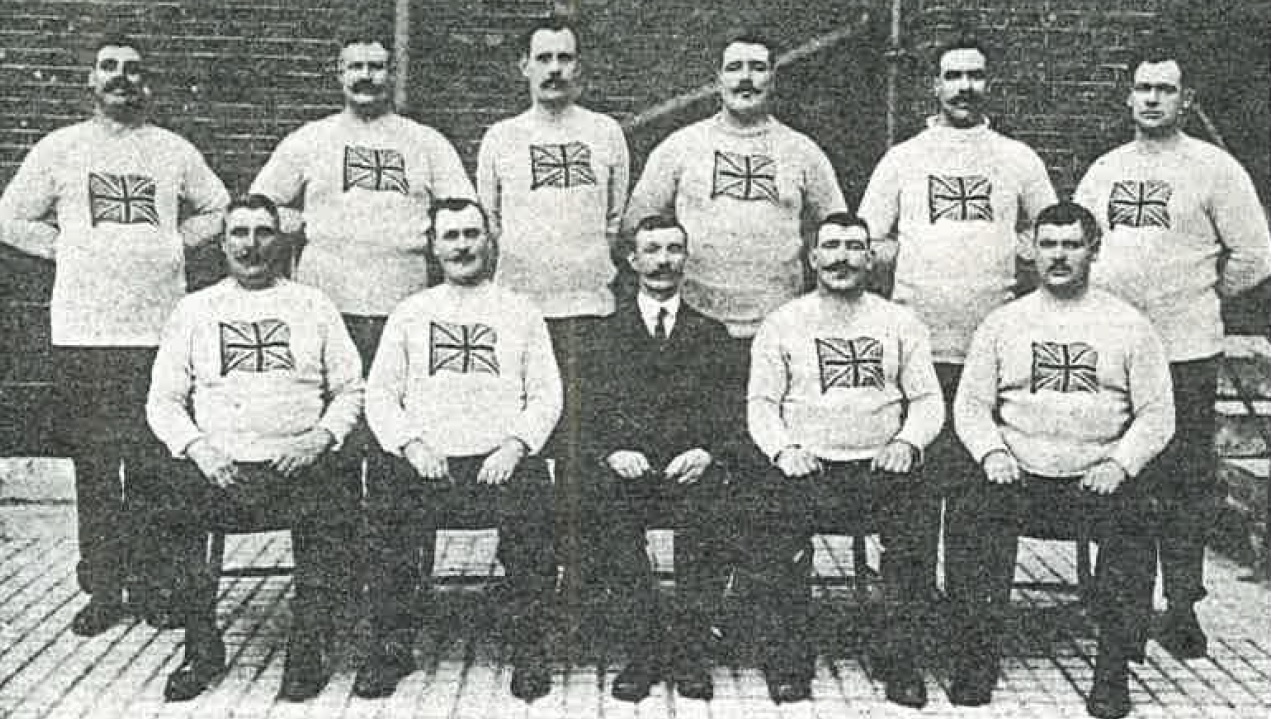
The 1912 silver medallist team from Great Britain (left to right; back row - Joseph Dowler*, Alexander Munro *, Edwin Mills, John James Shepherd, H. Stiff, Frederick Humphreys; front row - Walter Tammas *, Walter Chaffe*, Thomas Peel *, Matthias Hynes *, John Sewell; * = Metropolitan Police, all others City of London Police)

John James Shepherd (2 June 1884 – 9 July 1954) was an English tug of war competitor who competed in the 1908 Summer Olympics, in the 1912 Summer Olympics, and in the 1920 Summer Olympics for Great Britain.

He was part of the British team City of London Police, which won two gold medals in 1908 and 1920, and the joint City of London Police-Metropolitan Police "K" Division British team, which won a silver medal in 1912.

He was also known for supporting the wrestling styles of Cumberland and Westmorland and earned multiple heavyweight wrestling titles locally.
