= John Sewell (athlete) =

Scottish tug of war competitor

Olympic medal record

Men's Tug of war
Gold medal – first place	1920 Antwerp	Team
Silver medal – second place	1912 Stockholm	Team

John Sewell (23 April 1882, Half Morton, Dumfriesshire – 18 July 1947) was a Scottish tug of war competitor who competed for Great Britain and Ireland in the 1912 Summer Olympics and in the 1920 Summer Olympics.

In 1912, he won the silver medal as part of the joint Metropolitan Police and City of London Police team. Eight years later, he won the gold medal as part of the Great Britain team, this time wholly composed of City officers.
