= Walter Chaffe =

British tug of war competitor

Olympic medal record

Men's Tug of war
Silver medal – second place	1912 Stockholm	Team
Bronze medal – third place	1908 London	Team

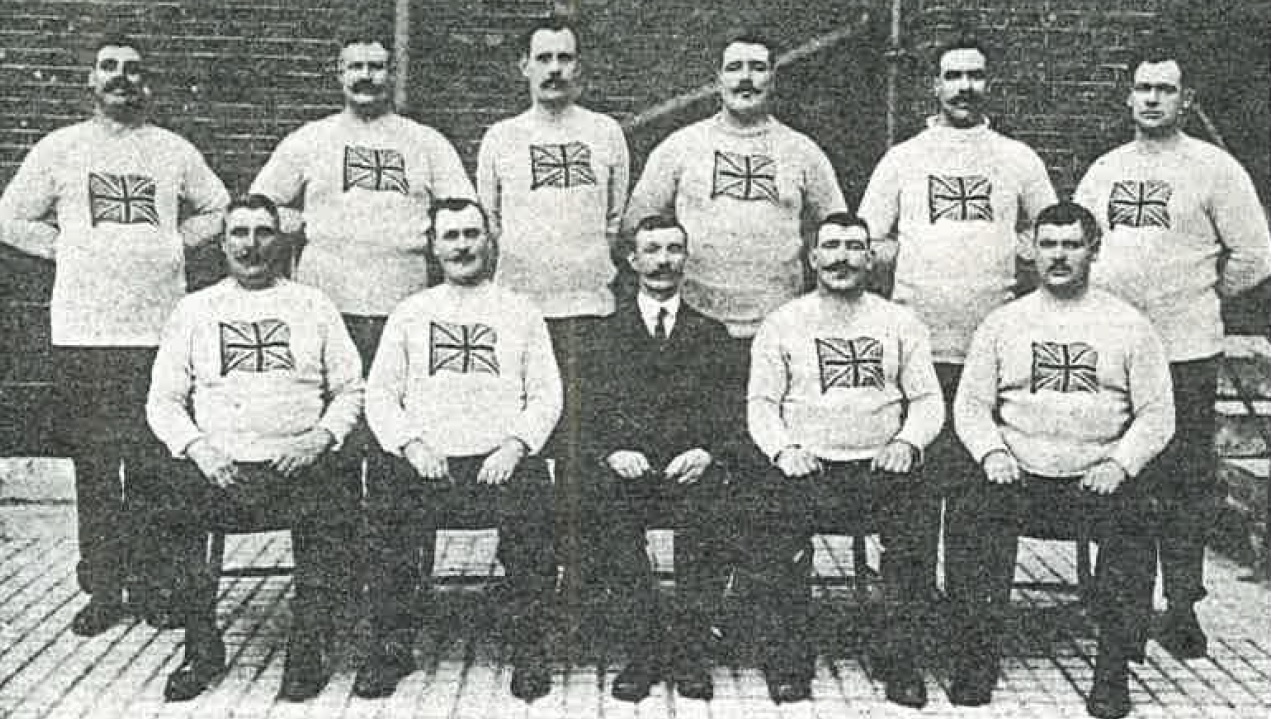
The 1912 silver medallist team from Great Britain (left to right; back row – Joseph Dowler*, Alexander Munro *, Edwin Mills, John James Shepherd, H. Stiff, Frederick Humphreys; front row – Walter Tammas *, Walter Chaffe*, Thomas Peel *, Matthias Hynes *, John Sewell; * = Metropolitan Police, all others City of London Police)

Walter Chaffe (2 April 1870 – 22 April 1918) was a British tug of war competitor who competed in the 1908 Summer Olympics and in the 1912 Summer Olympics.

In 1908, he won the bronze medal as a member of the British team Metropolitan Police "K" Division. Four years later, he won the silver medal as a member of the joint City of London Police-Metropolitan Police "K" Division British team.
