= Christin Piek =

Belgian tug of war competitor

Olympic medal record

Men's Tug of war
Bronze medal – third place	1920 Antwerp	Team

Christin Albert Henri Piek (born 23 January 1889, date of death unknown) was a Belgian tug of war competitor who competed in the 1920 Summer Olympics. In 1920, he won the bronze medal as a member of the Belgian tug of war team.
