= Sijtse Jansma =

Dutch tug of war competitor

Olympic medal record

Men's Tug of war
Silver medal – second place	1920 Antwerp	Team

Sijtse Jansma (22 May 1898 – 4 December 1977) was a Dutch tug of war competitor who competed in the 1920 Summer Olympics. In 1920, he won the silver medal as a member of the Dutch tug of war team.
