= Ernest Thorne =

English tug of war competitor

Olympic medal record

Men's Tug of war
| Gold medal – first place | 1920 Antwerp | Team |

Ernest Arthur Thorne (7 June 1887 – 18 November 1968) was an English tug of war competitor who competed in the 1920 Summer Olympics representing Great Britain. In 1920, he won the gold medal as a member of the British team, which was wholly composed of City of London Police officers.
