= Henk Janssen =

Dutch tug of war competitor

Olympic medal record

Men's Tug of war
Silver medal – second place	1920 Antwerp	Team

Hendrikus Alexander ("Henk") Janssen (17 June 1890 – 28 August 1969) was a Dutch tug of war competitor who competed in the 1920 Summer Olympics. He was born in Arnhem and died in Arnhem. In 1920, Janssen won the silver medal as a member of the Dutch tug of war team.
