= Tug of war at the 1912 Summer Olympics =

Tug of war at the Olympics

Men's tug of war at the Games of the V Olympiad
- Venue: Stockholm Olympic Stadium
- Date: July 8, 1912
- Competitors: 16 from 2 nations

The tug of war contest at the 1912 Summer Olympics consisted of a single match, as only two teams entered the competition.

Sweden was represented by the Stockholm Police, while Great Britain's team consisted of five men from City of London Police and five from "K" (Stepney) Division of the Metropolitan Police, the gold and bronze medallists respectively at the last Summer Olympics. Austria, Bohemia, and Luxembourg had all entered teams, but failed to appear.

The withdrawals of those three teams turned what had been planned as a 10-match round-robin tournament into a single-match bout between Sweden and Great Britain. The bout consisted of a best-two-of-three contest. The competition was held on July 8, 1912. In the first pull, the Swedish team steadily pulled the British squad across the center mark. After a five-minute break, the second pull was started. In this one, neither team gained the victory through pulling the other across the line, but after a prolonged stalemate a couple of the London men succumbed to exhaustion and sat on the ground, disqualifying them and giving the Swedes the victory.

== Medal summary ==
Event	Gold	Silver	Bronze
Men's tug of war	Sweden; Arvid Andersson; Adolf Bergman; Johan Edman; Erik Algot Fredriksson; Carl Jonsson; Erik Larsson; August Gustafsson; Herbert Lindström	Great Britain; Alexander Munro (Met); John Sewell (City); John James Shepherd (City); Joseph Dowler (Met); Edwin Mills (City); Frederick Humphreys (City); Mathias Hynes (Met); Walter Chaffe (Met; captain and trainer)	No further competitors

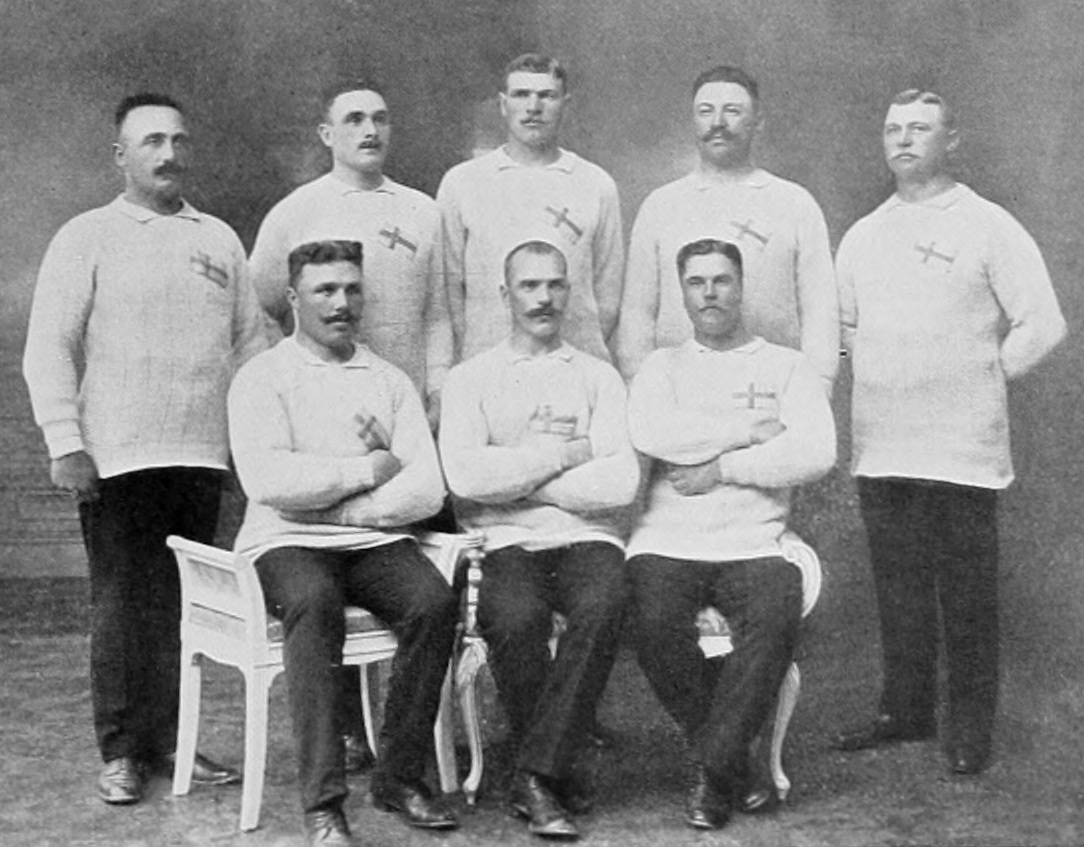
The winning team of Sweden.

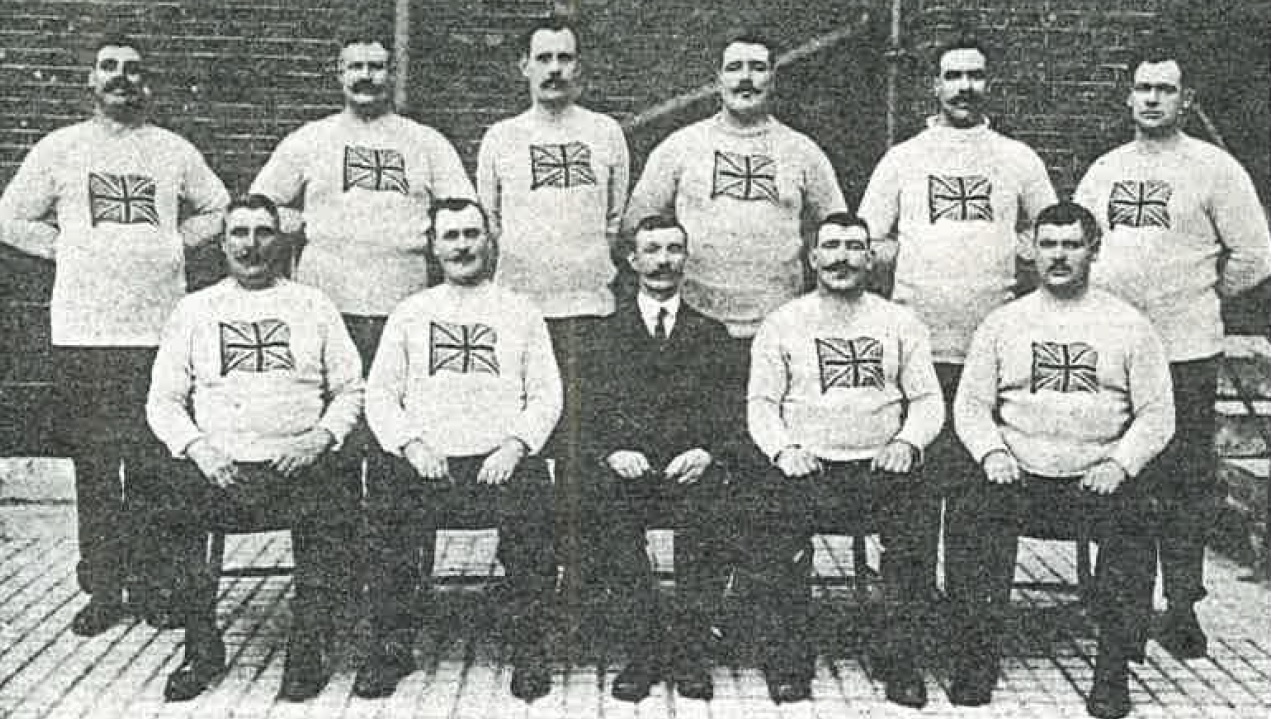
The losing team from Great Britain (left to right; back row - Dowler, Munro, Mills, Shepherd, H. Stiff (City - did not compete), Humphreys; front row - Walter Tammas (Met - did not compete), Chaffe, Thomas Peel (Met - did not compete), Hynes, Sewell

== Sources ==
- Bergvall, Erik (ed.) (1913). Adams-Ray, Edward (trans.). (ed.). The Official Report of the Olympic Games of Stockholm 1912. Stockholm: Wahlström & Widstrand.
- Wudarski, Pawel (1999). "Wyniki Igrzysk Olimpijskich" (in Polish).
