= Edwin Mills (athlete) =

British tug of war competitor

Olympic medal record

Men's Tug of war
| Gold medal – first place | 1908 London | Team |
| Gold medal – first place | 1920 Antwerp | Team |
| Silver medal – second place | 1912 Stockholm | Team |

Edwin Archer Mills (17 May 1878 – 12 November 1946) was a British tug of war competitor who competed in the 1908 Summer Olympics, in the 1912 Summer Olympics, and in the 1920 Summer Olympics.

He was part of the British team City of London Police, which won two gold medals in 1908 and 1920, and the joint City of London Police-Metropolitan Police "K" Division British team, which won a silver medal in 1912.

He also competed in the heavyweight division of both the Greco-Roman and Freestyle wrestling competitions at the 1908 Olympic Games.

== Gallery ==
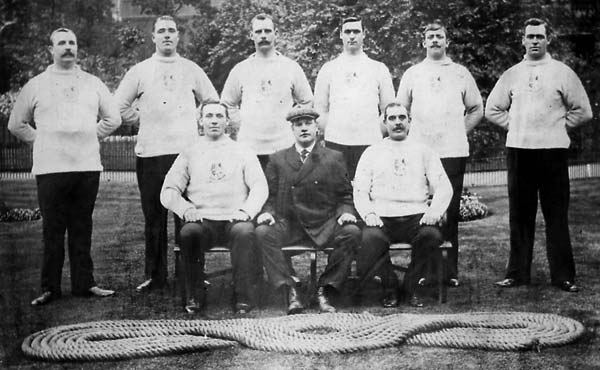
The City of London Police tug of war team that won the gold medal at the Olympic Games in 1908.
(Back row - left to right): Frederick Merriman, John James Shepherd, Edwin Mills, Albert Ireton, Frederick Goodfellow, Frederick Humphreys
(Front row - left to right): Edward Barrett, Henry Duke (Note: Captain), William Hirons

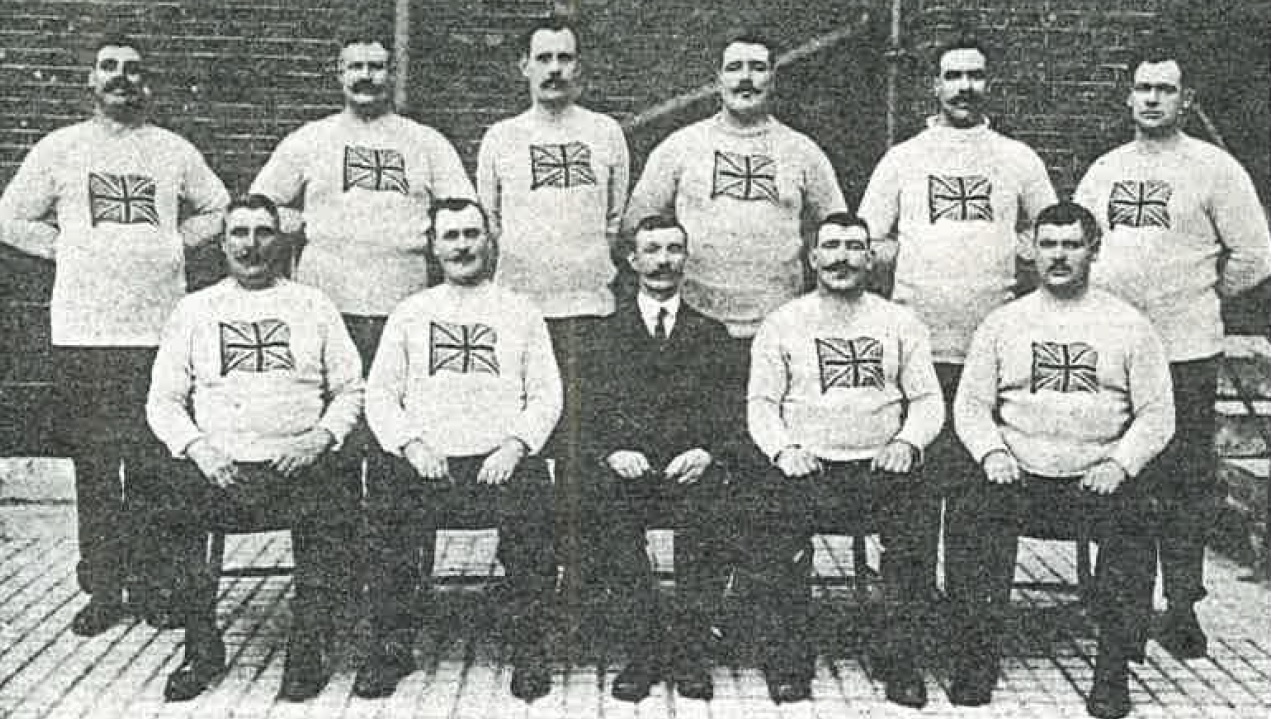
The combined Metropolitan and City of London Police tug of war team that won the silver medal at the Olympic Games in 1912.
(back row - left to right) Joseph Dowler*, Alexander Munro *, Edwin Mills, John James Shepherd, H. Stiff, Frederick Humphreys;
(front row - left to right) Walter Tammas *, Walter Chaffe (Note: Captain and Trainer)*, Thomas Peel *, Matthias Hynes *, John Sewell.
* = Metropolitan Police; all others City of London Police
