= Harry Stiff =

English tug of war competitor

Olympic medal record

Men's Tug of war
Gold medal – first place	1920 Antwerp	Team

Harold "Harry" Joseph Stiff (23 October 1881 – 17 April 1939) was an English tug of war competitor who debuted at the age of 38 in the 1920 Summer Olympics, and won the gold medal representing Great Britain, as part of the City of London Police. He later became a landowner of the Horse and Groom Public House, Cornish Hall End, close to Finchingfield, Essex.
