= Gustave Wuyts =

Belgian tug of war competitor and shot putter

Olympic medal record

Men's Tug of war
Bronze medal – third place	1920 Antwerp	Team

Gustave Marius Wuyts (27 February 1903 – 13 January 1979) was a Belgian tug of war competitor and shot putter. He competed in the 1920 Summer Olympics. In 1920, he won the bronze medal as a member of the Belgian tug of war team.
