= Johannes Hengeveld =

Dutch tug of war competitor

Olympic medal record

Men's Tug of war
Silver medal – second place	1920 Antwerp	Team

Johannes Hendrikus Hengeveld (December 24, 1894 – May 4, 1961) was a Dutch tug of war competitor, who competed in the 1920 Summer Olympics. He was born in Arnhem, Netherlands, and died there as well.

In 1920, Hengeveld won the silver medal as a member of the Dutch tug of war team.
