= Alexander Munro (athlete) =

British wrestler (1870–1934)

Olympic medal record

Men's Tug of war
Silver medal – second place	1912 Stockholm	Team
Bronze medal – third place	1908 London	Team

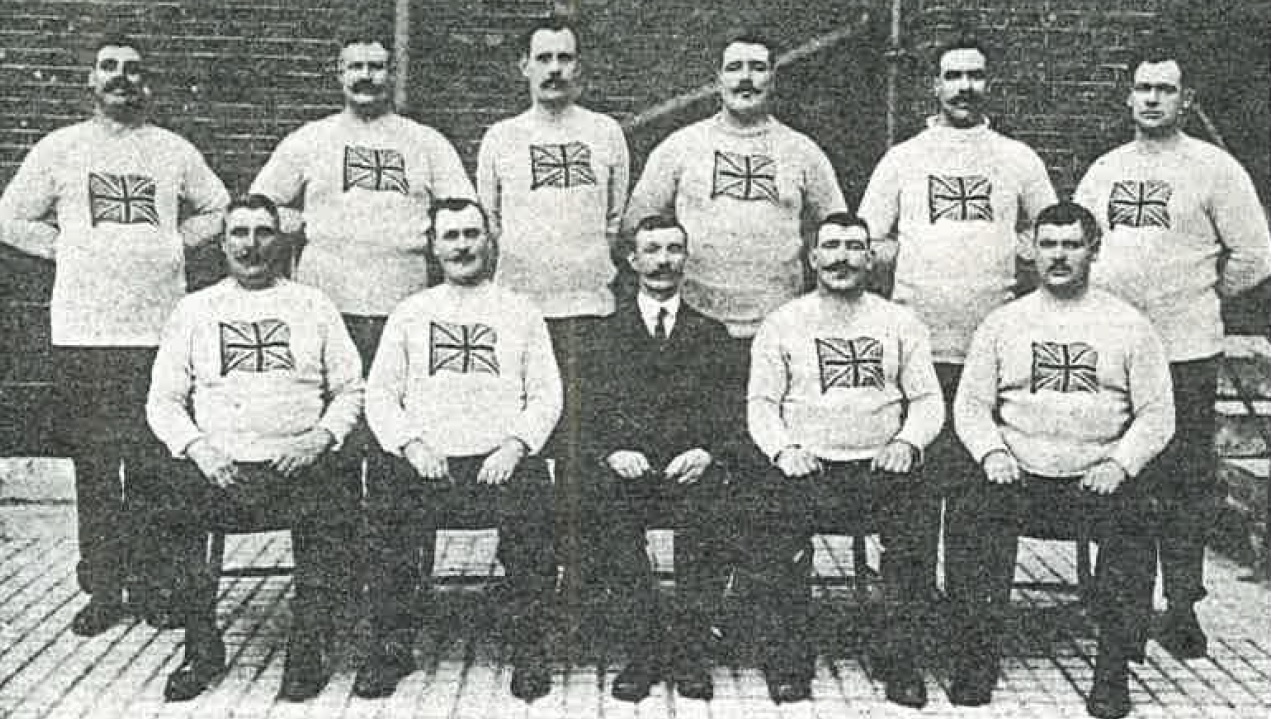
The 1912 silver medallist team from Great Britain (left to right; back row - Joseph Dowler*, Alexander Munro *, Edwin Mills, John James Shepherd, H. Stiff, Frederick Humphreys; front row - Walter Tammas *, Walter Chaffe*, Thomas Peel *, Matthias Hynes *, John Sewell; * = Metropolitan Police, all others City of London Police)

Alexander Munro (30 November 1870 – 3 January 1934) was a British strongman, wrestler, and tug of war competitor who competed in the latter sport in the 1908 Summer Olympics and in the 1912 Summer Olympics.

In 1908, he won the bronze medal as a member of the British team Metropolitan Police "K" Division. Four years later, he won the silver medal as a member of the joint City of London Police-Metropolitan Police "K" Division British team. In 1908, Munro was also the Scottish wrestling champion but lost a noted match to Georg Hackenschmidt.
