= Charlton Brosius =

United States Army officer

Charlton Lee Brosius (July 18, 1876 – September 28, 1956) was an American Army officer, competitor in the 1920 Summer Olympics in tug of war, and nationally renowned physical trainer.

== Biography ==
Brosius was born in Milwaukee, Wisconsin on July 18, 1876. His father, George, served in the 35th Wisconsin Infantry Regiment during the Civil War and became a prominent physical trainer in the Milwaukee area.

=== National Guard ===
Brosius enlisted into Company F of the 4th Wisconsin Infantry Regiment (National Guard) in April 1896 and volunteered for service in the Spanish–American War in 1898. Brosius served in Company M of the 1st Wisconsin Infantry Regiment during the War, and was honorably discharged in August 1900. In July 1913, he re-enlisted into Company D of the 1st Wisconsin Infantry Regiment; he was transferred to Company F in April 1915 and was promoted to 2nd Lieutenant two months later. Brosius was mustered into service for the Mexican Border War in June 1916, where he commanded an infantry regiment. Having earned a sterling reputation as a physical trainer, Brosius remained stateside during World War I, going from camp to camp to implement training programs for American soldiers.

=== Olympic team and later life ===
After the war, Brosius participated in the VII Olympiad, which took place in Antwerp, Belgium in 1920. He was an alternate on the United States fencing team and the captain of the tug of war team; Brosius led his team to a fourth-place finish in the latter. Following the Olympics, Brosius worked as a physical trainer at St. John's Northwestern Military Academy in Delafield, Wisconsin. He also served as director of Brosius Gymnasium, Inc. in Milwaukee during the 1930s, following in the footsteps of his father. In 1936 Brosius became adjutant at the Grand Army Home in King, Wisconsin. During World War II, he took over the role of Commandant, but returned to the adjutant position in 1945. Two years later, Brosius retired, but remained at the Grand Army Home. Brosius helped found a museum at King, which was dedicated as the "Carl L. Brosius Memorial Museum" in March 1955. He died at the Grand Army Home on 28 September 1955.
