= Frederick Goodfellow =

British tug of war competitor (1874–1960)

Olympic medal record

Men's Tug of war
Gold medal – first place	1908 London	Team competition

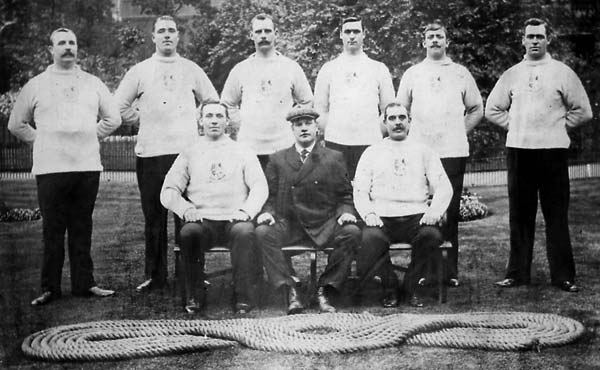
The 1908 City of London Police team that won the gold medal in 1908. (Back row - left to right): Frederick Merriman, John James Shepherd, Edwin Mills, Albert Ireton, Frederick Goodfellow, Frederick Humphreys (Front row - left to right): Edward Barrett, Henry Duke (Captain), William Hirons

Frederick William Goodfellow (July 1874 – 22 November 1960) was a British tug of war competitor who competed in the 1908 Summer Olympics. He was part of the British team, which won the gold medal in the tug of war competition.
