= Antonius van Loon =

Dutch tug of war competitor

Olympic medal record

Men's Tug of war
Silver medal – second place	1920 Antwerp	Team

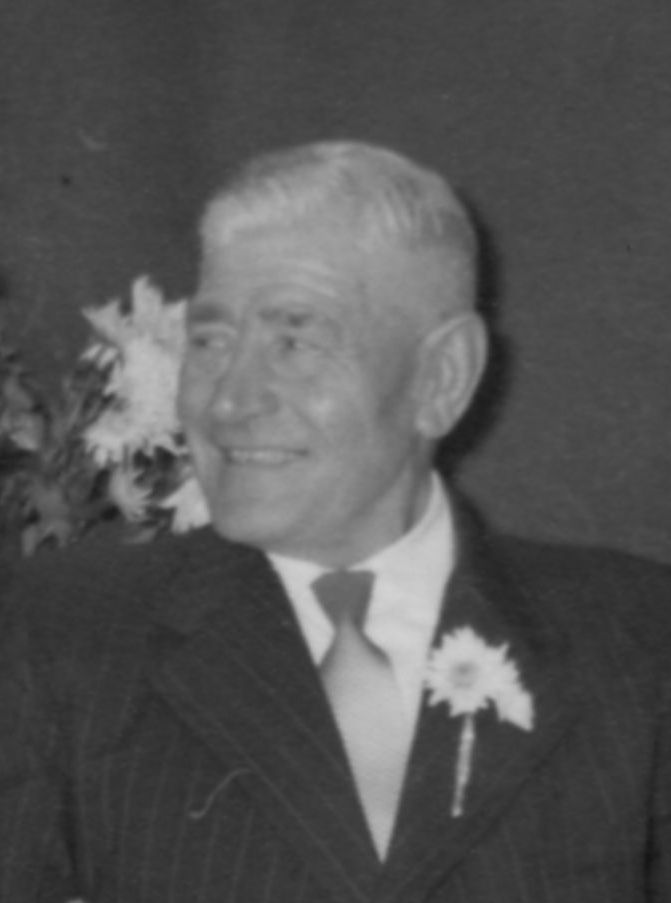
Anton van Loon

Antonius van Loon (25 June 1888 – 3 November 1962) was a Dutch tug of war competitor, who competed in the 1920 Summer Olympics. He was born in Arnhem and died in Arnhem. In 1920, Van Loon won the silver medal as a member of the Dutch tug-of-war team. He was the older brother of Willem van Loon.
