= Henry Duke (police officer) =

British tug of war competitor

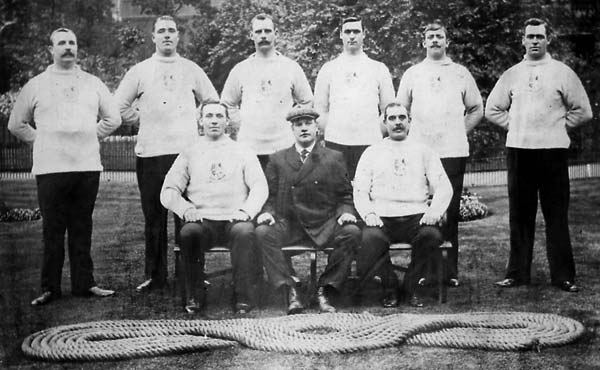
The 1908 City of London Police team that won the gold medal in 1908. (Back row - left to right): Frederick Merriman, John James Shepherd, Edwin Mills, Albert Ireton, Frederick Goodfellow, Frederick Humphreys (Front row - left to right): Edward Barrett, Henry Duke (Captain), William Hirons

John Henry Duke (born 1867) was a chief inspector of the City of London Police and an athlete. He was honorary secretary of the City of London Police Athletic Club and captained the team that won the tug of war competition at the 1908 Summer Olympics.
