= Marinus van Rekum =

Dutch tug of war competitor

Olympic medal record

Men's Tug of war
Silver medal – second place	1920 Antwerp	Team

Marinus Cornelis van Rekum (7 February 1884 – 16 November 1955) was a Dutch tug of war competitor who competed in the 1920 Summer Olympics. He was born in Arnhem and died in Arnhem. In 1920, he won the silver medal as a member of the Dutch tug-of-war team. He was the older brother of Willem van Rekum.
