= William Hirons =

British tug of war competitor

Olympic medal record

Men's Tug of war
Gold medal – first place	1908 London	Team competition

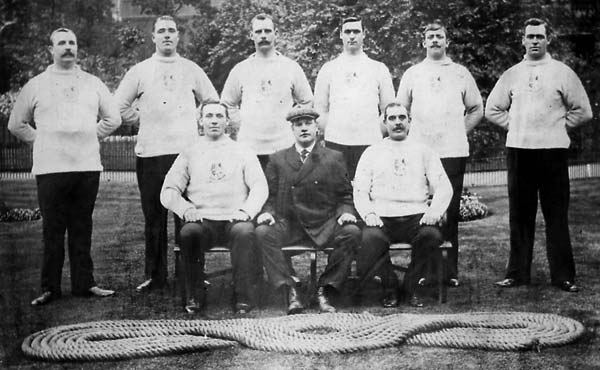
The 1908 City of London Police team that won the gold medal in 1908. (Back row - left to right): Frederick Merriman, John James Shepherd, Edwin Mills, Albert Ireton, Frederick Goodfellow, Frederick Humphreys (Front row - left to right): Edward Barrett, H. Duke (Captain), William Hirons

William Hirons (15 June 1871 – 5 January 1958) was a British tug of war competitor who competed as part of the City of London Police team, in the 1908 Summer Olympics. He was part of the British team that won the gold medal in the tug of war competition.
