= Frederick Holmes (athlete) =

British tug of war competitor

Olympic medal record

Men's Tug of war
Gold medal – first place	1920 Antwerp	Team

Frederick William Holmes (9 August 1886 – 9 November 1944) was a British tug of war competitor who competed in the 1920 Summer Olympics. In 1920, he won the gold medal as a member of the British team, which was entirely composed of City of London Police officers.
