= Willem van Rekum =

Dutch tug of war competitor

Olympic medal record

Men's Tug of war
Silver medal – second place	1920 Antwerp	Team

Willem Cornelis van Rekum (9 June 1892 – 27 December 1961) was a Dutch tug of war competitor who competed in the 1920 Summer Olympics. He was born in Arnhem and died in Arnhem. In 1920, he won the silver medal as a member of the Dutch tug of war team. He was the younger brother of Marinus van Rekum.
