= Frederick Humphreys (athlete) =

British tug-of-war competitor (1878–1954)

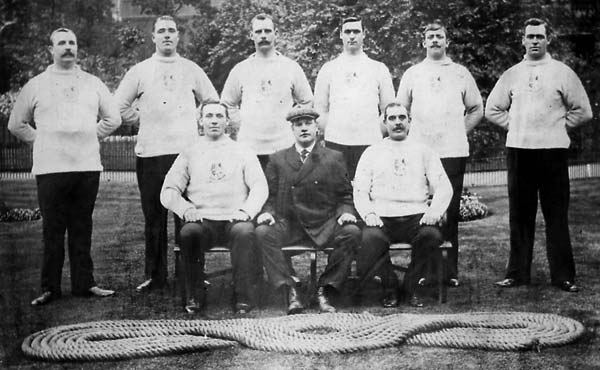
- The 1908 City of London Police team that won the gold medal in 1908. (Back row – left to right): Frederick Merriman, John James Shepherd, Edwin Mills, Albert Ireton, Frederick Goodfellow, Frederick Humphreys (Front row – left to right): Edward Barrett, Henry Duke (Captain), William Hirons
- Born: 28 January 1878; Highbury, London, England
- Died: 10 August 1954 (aged 76); Ealing, London, England
- Occupation: Police Constable
- Known for: Olympic Gold Medalist – Tug-of-War

Olympic medal record

Men's Tug of war
Gold medal – first place	1908 London	Team
Gold medal – first place	1920 Antwerp	Team
Silver medal – second place	1912 Stockholm	Team

Frederick Harkness Humphreys (28 January 1878 – 10 August 1954) was a British tug of war competitor and sport wrestler who competed in the 1908 Summer Olympics in London, in the 1912 Summer Olympics in Stockholm, and in the 1920 Summer Olympics in Antwerp. He was also a constable in the City of London Police, collar number 970, as were two of his brothers.

He was part of the British team City of London Police, which won two gold medals in 1908 and 1920, and the joint City of London Police-Metropolitan Police "K" Division British team, which won a silver medal in 1912. There were no games in 1916 due to World War I.

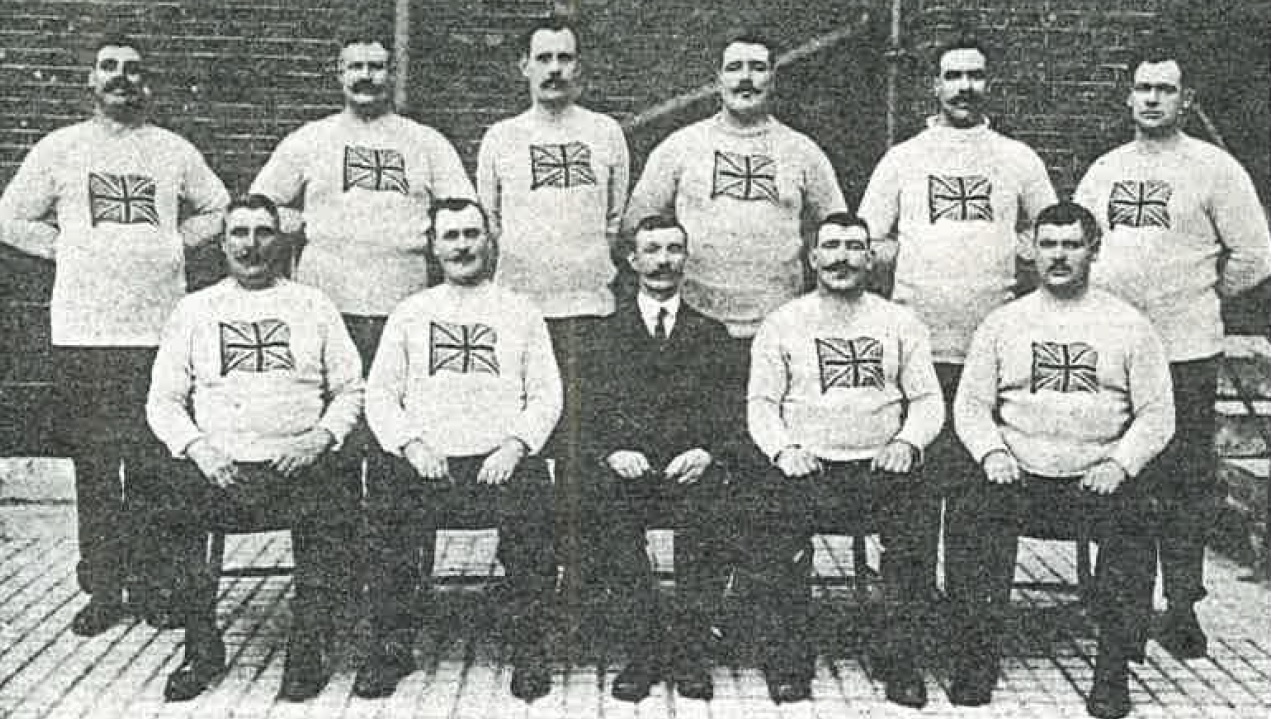
The 1912 silver medallist team from Great Britain (left to right; back row – Joseph Dowler*, Alexander Munro *, Edwin Mills, John James Shepherd, H. Stiff, Frederick Humphreys; front row – Walter Tammas *, Walter Chaffe*, Thomas Peel *, Matthias Hynes *, John Sewell; * = Metropolitan Police, all others City of London Police)

He also competed in wrestling and took part in demonstration bouts around Europe and the United Kingdom. In the 1908 Olympic Greco-Roman super heavyweight competition he was eliminated in the first round and in the freestyle heavyweight event he was eliminated in the quarter-finals.

In May 2013, some of his medals, including the 1912 silver and 1920 gold, as well as family photographs, were shown on an episode of a BBC television programme by two of his great-nieces. They stated that the whereabouts of his 1908 gold medal are unknown.
