= Laura Brosius =

German football defender

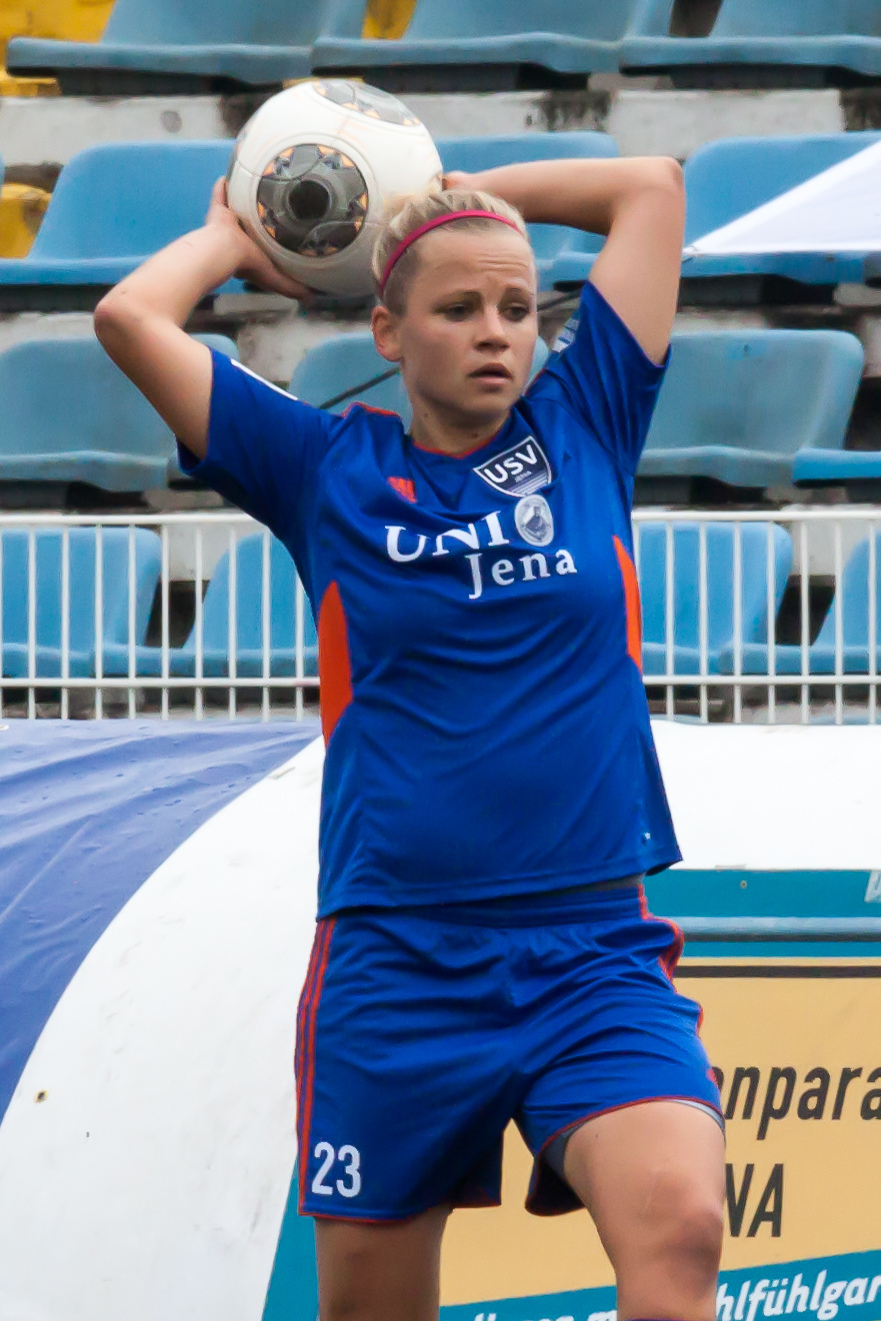

Personal information
- Full name: Laura Brosius
- Date of birth: January 8, 1990 (age 36)
- Place of birth: Berlin, Germany
- Position: Defender

Team information
- Current team: FF USV Jena
- Number: 23

Youth career
- –2002: SG Bornim
- 2002–2006: 1. FFC Turbine Potsdam

Senior career*
Years	Team	Apps	(Gls)
2006–2010	1.FFC Turbine Potsdam	11	(0)
2006–2010	1.FFC Turbine Potsdam II	54	(2)
2010–	FF USV Jena	22	(0)

International career^{‡}
	Germany U19	14	(0)
	Germany U20	4	(0)
- * Club domestic league appearances and goals ‡ National team caps and goals as of 14 November 2007

Laura Brosius (born 8 January 1990 in Berlin) is a German football defender. She currently plays for FF USV Jena.

== Football career ==
Brosius began her career at SG Bornim. She joined the academy of 1. FFC Turbine Potsdam in 2002. In 2005 and 2006, she won the German girls championship. She then joined the reserve team and played in the second division. Only in the 2007–08 season she acquired 11 caps for the first team. In June 2010 she announced her transfer to FF USV Jena.

== Running career ==
Outside of football, Brosius has participated in endurance running events.
