= Tug of war at the 1920 Summer Olympics =

Men's tug of war at the Games of the VII Olympiad
- Venue: Olympisch Stadion
- Dates: August 17–18, 1920
- Competitors: 40 from 5 nations

Medalists
| 1st place, gold medalist(s) | | Great Britain |
| 2nd place, silver medalist(s) | | Netherlands |
| 3rd place, bronze medalist(s) | | Belgium |

The tug of war contest at the 1920 Summer Olympics was held on August 17, 1920, and on August 18, 1920. All medals were decided by using the Bergvall system.

This was the last time the tug of war was in the Olympic program. The British team entirely consisted of City of London Police officers and so the gold medal is still at that force's museum.

== Medal summary ==
| Gold | Silver | Bronze |
|---|---|---|
| Great Britain; George Canning; Frederick Humphreys; Frederick Holmes; Edwin Mills; John Sewell; John James Shepherd; Harry Stiff; Ernest Thorn | Netherlands; Wilhelmus Bekkers; Johannes Hengeveld; Sijtse Jansma; Henk Janssen; Antonius van Loon; Willem van Loon; Marinus van Rekum; Willem van Rekum | Belgium; Édouard Bourguignon; Alphonse Ducatillon; Rémy Maertens; Christin Piek; Henri Pintens; Charles Van den Broeck; François Van Hoorenbeek; Gustave Wuyts |

== Participating nations ==
A total of 40(*) tug of war competitors from 5 nations competed at the Antwerp Games:

- Belgium (8)
- Great Britain (8)
- Italy (8)
- Netherlands (8)
- United States (8)

(*) NOTE: Only competitors who participated in at least one pull are counted.

Two Italian reserves are known.

== Results ==
| Place | Nation |
|---|---|
| 1 | Great Britain |
| 2 | Netherlands |
| 3 | Belgium |
| 4 | United States Charlton Brosius; Stephen Fields; Sylvester Granrose; Lloyd Kelsey; Joseph Kszyczewiski; William Penn; Joseph Rond; Joseph Winston |
| 5 | Italy Adriano Arnoldo; Silvio Calzolari; Romolo Carpi; Giovanni Forni; Rodolfo Rambozzi; Carlo Schiappapietra; Giuseppe Tonani; Amedeo Zotti Cesare Cogliolo; Pietro Scasso |

=== Gold medal round ===
Quarterfinals
Great Britain | 2
United States | 0

Semifinals
Great Britain | 2
Belgium | 0
Netherlands | 2
Italy | 0

Final
Great Britain | 2
Netherlands | 0

=== Silver medal round ===
| Semifinals | | Final |
| Belgium | 2 |
| United States | 0 | Belgium | 0 |
| | | Netherlands | 2 |

=== Bronze medal round ===
| Semifinals | | Final |
| United States | 2 |
| Italy | 0 | United States | 0 |
| | | Belgium | 2 |
