= George Brosius =

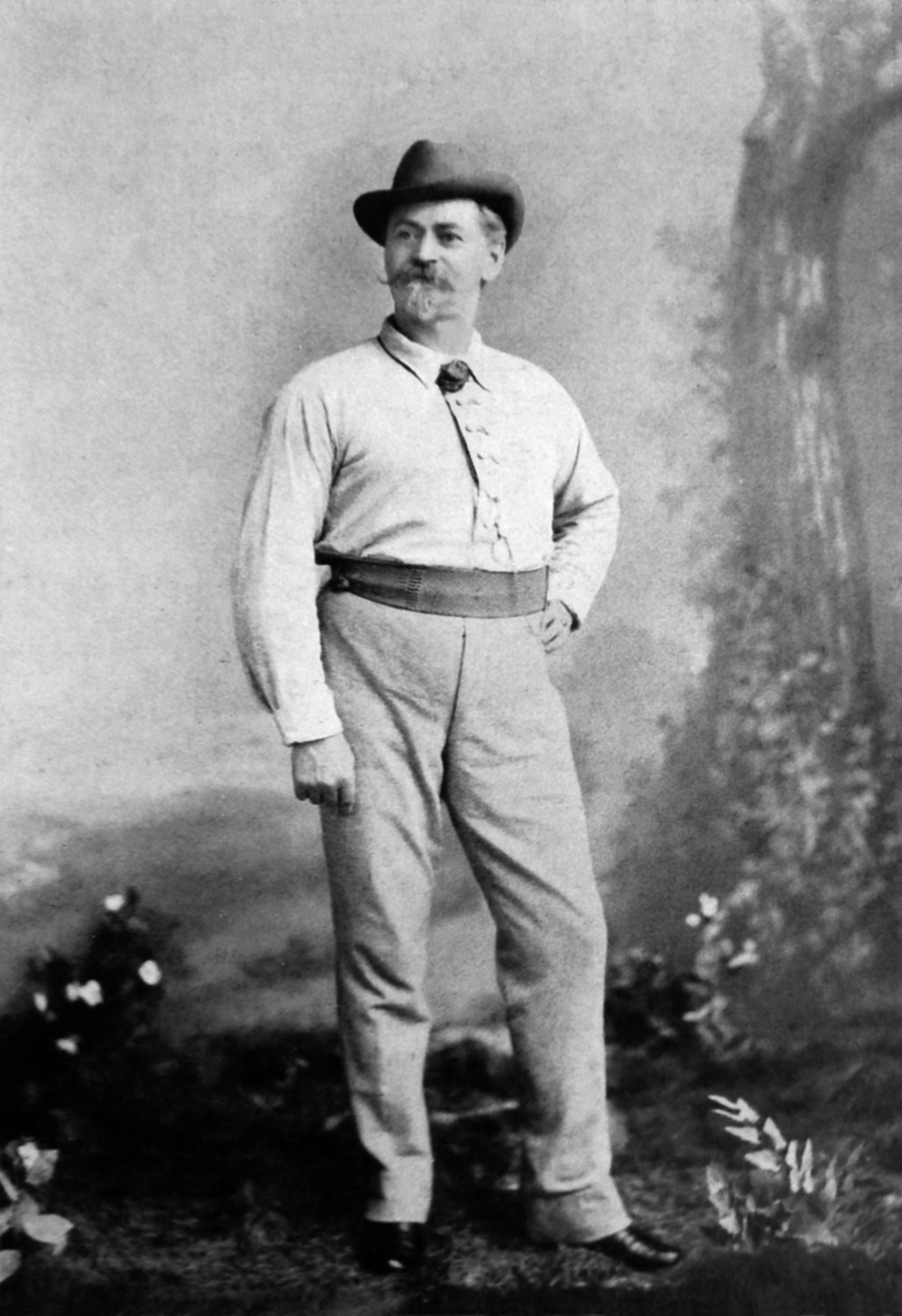
George Brosius 1890

George Brosius (September 9, 1839 – March 17, 1920) was a German-American gymnastics teacher and prominent member of the Milwaukee Turners associated from 1854 to 1915 with the Milwaukee Turnverein. He served in the Union Army from 1861 to 1864. He introduced physical education to the Milwaukee public schools in 1875 and supervised it until 1883. His crowning achievement was leading seven members of the Milwaukee Turnverein to the international gymnastics tournament in Frankfurt am Main in 1880, where they won the 2nd, 3rd, 5th, 13th, and 21st individual prizes. He served as director of the American Gymnastic Union's Normal College of Physical Education in Milwaukee from 1875 to 1899.

== Gallery ==
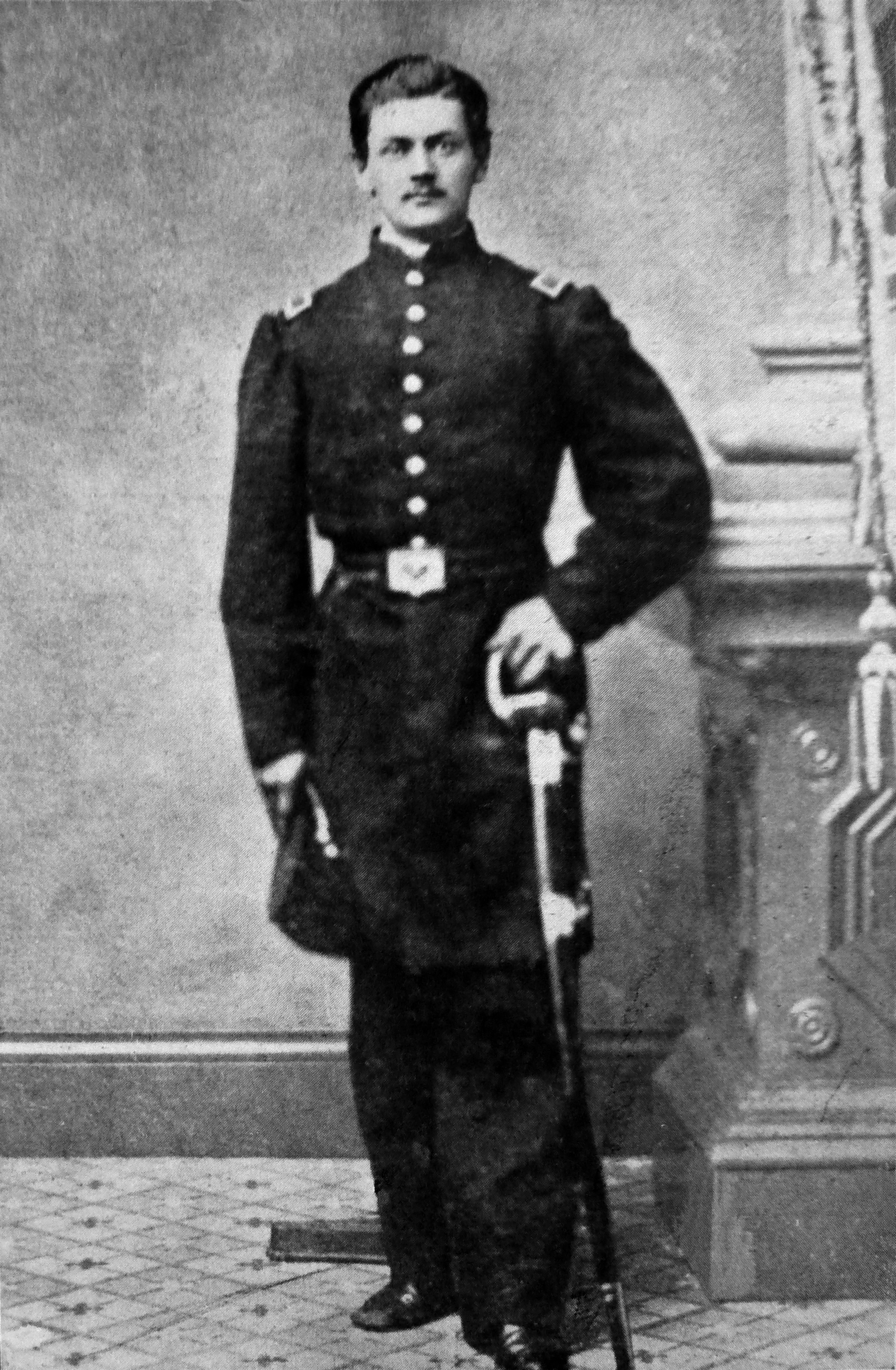
Lieutenant George Brosius, 1863

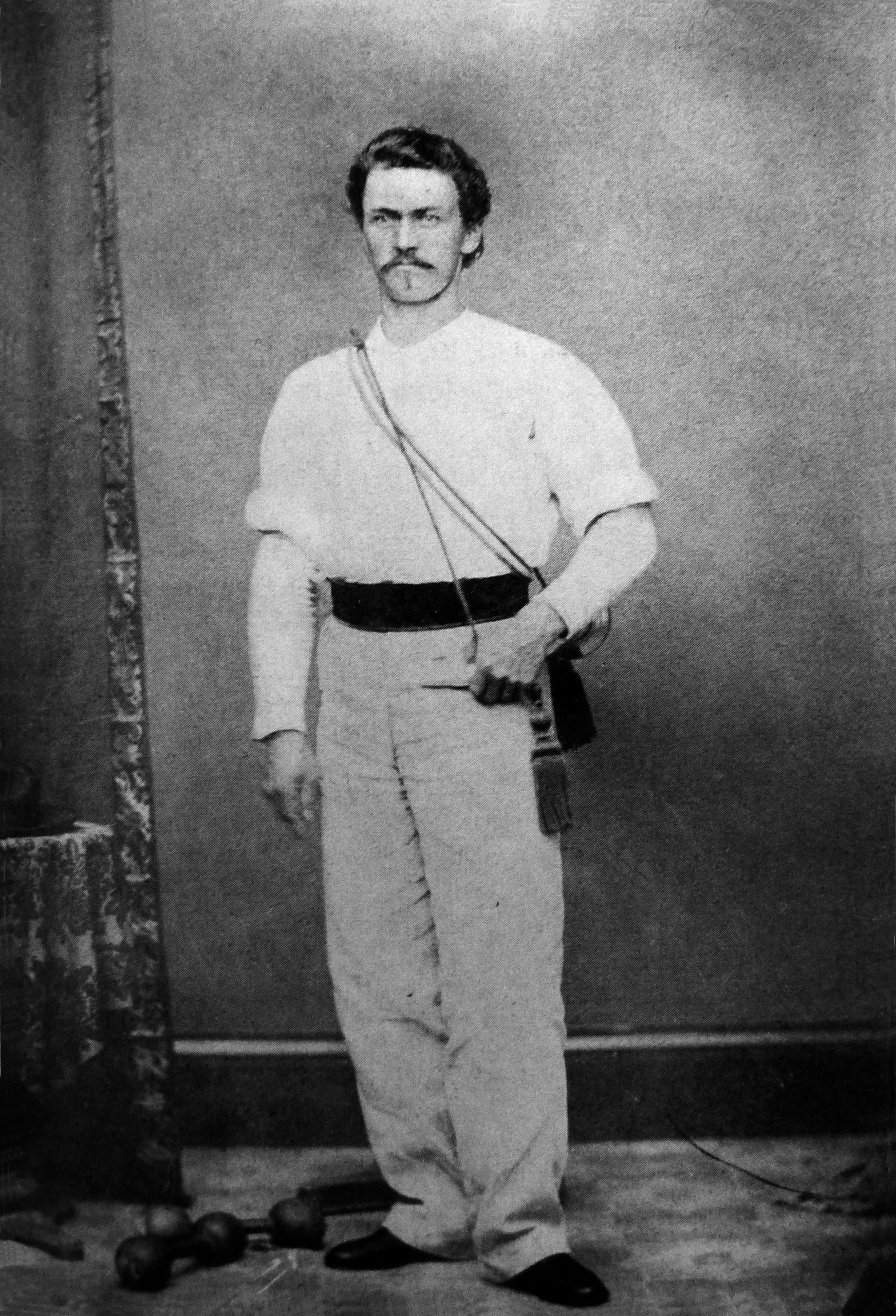
Brosius as a gymnast, 1865

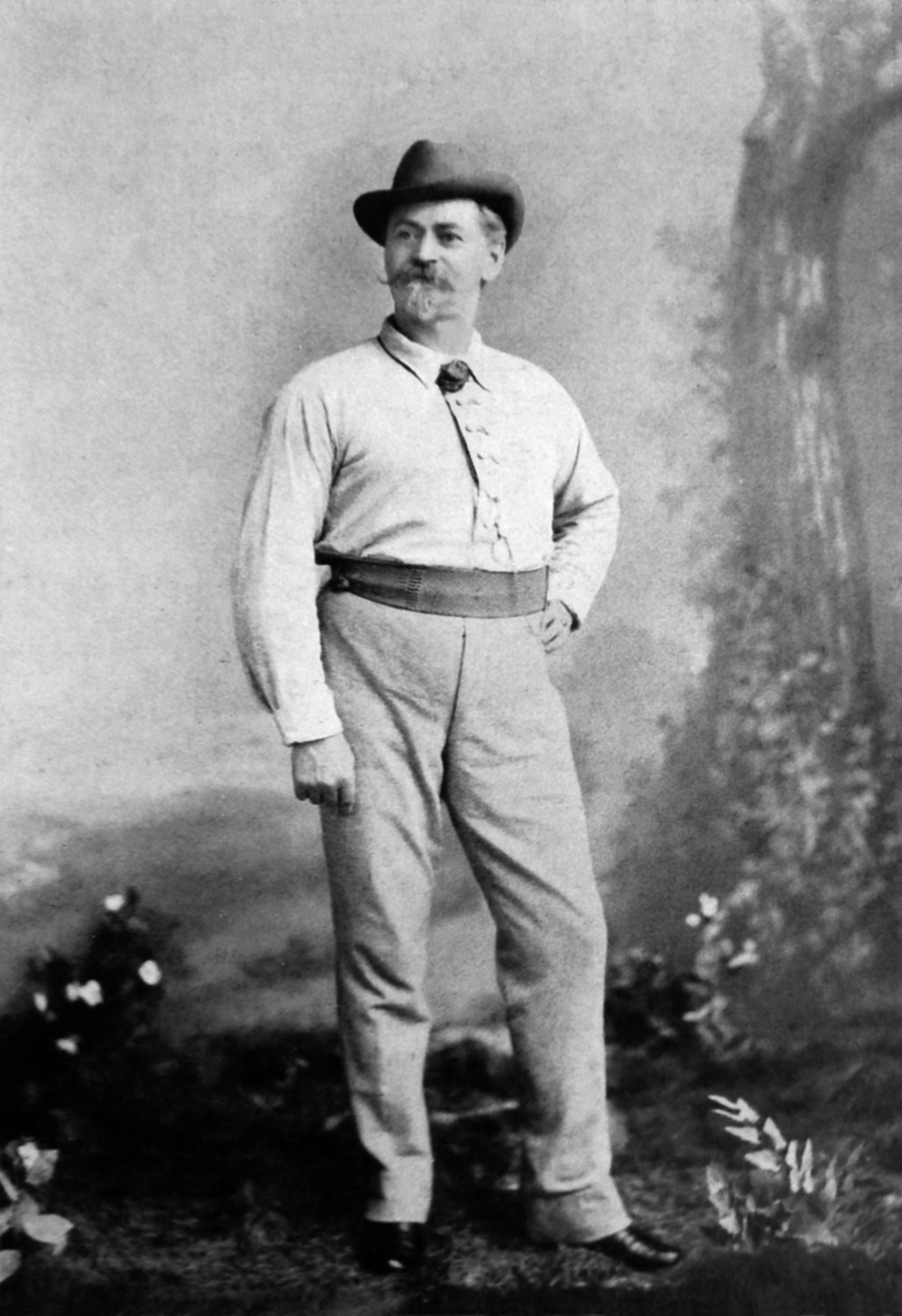
Brosius as a teacher, 1890

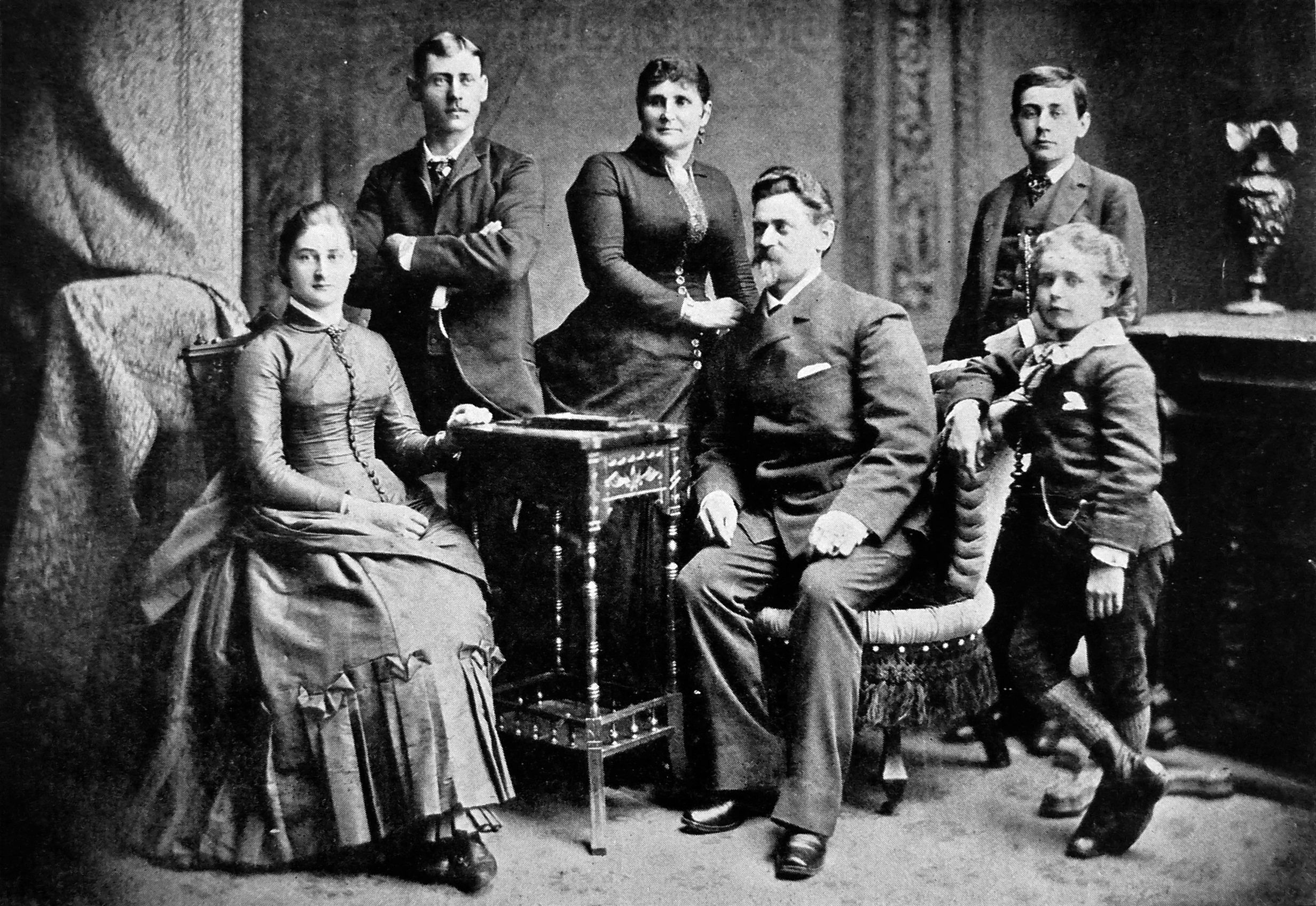
Brosius with his family, 1888

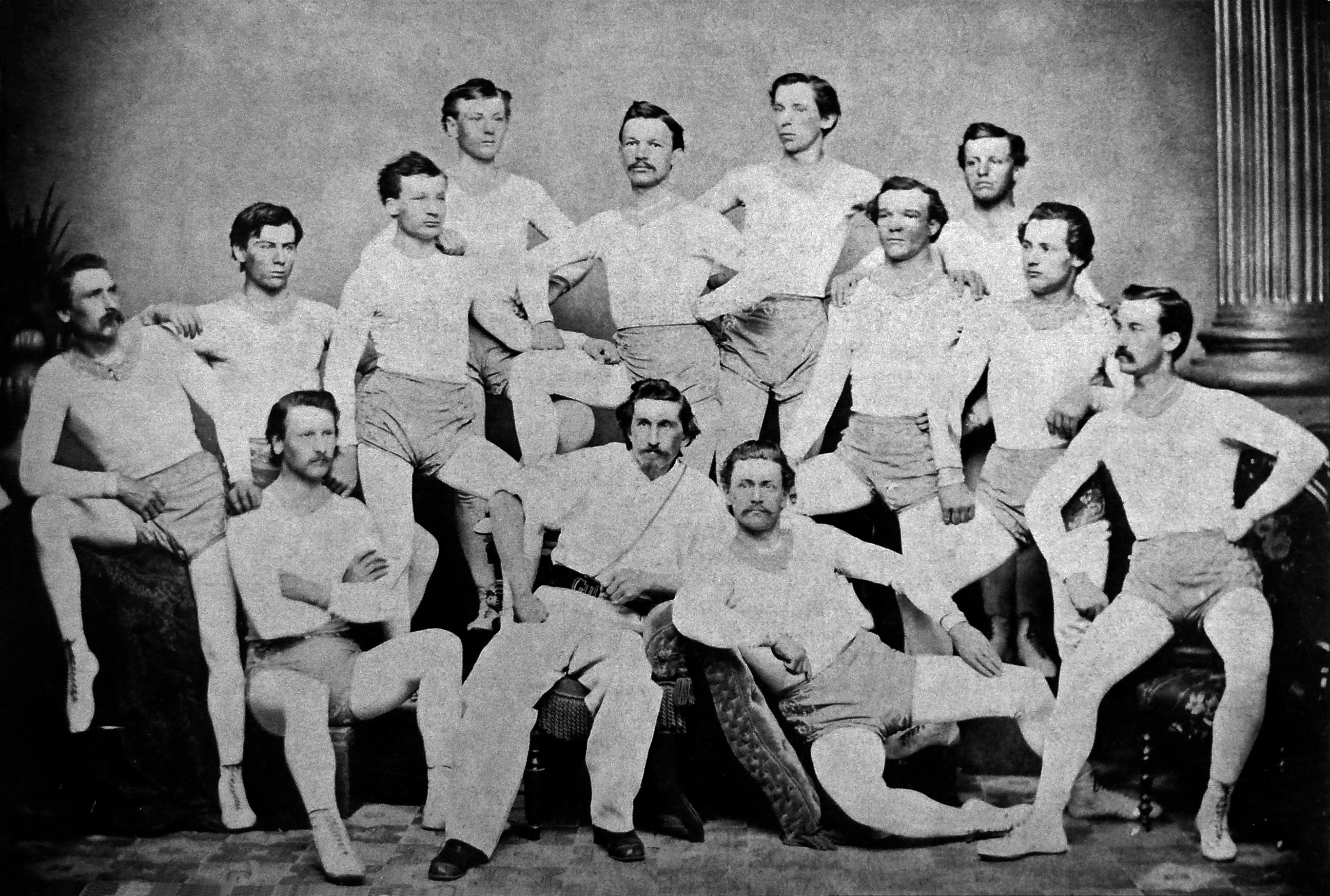
With acrobatic gymnasts of the Milwaukee Turnverein, 1866

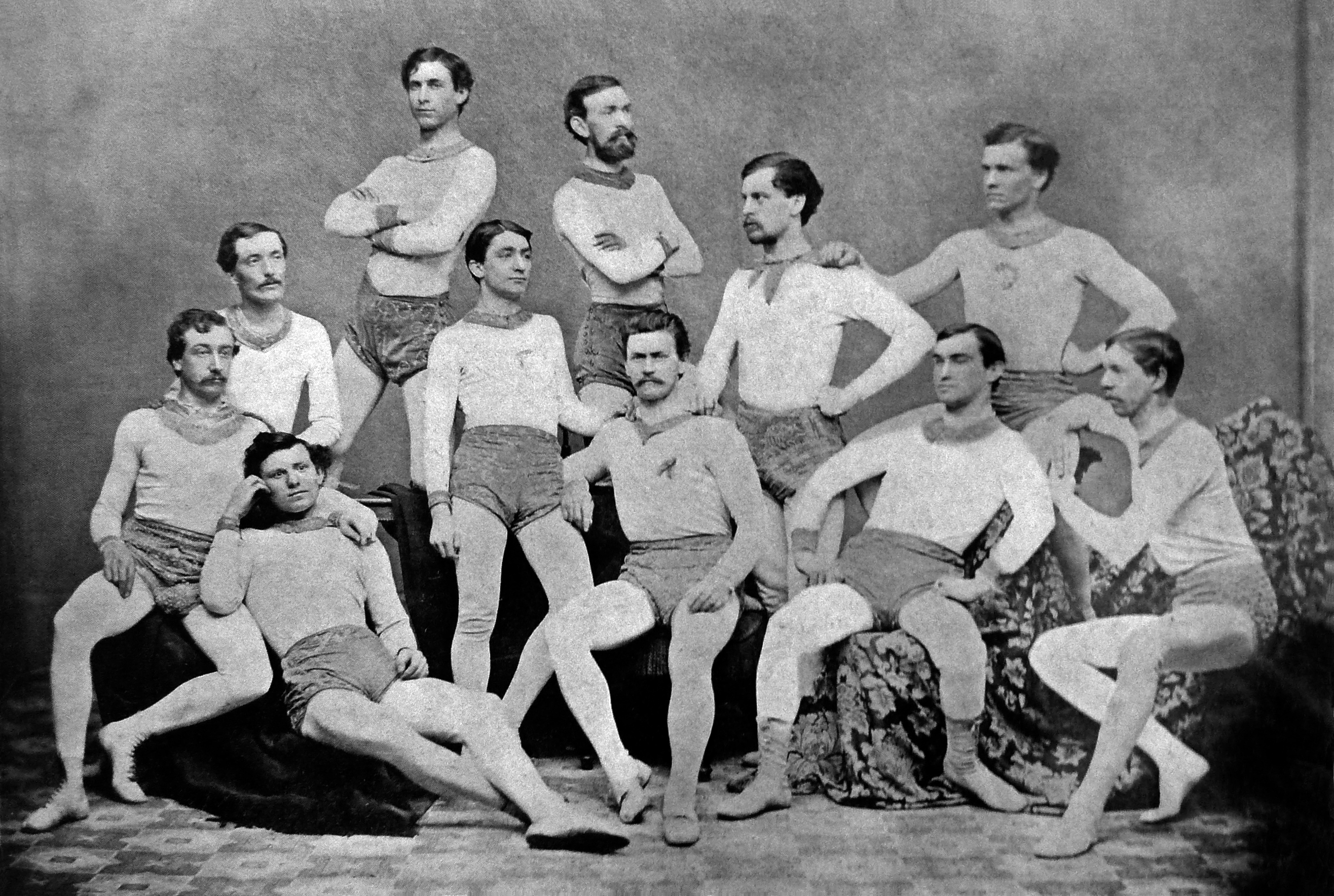
With the first team of the Milwaukee gymnasium, 1869

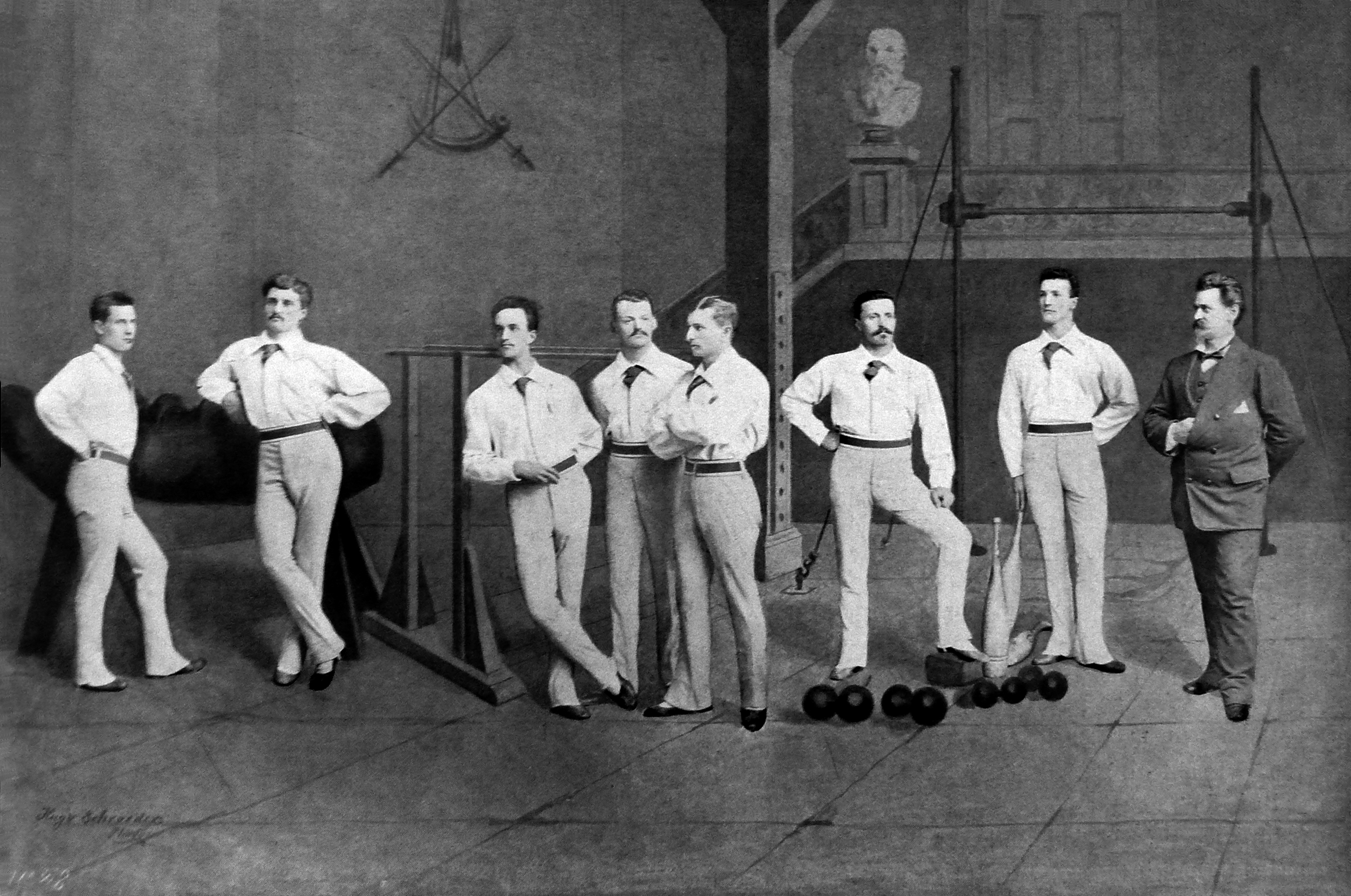
With prize-winning Milwaukee gymnasts, 1880

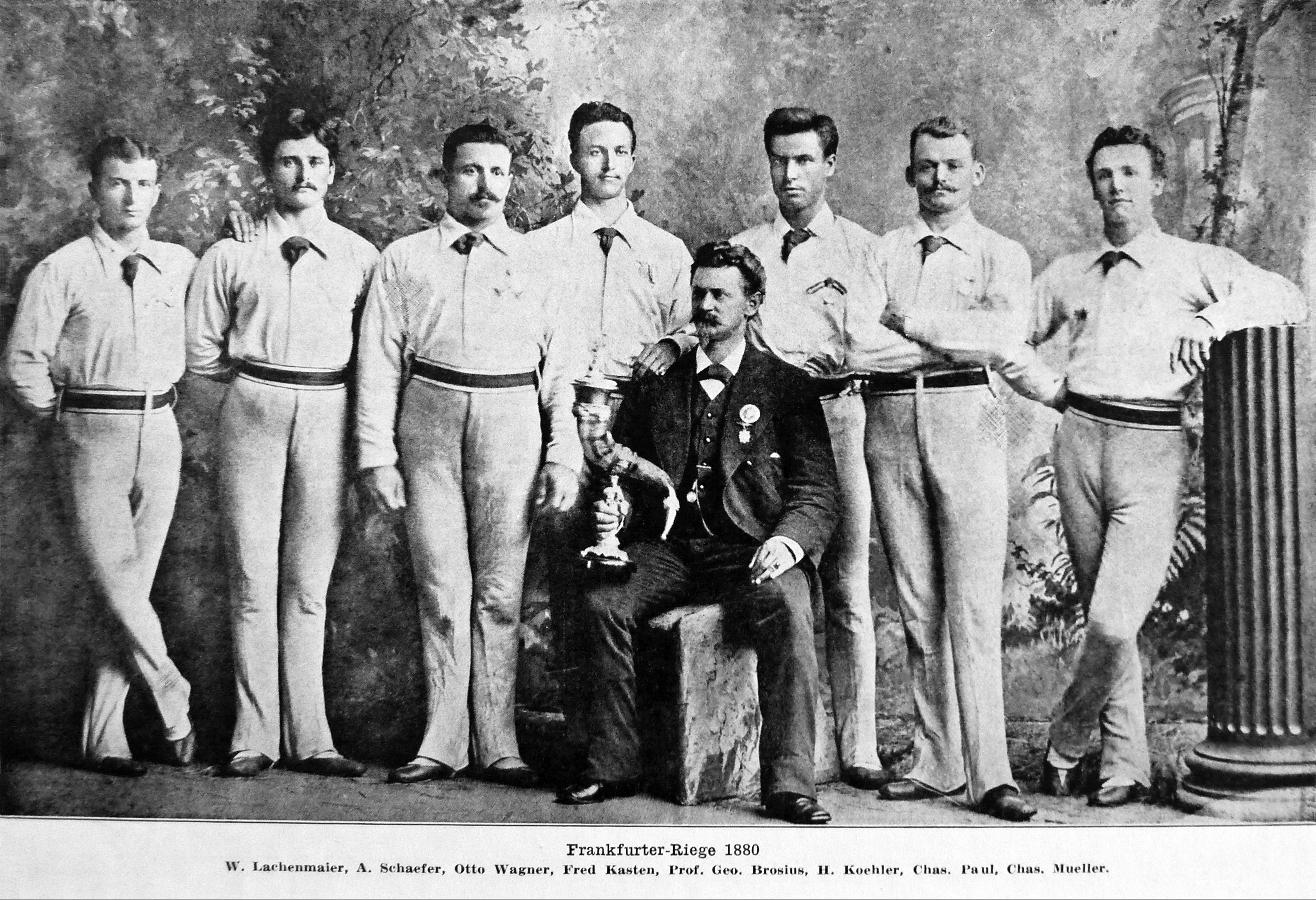
The Milwaukee team that won 5 medals at Germany's Fifth National Turnfest, 1880

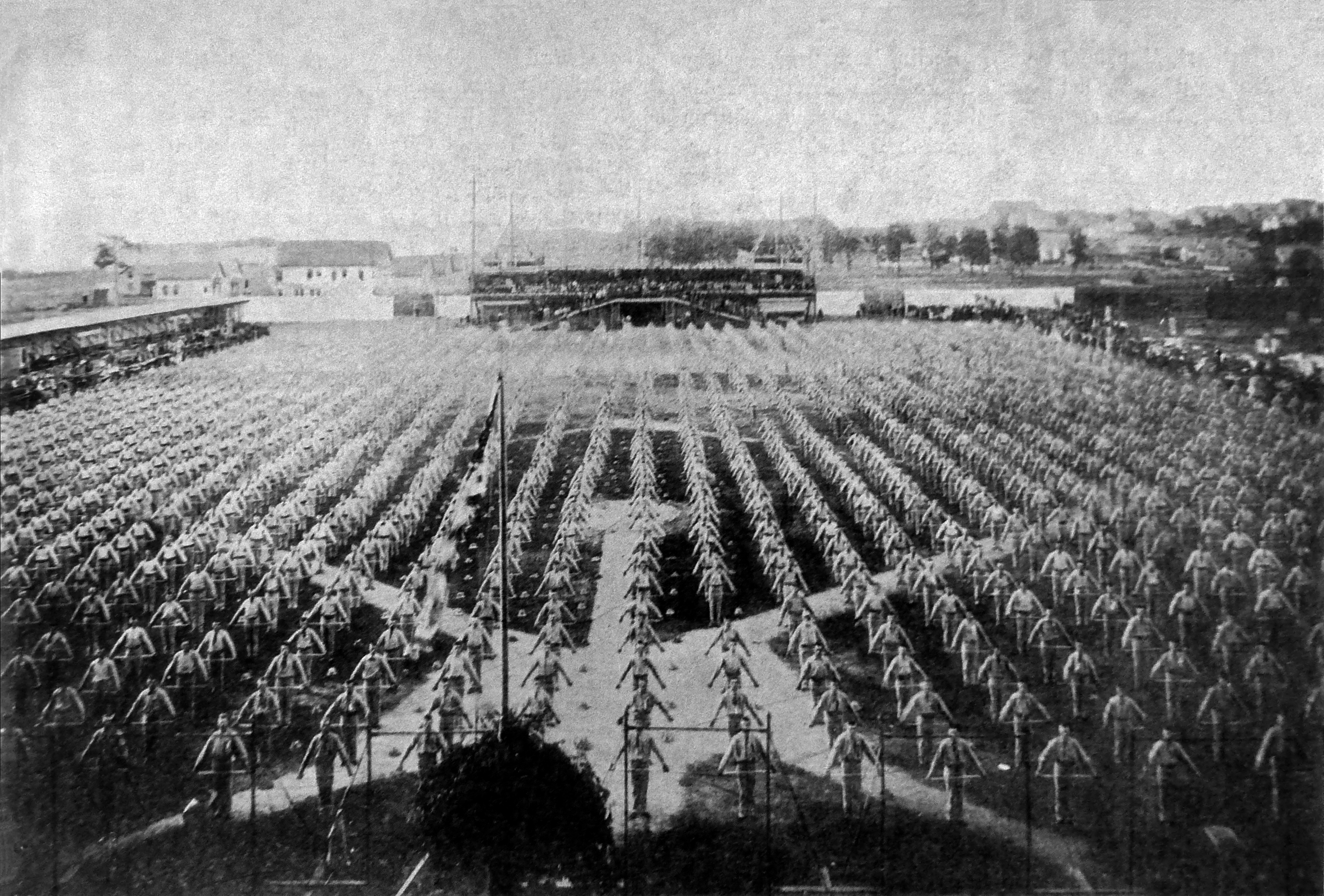
3,000 gymnasts directed by Brosius, 1893

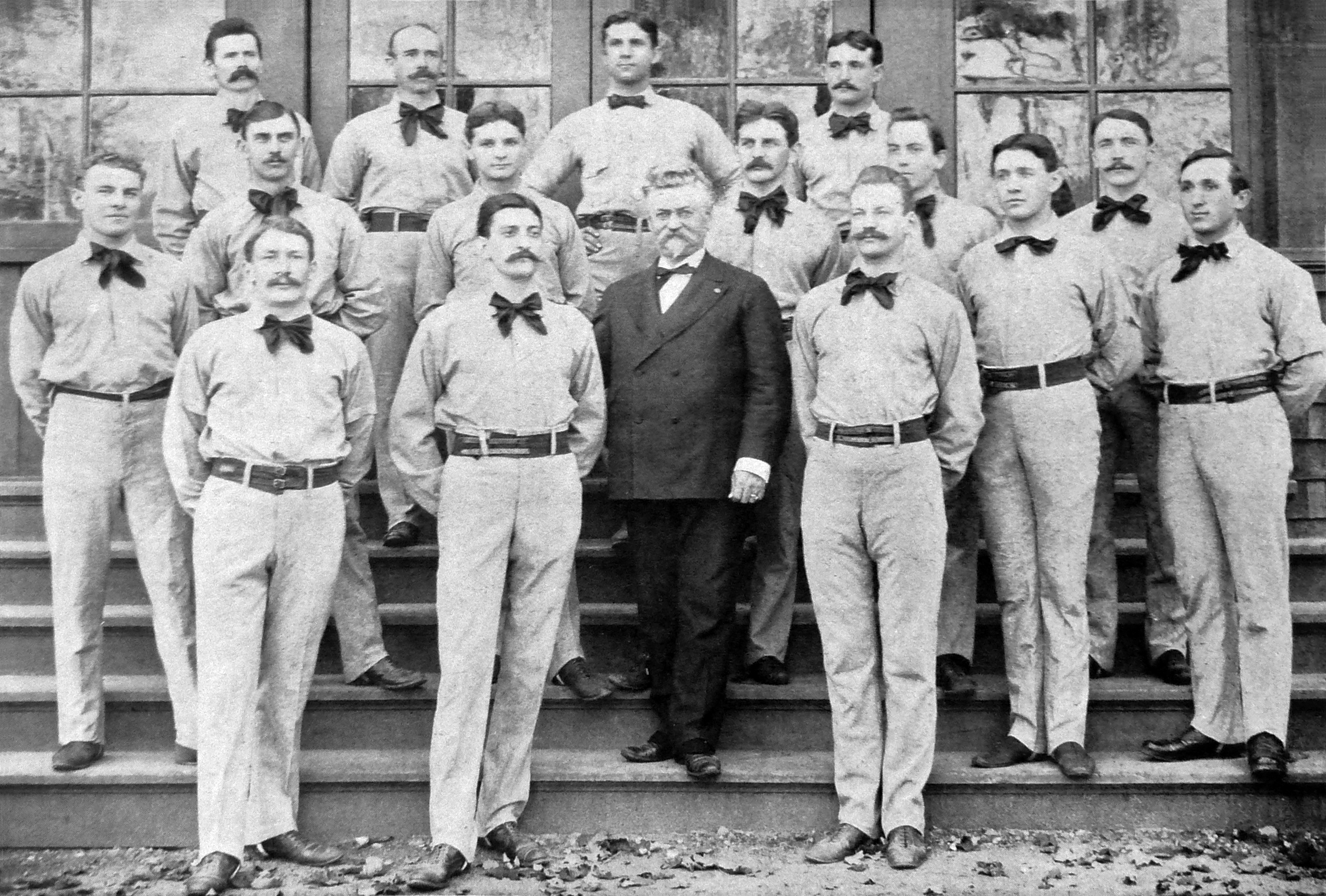
With Milwaukee gymnasts, 1900

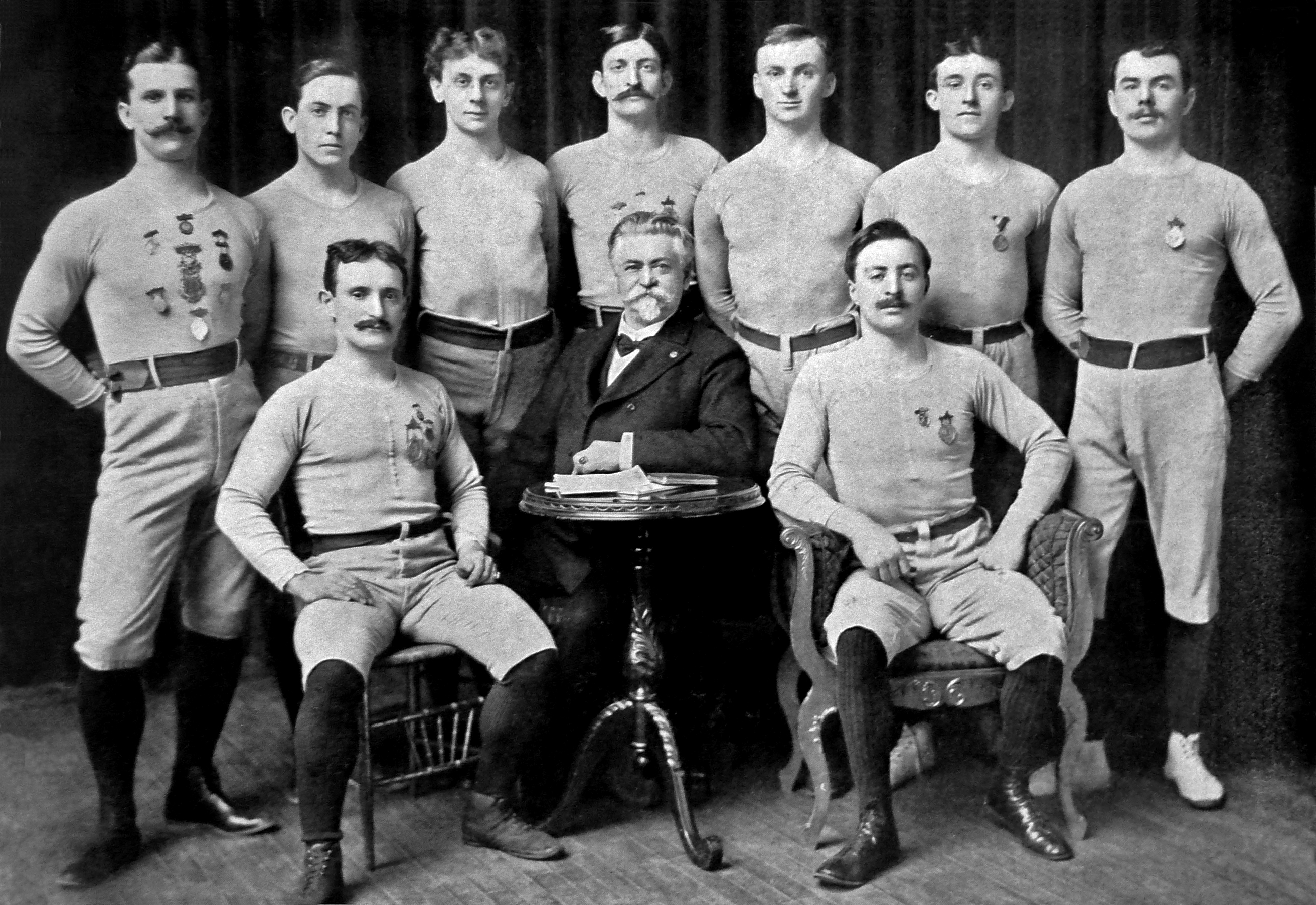
With Milwaukee gymnasts, 1905

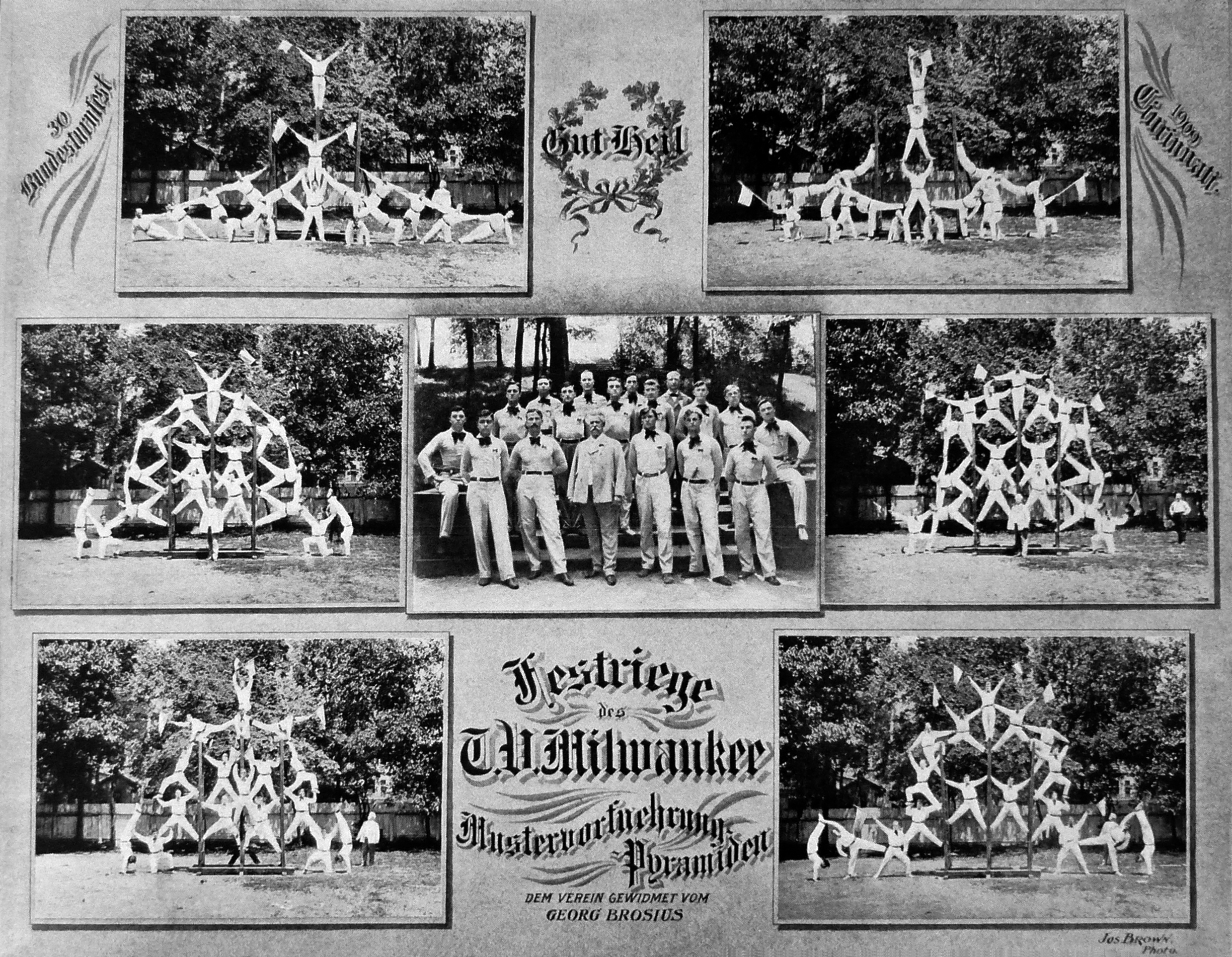
With Milwaukee gymnasts, 1909

== Publications ==
- Brosius, George. Fifty Years Devoted to the Cause of Physical Culture, 1864-1914 (Milwaukee: Germania Publishing, 1914).

== See also ==
- Turners
